= Såningskvinnan =

Statue in central Gothenburg, Sweden

Coordinates: 57°42′24.33″N 11°58′6.87″E

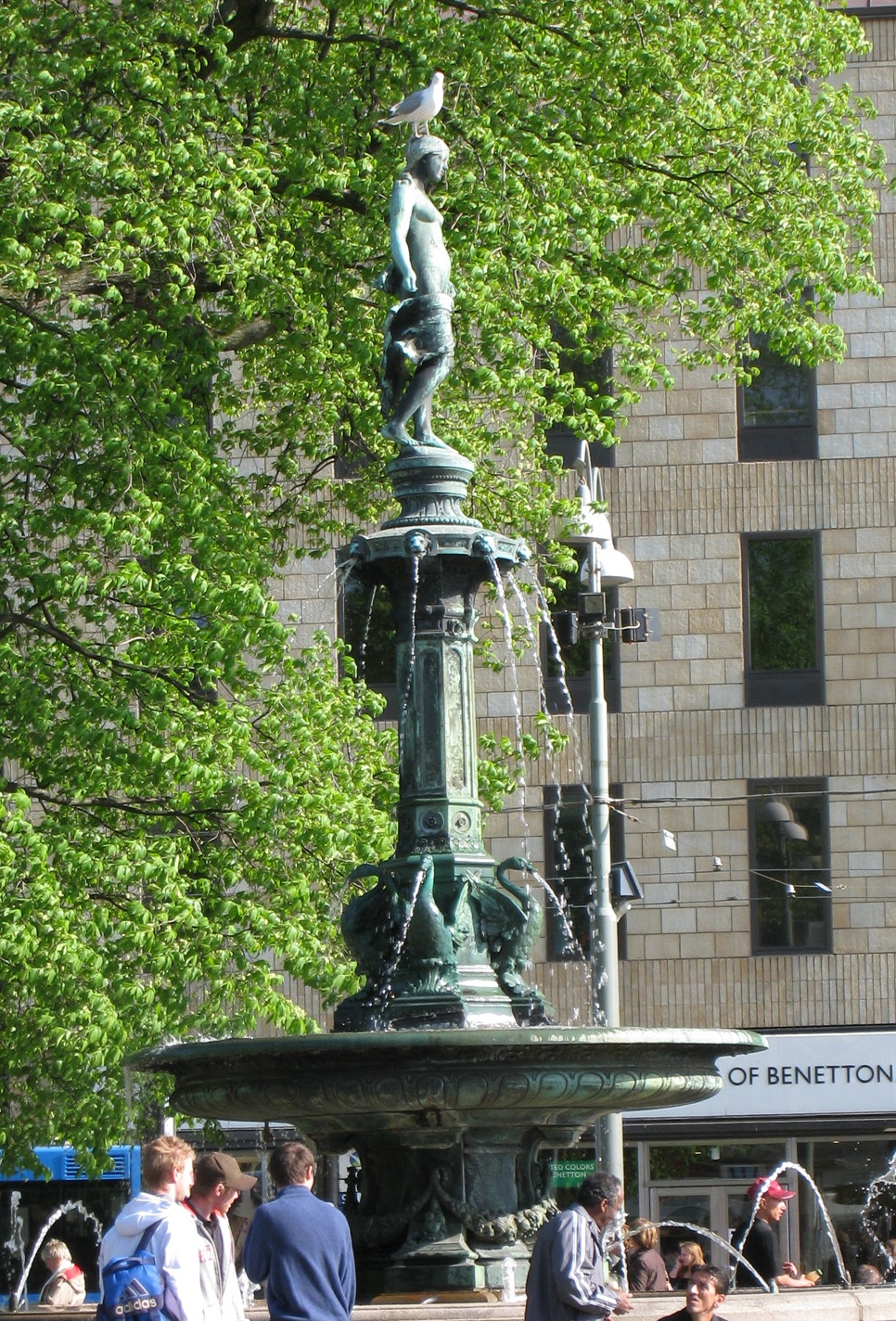
Johanna i Brunnsparken, 2008.

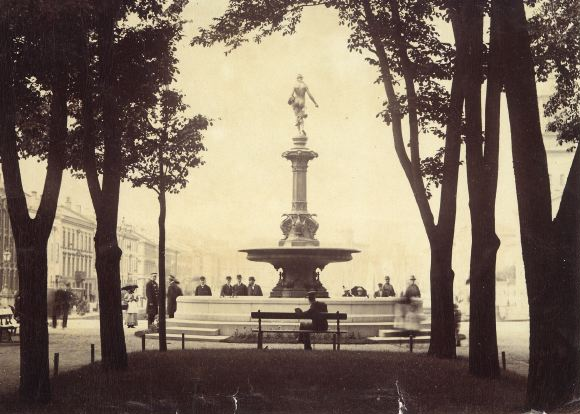
Såningskvinnan in Gothenburg, around 1900.

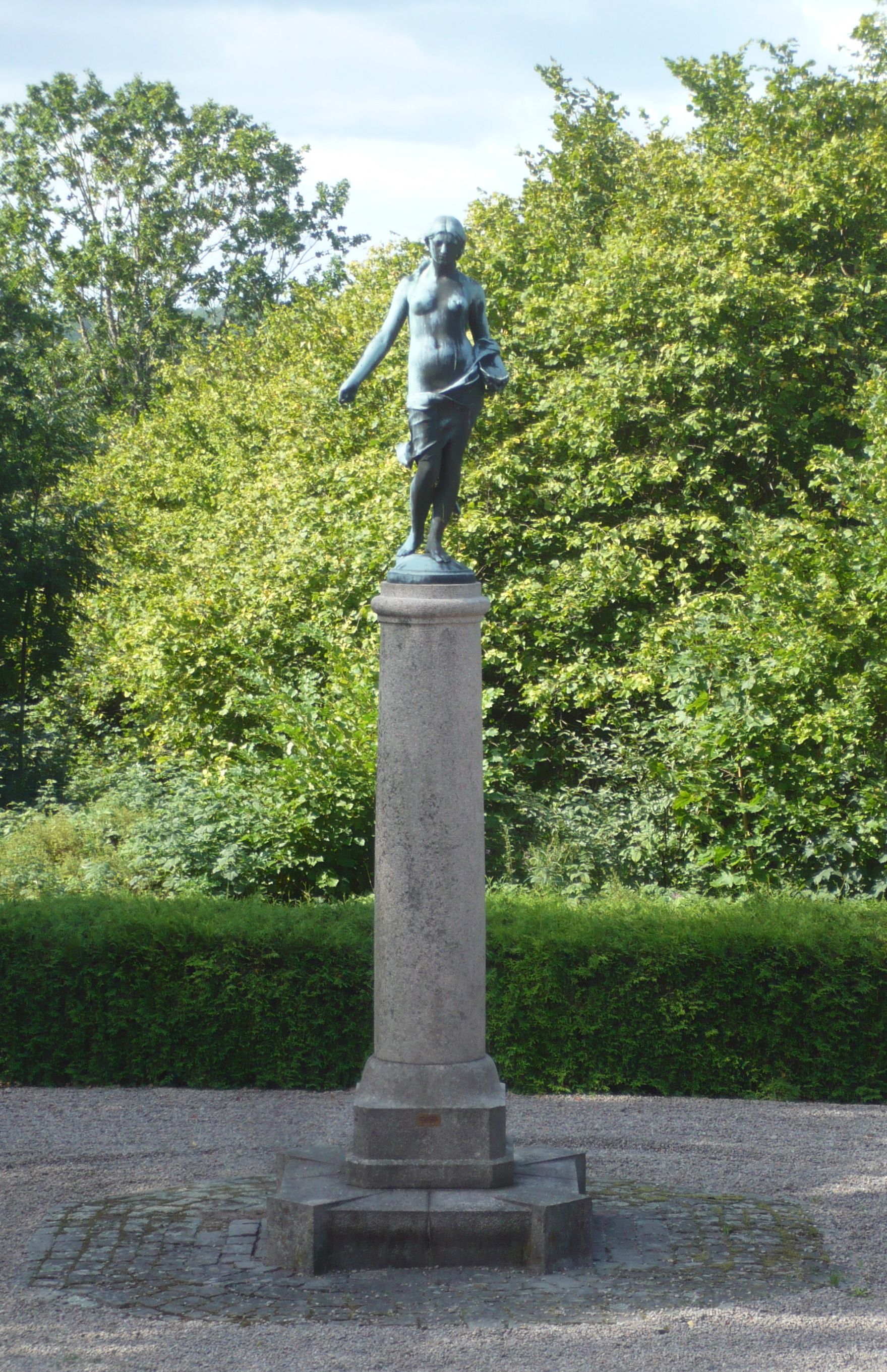
Såningskvinnan at the Folk institute of Bräkne-Hoby.

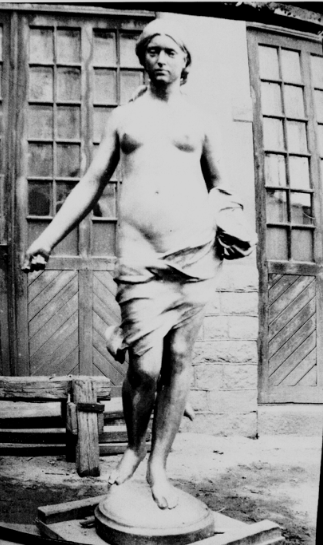
Såningskvinnan, 1919, at the Meyer foundry in Stockholm.

Såningskvinnan (French: La Semeuse, lit. 'the sowing woman'), popularly known as Johanna i Brunnsparken (lit. 'Johanna in Brunnsparken'), is a statue of a standing woman in Gothenburg, Sweden, sculpted by Per Hasselberg in 1883. The original gypsum version of the statue remains at the Medicinal history museum of Gothenburg. Såningskvinnan is thought of as the second oldest statue in Gothenburg and its first female statue.

== History ==
Rittmeister Carl Krook in Helsingborg made a donation of 10 thousand Swedish krona in 1878 to the city of Gothenburg for the purpose that Jonas Reinhold Kjellberg and Carl Kjellberg wanted. They wanted the money to go to build a fountain at Brunnsparken. But as the money was not enough for the artefact they wanted to erect, John West Wilson and Pontus Fürstenberg offered to add the missing amount needed to erect a fountain in accordance to the model made by sculptor Per Hasselberg. The model had received a prize by the society Gnistan named in a contest.

The sculpture is 7.5 metres tall, and consists of a basin, shell, column, and the statue proper. The basin is made of granite, the other parts of bronze. A decorated shell rises out of the basin, with a general diameter of four metres. An octagonal column three metres tall rises out of the shell. Four swans are positioned onto the column's base, and at the column's top are eight lion heads, which function as water emitters. On top of the column stands the statue proper at 1.75 metres tall, a sowing woman with "noble, fully featured forms and a mild, Nordic outfit, functioning as an authentic artistic creation". The statue is naked except for a cloth draped on her waist, partly flowing in the wind. The woman is sowing seeds from her right hand, which she is taking out of a basket with her left. Underneath her feet the water flows up, down and sideways, and the architecture brings the parts into a whole. The artefact cost about 40 thousand krona. The two candelabrae on the side were also made by Hasselberg.

Såningskvinnan and the fountain basin were cast in bronze by Gruet Jeunes in Paris, France and placed in Brunnsparken, Gothenburg. The statue was unveiled on the nameday of Johanna on 21 July 1883, with Oscar Ekman and the Göta Artillery Regiment present at the event.

The statue is popularly called Johanna i Brunnsparken, which probably comes from the day it was unveiled, alternatively from Johanna Ekstein, a dancer at the Stora Teatern, who is said to have served as the model for the sculptor Hasselberg.

Carl Larsson depicted the statue in the painting Interiör från Fürstenbergska galleriet (Interior from the Fürstenberg gallery, 1887)

The statue was taken down in autumn 2015. It was reinstated on 10 March 2016 after a total renovation of the fountain basin and the column. The statue had been cleaned, waxed and partly reconstructed.

== Selected versions ==
- Original in gypsum 1883, at the Museum of medicinal history in Gothenburg.
- Cast in bronze 1882–1883 by Gruet Jeune, Paris (Brunnsparken, Gothenburg – "Johanna").
- Cast in bronze 1919 at Otto Meyer's foundry (Folk institute of Blekinge County in Bräkne-Hoby). A gift to the institute by council member Lindvall, Havgården in Nättraby.
- 143 statuettes of parian ware named Såerskan by Gustavsberg porcelain.

== Sources ==
- Carenberg Carl-Olov, ed. (2005). Pariantillverkning vid Gustavsberg: 1861–1977. Motala. p. 44. LIBRIS 12079406
- Cederblad, Albert (1884). Göteborg : skisserade skildringar af Sveriges andra stad i våra dagar jämte en återblick på dess minnen ... Göteborg: D. F. Bonnier. p. 27f. LIBRIS 1596176
- Dahlbäck Lutteman Helena, ed. (1975). Gustavsberg 150 år: [utställningskatalog]. Nationalmusei utställningskatalog, 0585-3222; 389. Stockholm: Nationalmuseum. p. 23. LIBRIS 7602119. ISBN 91-7100-069-0
- Annika Gunnarsson, ed. (2010). Per Hasselberg. Waldemarsudde exhibition catalogue 0282-0323; 95:10. Malmö: Arena/Åmells Artbooks. p. 20, 40, 64, 103–104, 114, 124. LIBRIS 11659598. ISBN 978-91-7843-325-4
- Torell, Ulf (2007). Per Hasselberg: den nakna sensualismens skulptör. Ronneby: Ronneby hembygdsförening. p. 47-59, 60–76, 107, 108, 303, 334. LIBRIS 10643114. ISBN 9789197509237
- Öhnander, Bengt A (2004). Statyer berättar: [76 konstverk i Göteborg]. Göteborg: Tre böcker. p. 24-26. LIBRIS 9600298. ISBN 91-7029-565-4
