= Brunnsparken =

Brunnsparken (Swedish for "well park") refers to multiple places:

- Brunnsparken, a public square in central Gothenburg, Sweden
- Brunnsparken, the Swedish name for Kaivopuisto in southern Helsinki, Finland
- Brunnsparken, a public park in the district of Adolfsberg in Örebro, Sweden.
