= Brunnsparken, Gothenburg =

Central square in Gothenburg, Sweden

Coordinates: 57°42′24.75″N 11°58′8.41″E

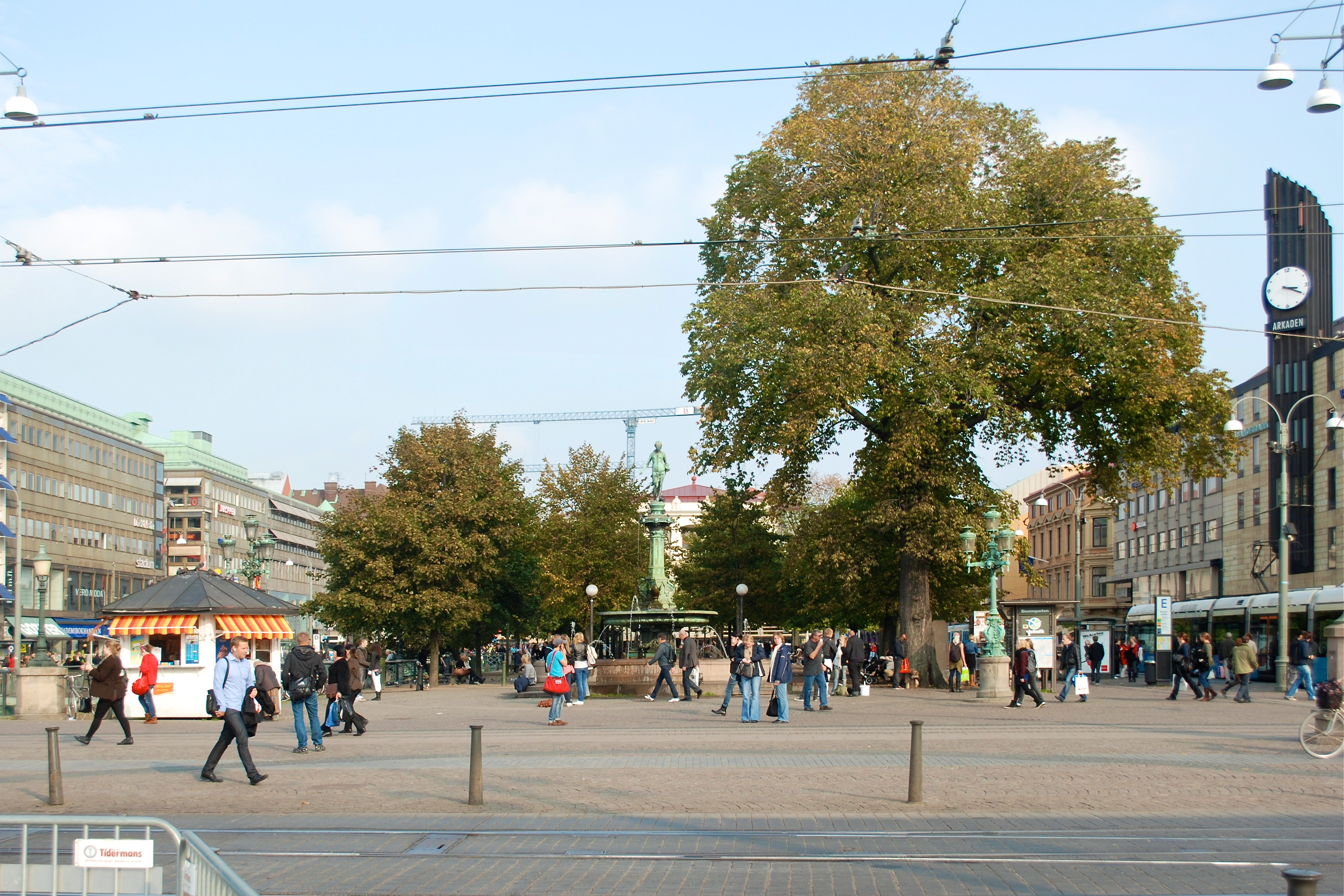
Brunnsparken seen from the west.

Brunnsparken (Swedish for "well park") is a central square in Gothenburg, Sweden. It is located between Nordstan and Arkaden, and between two of Gothenburg's oldest streets, Norra Hamngatan and Södra Hamngatan (actually bordering Stora Hamnkanalen to the north). With its central location "Inom Vallgraven" and with numerous shopping centres it is a popular meeting place in Gothenburg.

== Traffic hub ==
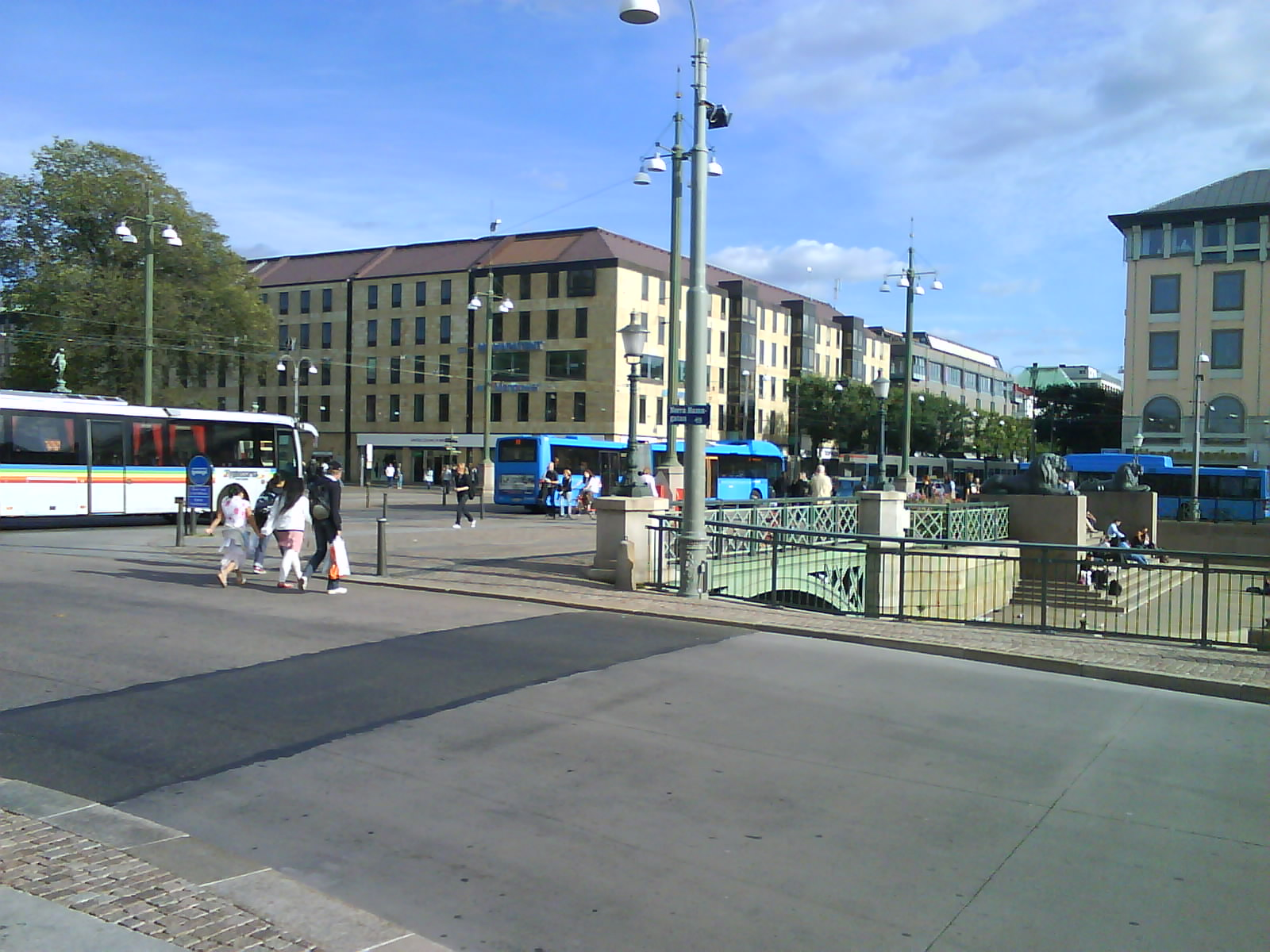
Brunnsparken has frequent bus and tram traffic.

Brunnsparken is dominated by tram stops, surrounding the square from three directions. Together with Drottningstorget right to the east, Brunnsparken functions as an important hub for the tram network, with almost every line passing through it. Together with the Gothenburg Central Station and the Nils Ericson Terminal, it forms the centre of all public transport in Gothenburg.

Brunnsparken is one of the most frequently trafficked hubs in all of Sweden, with about 120 trams and 130 buses leaving per hour in rush hour traffic, which comes to about 4 trams or buses leaving per minute, from 10 stops.

== History ==
=== Etymology ===
In 1822, trees were planted on an island in Stora Hamnkanalen, and in 1834, the owner of the Kronan pharmacy, Hans Jacob Cavallin, founded a well house made of stone on the site, and this gave the square its current name.

This health well was frequently visited from 1834 to 1858, and one of the visitors was Esaias Tegnér who drank from the well in 1837. In 1858 the service was discontinued, but a wing from the well house was put to use as a warm bath house, up to 1879 when the buildings were torn down. On 23 July 1867, behind the bath house was opened "a little shop, which shall become a quite comfortable and frequently visited refuge in the days when the summer sun shines its golden rays from the cloud-free sky over passers-by. In this shop there shall be carbonated water, lemonade and other refreshments available to the public at prices lower than the usual". The building was designed by city architect Hansson, built by the Bark & Warburgs factory and painted by L. Rubenson "with the taste that always distinguishes his work". The first owner of "this comfortable installation" was J. G. Leufvenmark.

The first documented use of the name Brunnsparken was in Göteborgs och Bohusläns calender för året 1847, but the square only received its official name in 1863 when the plantations were improved.

== Surroundings ==
Originally, what is now Brunnsparken was an island in Stora Hamnkanalen with the name Järnvågsplatsen (1753) after the iron weighing scale that had been located there since 1624. Work with these scales started in 1683 and was completed in 1690. The scales were transferred to Järntorget in 1785, and in the great fire in 1813, the rest of the scales burned down in Brunnsparken. Trees were planted on the site of the former scales in 1822, as a "promenade". In 1861, this part of Stora Hamnkanalen was filled in, south of the "island" that now forms Södra Hamngatan.

In 1752, Niclas Jacobsson's sugar refinery (a "Såkerraffinaderiwärk") on Södra Hamngatan was completed, designed by architect Carl Hårleman. The sugar refinery was later owned by Pontus Fürstenberg. It was damaged in the fire on 2 March 1792, but remained in use up to 1841, when it was discontinued. Parts of its foundation remain under the Palacehuset hotel to this day.

In April 1913, an underground pumping station was built near Brunnsparken.

== Johanna i Brunnsparken ==
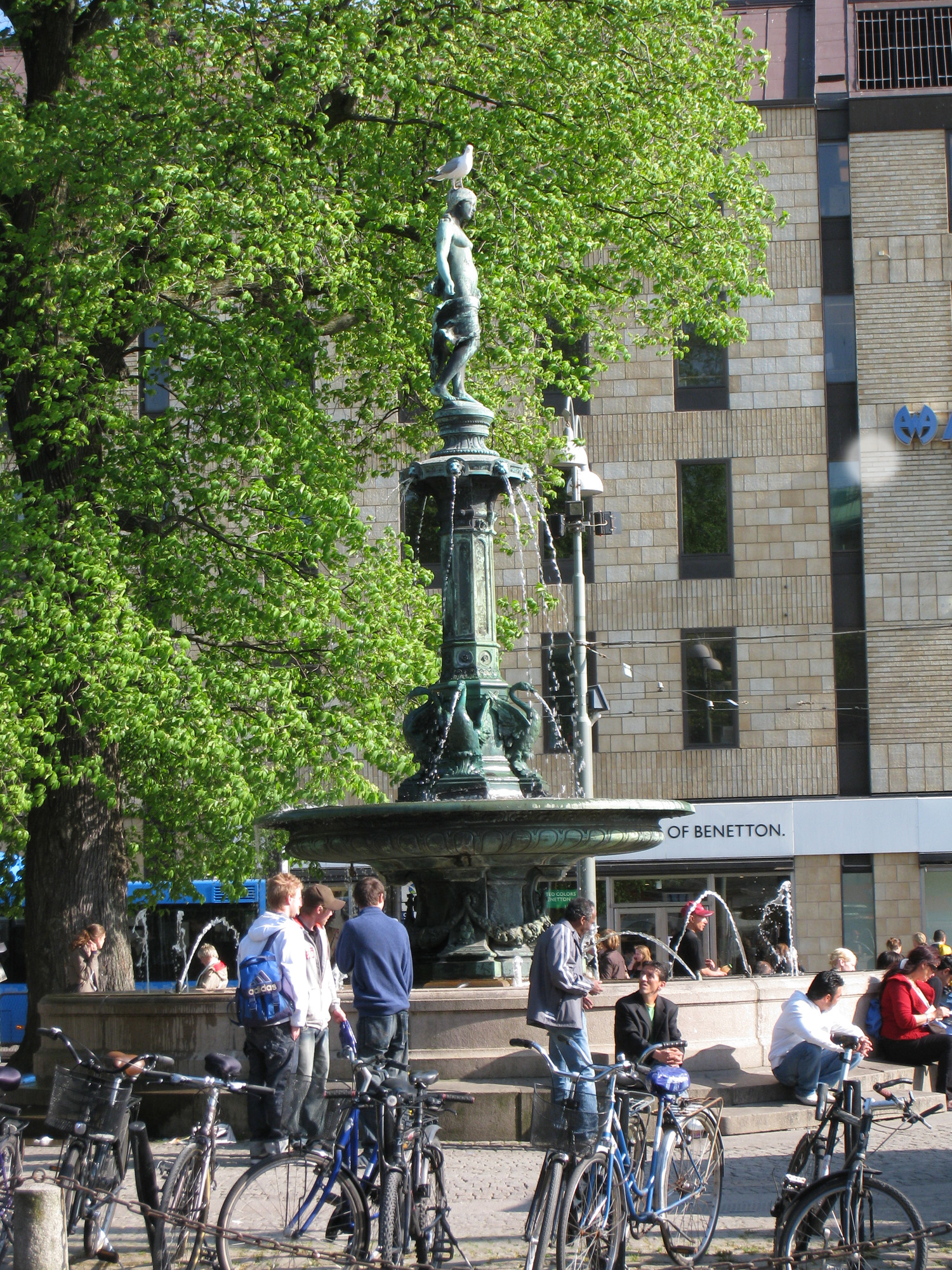
The statue Såningskvinnan ("Johanna i Brunnsparken"), unveiled in 1883.

At the western end of Brunnsparken is a fountain with the statue Såningskvinnan (the sowing woman). The statue was unveiled on the day of Johanna on 21 July 1883, and is therefore popularly called Johanna. The statue was made by Per Hasselberg and cast in bronze by Gruet Jeunes in Paris, France, partially financed by Pontus Fürstenberg, who lived nearby. The gypsum original is located in the Gothenburg Museum of medicinal history.

The administration building for the city railways was located at the site of the statue up until 1820.

In 2015, statue was temporarily removed for maintenance and conservation. An archeological excavation was done at the site and one of the two iron balances that were used in Sweden during the 17th and 18th century was found. The balance in Gothenburg weighed all the iron manufactured in the Värmland part of Bergslagen during the 1800s. The balance was found 2 m (6.6 ft) below the present-day street level.

There are two more statues in Brunnsparken. Two lions made of bronze lie at the staircase at Stora Hamnkanalen. They are made by Camilla Bergman in 1991. Between 1638–1673 there was a wooden bridge at Brunnsparken, having four standing lion statues. This bridge was called the "Lion bridge".

== Brunnsparken in popular culture ==
Brunnsparken is mentioned in the Christmas song Jul, recorded by Snowstorm and Thorleifs among others, with the lyrics depicting someone being lonely here during Christmastime. Brunnsparken is also mentioned in the song Alla vägar bär till götet. The rock and roll band Motvinds's song Göteborg (1977) mentions "fyllona i Brunnsparken". Kai Martin and Stick! have made a song called "Johanna i Brunnsparken".
