= Jul (song) =

1983 Swedish Christmas song by Ralf Peeker

Single by Ralph Peeker
- A-side: "Jul"
- B-side: "Mirabelle"
- Released: 1983
- Genre: Christmas
- Label: Mariann
- Songwriter: Ralf Peeker

Jul is a Christmas song written by Ralf Peeker from the band Snowstorm and recorded by him and released as a single in 1983 with "Mirabelle" as B-side.

== Background ==
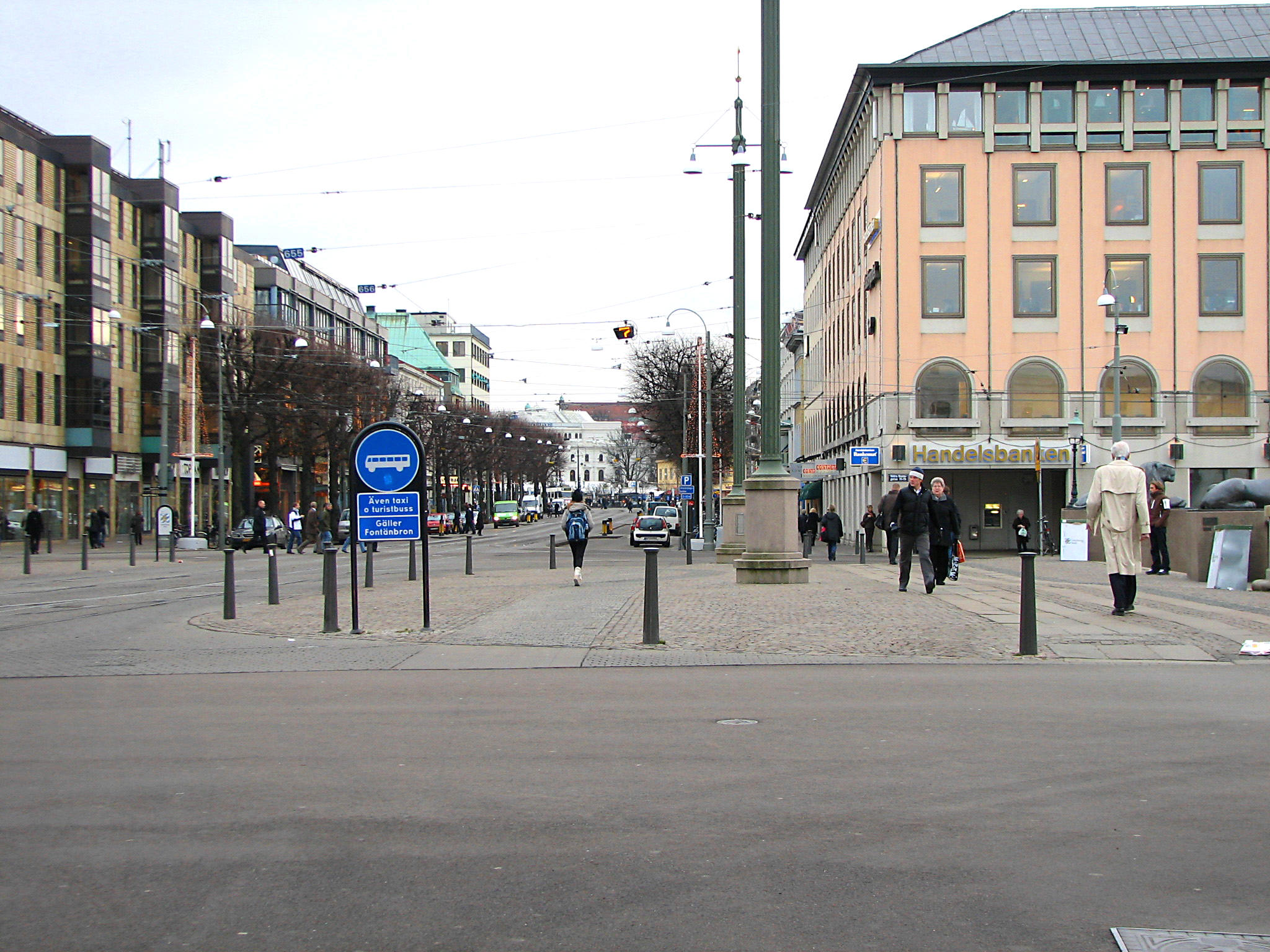
Brunnsparken, Gothenburg

The song describes Christmas time from the perspective of homeless people in Brunnsparken, Gothenburg, and is also known from the chorus opening lines "men det är någon i Brunnsparken som gråter".

The song lyrics also includes references to the poem "Tomten" by Viktor Rydberg, and the TV programme Kalle Anka och hans vänner önskar God Jul.

== Thorleifs version ==
"Jul"

Single by Thorleifs
- A-side: "Jul"
- B-side: "A Morning at Cornwall"
- Released: 1989
- Genre: Christmas
- Label: Doreme
- Songwriter: Ralf Peeker

In 1989, the song was recorded by Thorleifs, and released as a single with "A Morning at Cornwall" as B-side on the record label Doreme.
