= Pontus Fürstenberg =

Swedish art collector and merchant

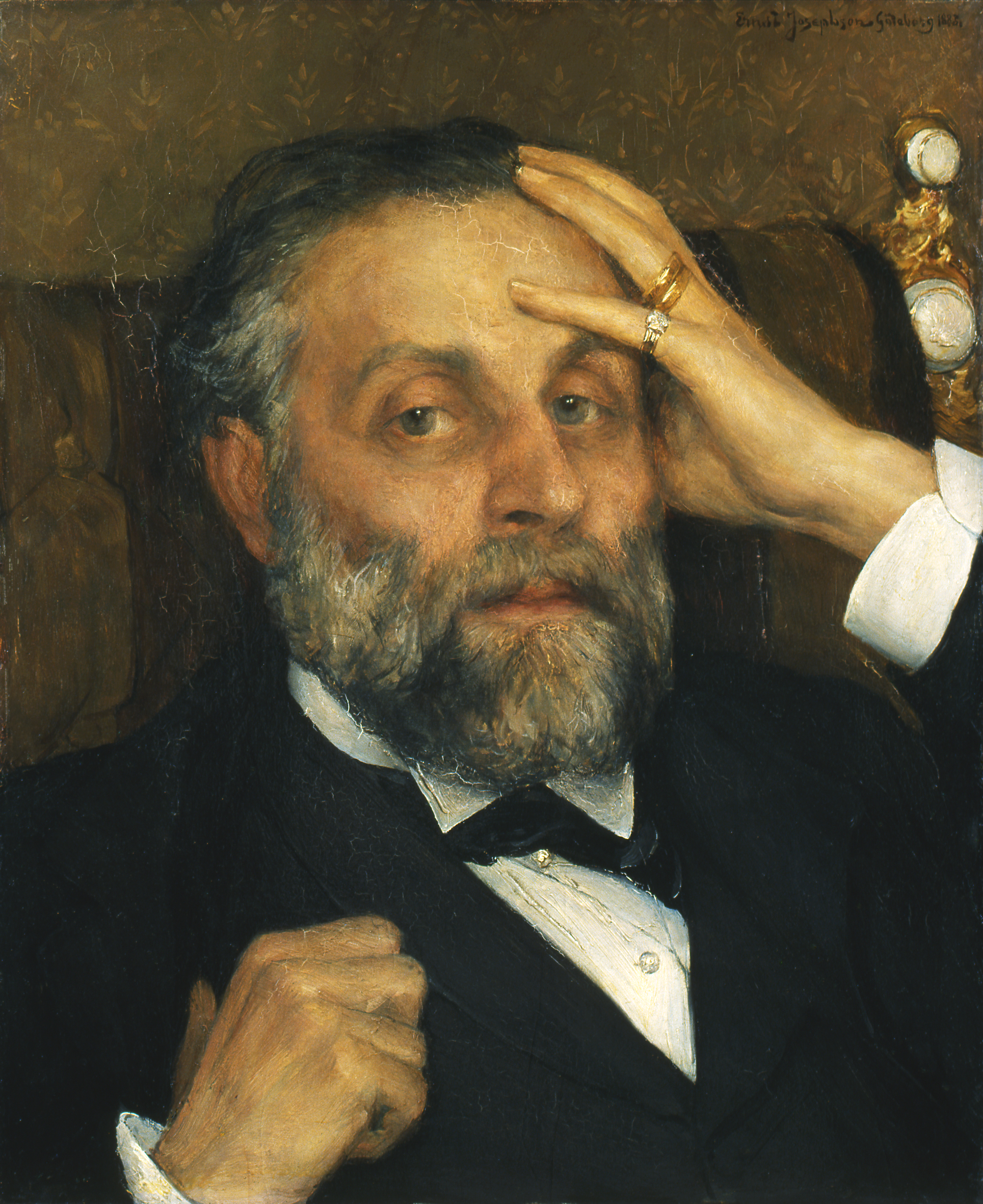
Portrait of Fürstenberg by Ernst Josephson

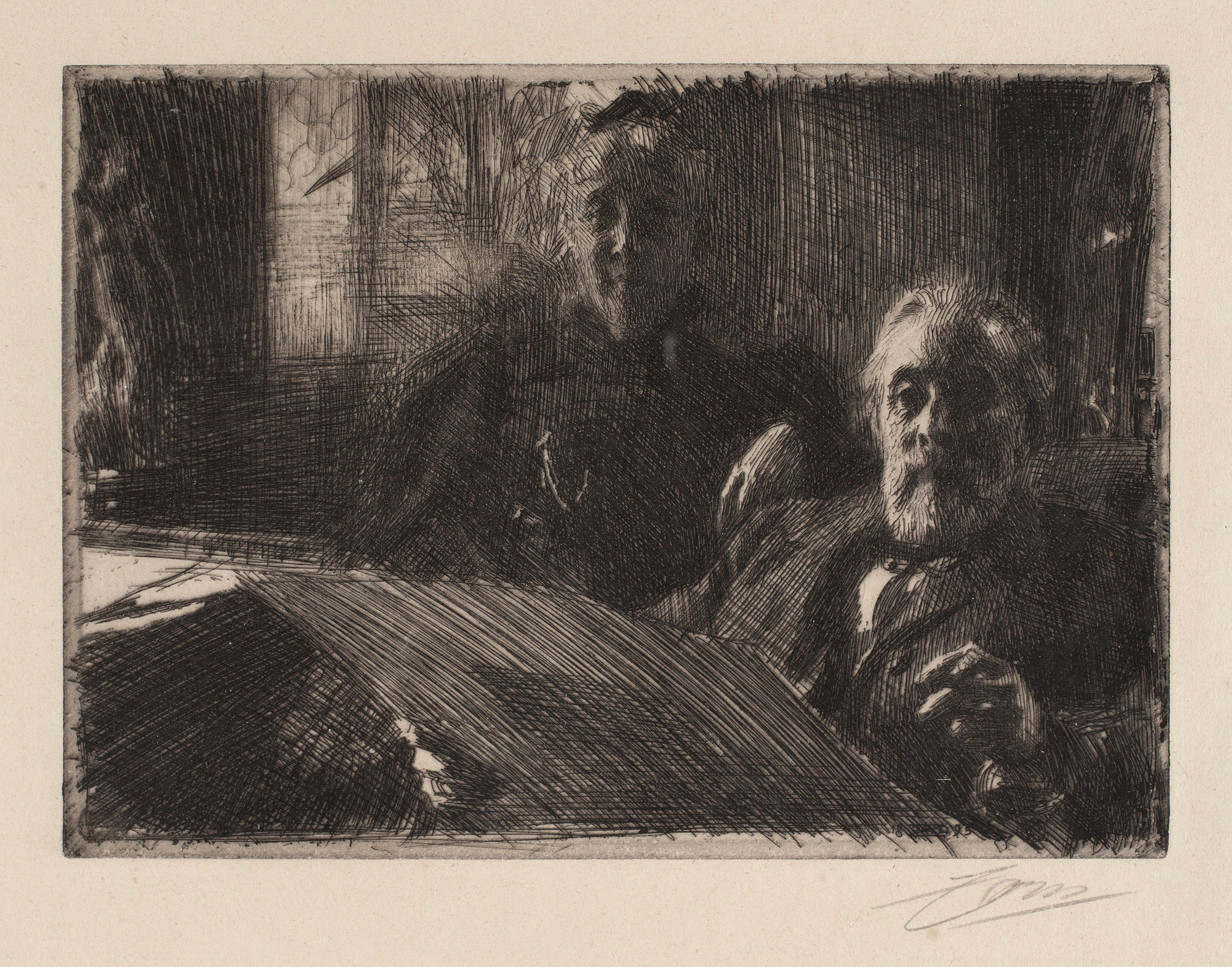
Etching of Anders Zorn featuring Pontus and Göthilda Fürstenberg

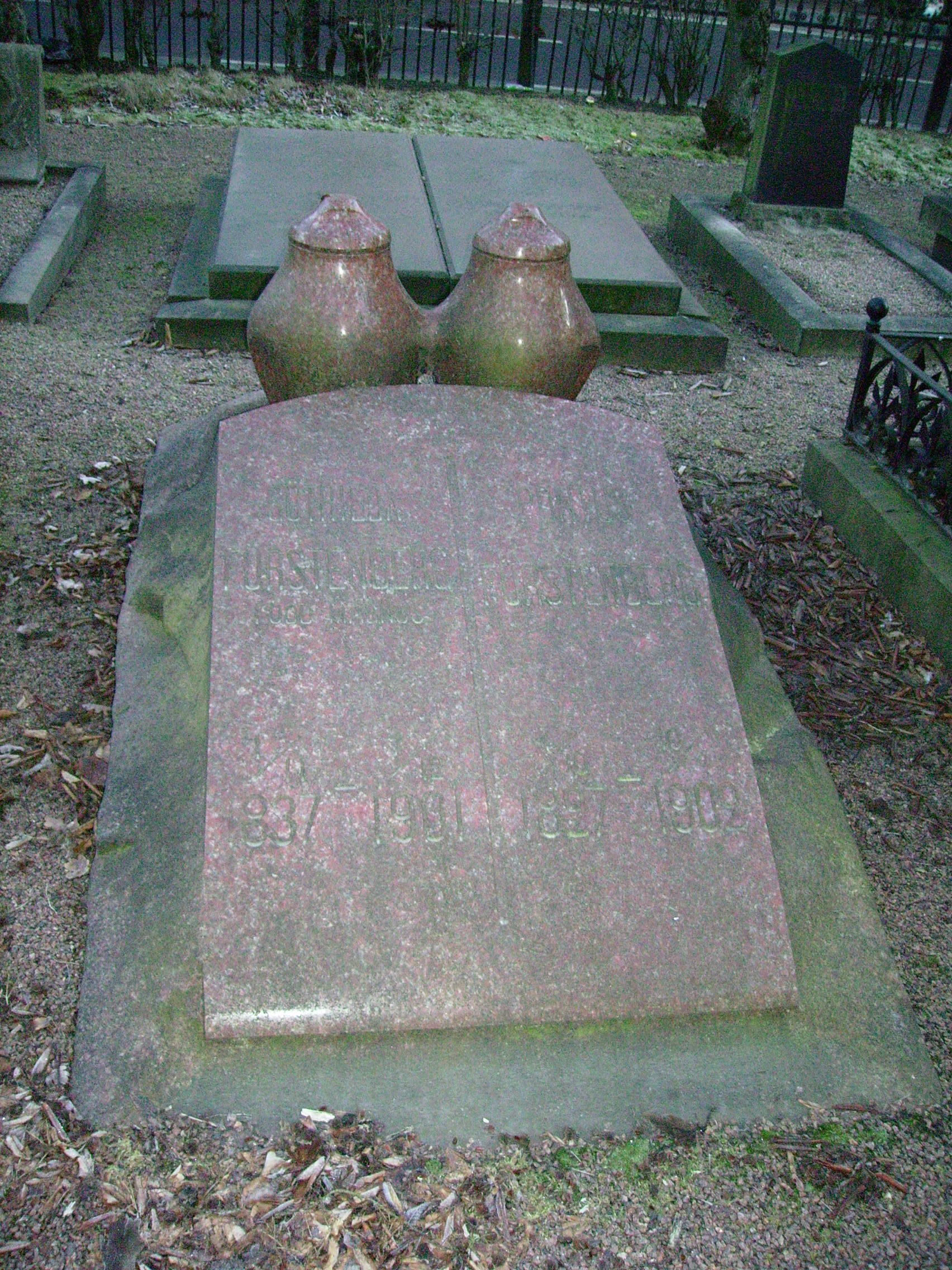
Pontus and Göthilda Fürstenbergs' graves in Gothenburg

Pontus Fürstenberg (4 October 1827 – 10 April 1902) was a Swedish art collector and merchant. He was married to Göthilda Magnus.

== Background ==
Pontus Fürstenberg was born at Östra Hamngatan 26, in Gothenburg, Sweden. His Jewish family had arrived in Sweden at the beginning of the 19th century. Pontus was the oldest child, and his parents were wholesalers Levy Fürstenberg and Rosa Warburg. Levy also owned the textile company Levy Fürstenberg & Co, which provided the family a good economic base.

Pontus did poorly in school. His grades were mediocre, but he did well enough to be able to attend the Handelsintitutet (Institute of Trade). At the age of 26, he became part-owner in his father's textile company. A short way from the company lived the wealthy Magnus family. Both families spent a lot of time together, and it was here that Pontus met their only daughter, Göthilda Magnus, who would later become his wife.

During this time, Pontus started to engage himself in local politics, and at the age of 42 was appointed leader of the city council (stadsfullmäktige) in 1869. He was also involved with many community activities, including serving as Vice President of the Gothenburg Ancient Monument Society.

== The art collection ==
Around 1860, Pontus started to become interested in art, and he started his career as an art collector and art merchant. This interest would have a major impact on many artists, both in Sweden and abroad, and served as the start of what would become the largest and most prominent art collection in Sweden by the end of the 19th century.

The intensive development started when Fürstenberg married Göthilda Magnus in the Gothenburg Synagogue on 31 May 1880. Pontus had long been in love with her, but they were forbidden to be together by Göthilda's father, the rich banker and financier Edvard Magnus. He considered that his rich daughter should not spend time with a "hunchbacked man ten years older than she," which Pontus was. Magnus also thought that the Fürstenberg wealth was too small. But Pontus and Göthilda met in secret anyway, and when Edvard died in 1879, they were free to marry.

The marriage was a big change in Pontus' life; because he had married one of the richest heiresses in Gothenburg, he became a very rich man. He was able to leave his work as a wholesaler to spend the rest of his life in his greatest interest, the arts. Pontus and Göthilda decorated a beautiful home in Brunnsparken, in the center of Gothenburg, which would later be called the "Fürstenberg Palace". He started an art collection activity in his own house, with several million Swedish crowns as start capital. Thanks to Göthilda's enormous wealth, he could develop this activity with several promised artists.

In the beginning, Pontus knew little about art, only that he found art to be beautiful. He got help from an architect friend before buying the first four paintings in his collection. But as time went by his knowledge of art began to emerge. During the Scandinavian art exhibition in Gothenburg, 1881, Pontus made several connections and had his eye on several young Swedish art geniuses.

== The art merchant ==
Pontus supported artists in many ways, not only with food, room, clothes and art materials, but he also helped them to study abroad in places such as Paris. He also would pay artist's debts for them. For this support Pontus received paintings and other pieces or arts. Without Pontus's direct and indirect patronage, artists like Carl Larsson, Ernst Josephson and Anders Zorn would not have been able to focus exclusively on their art.

== Legacy ==
After his death in 1902, Fürstenberg left his valuable private collection of Scandinavian art from the 1880s and 1890s to the Gothenburg Museum of Art.
