= Gothenburg Tramway =

Tramway network in Gothenburg, Sweden

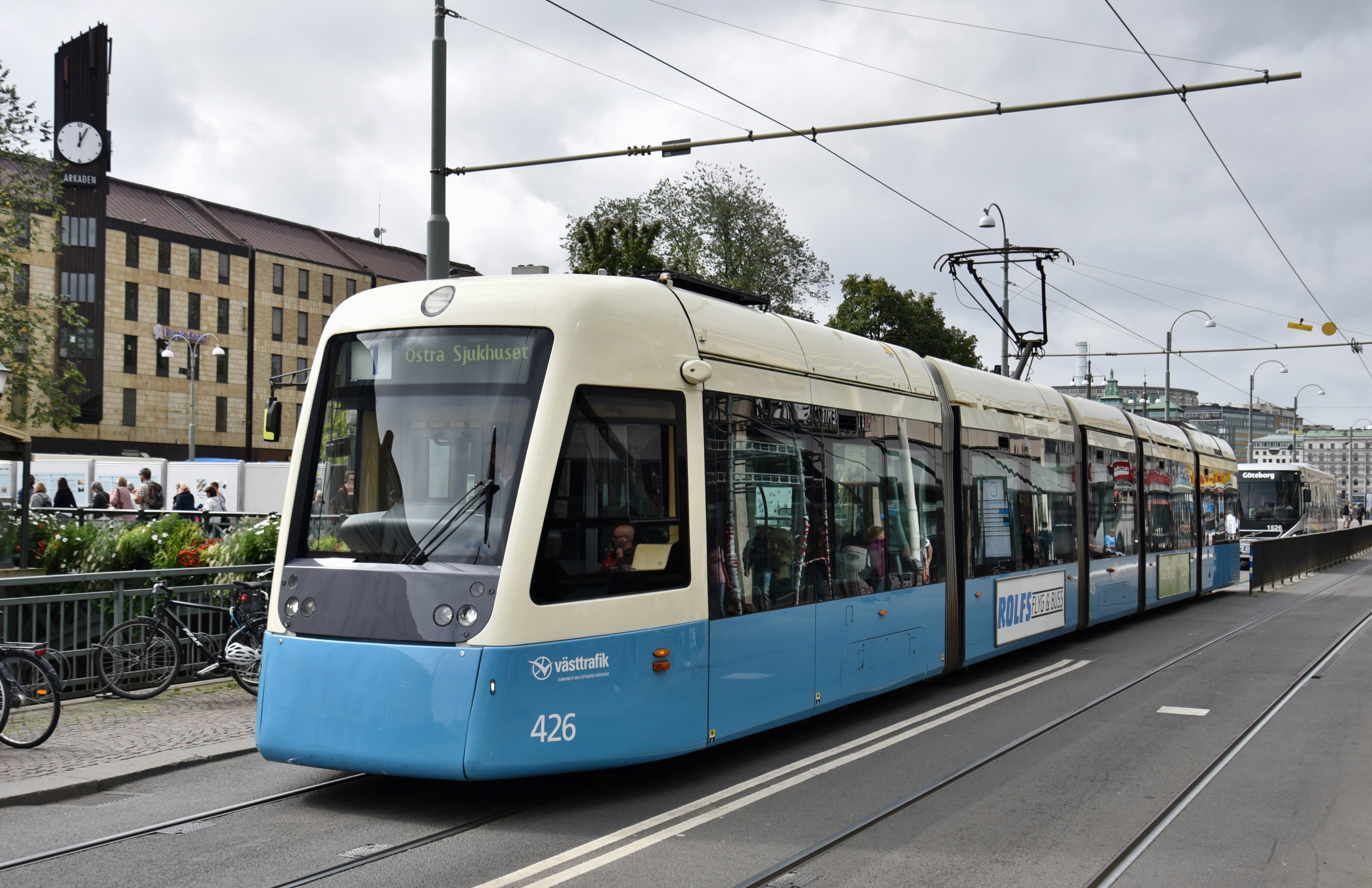
- M32 tram 426 at Brunnsparken

Overview
- Owner: Gothenburg Municipality
- Transit type: Tram transport
- Number of lines: 12 regular
- Number of stops: 132 (list)
- Annual ridership: c. 120 million
- Chief executive: Linda Rudenwall

Operation
- Began operation: 1879; 147 years ago
- Operator: Göteborgs Spårvägar AB
- Character: At-grade urban rail
- Rolling stock: 293 tramcars (list)

Technical
- System length: 176 km (109 mi)
- Track gauge: 1,435 mm (4 ft 8 1/2 in)
- Electrification: 750 V DC overhead line
- Top speed: 60 km/h (37 mph)

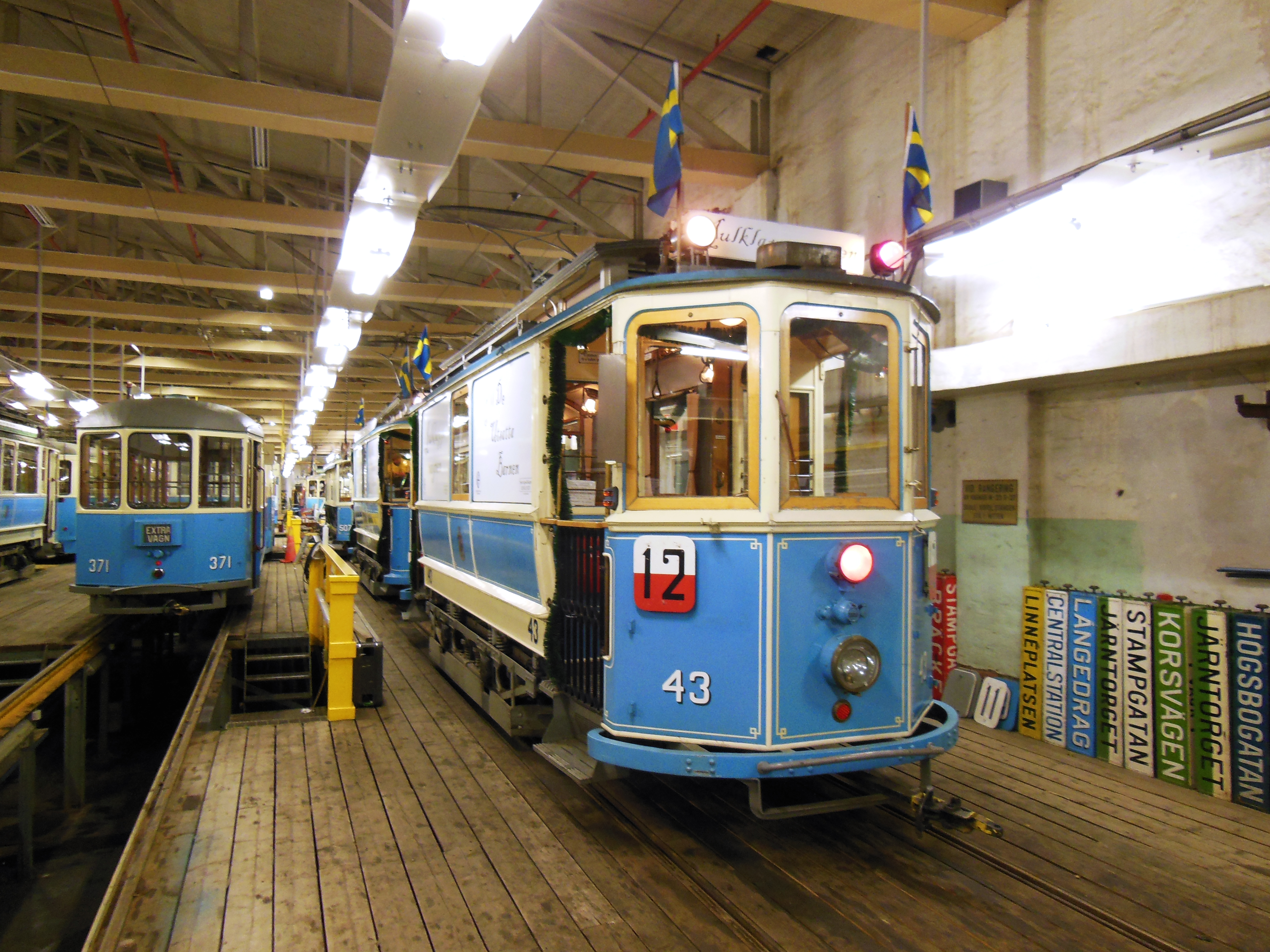
Interior of the Gothenburg tram museum.

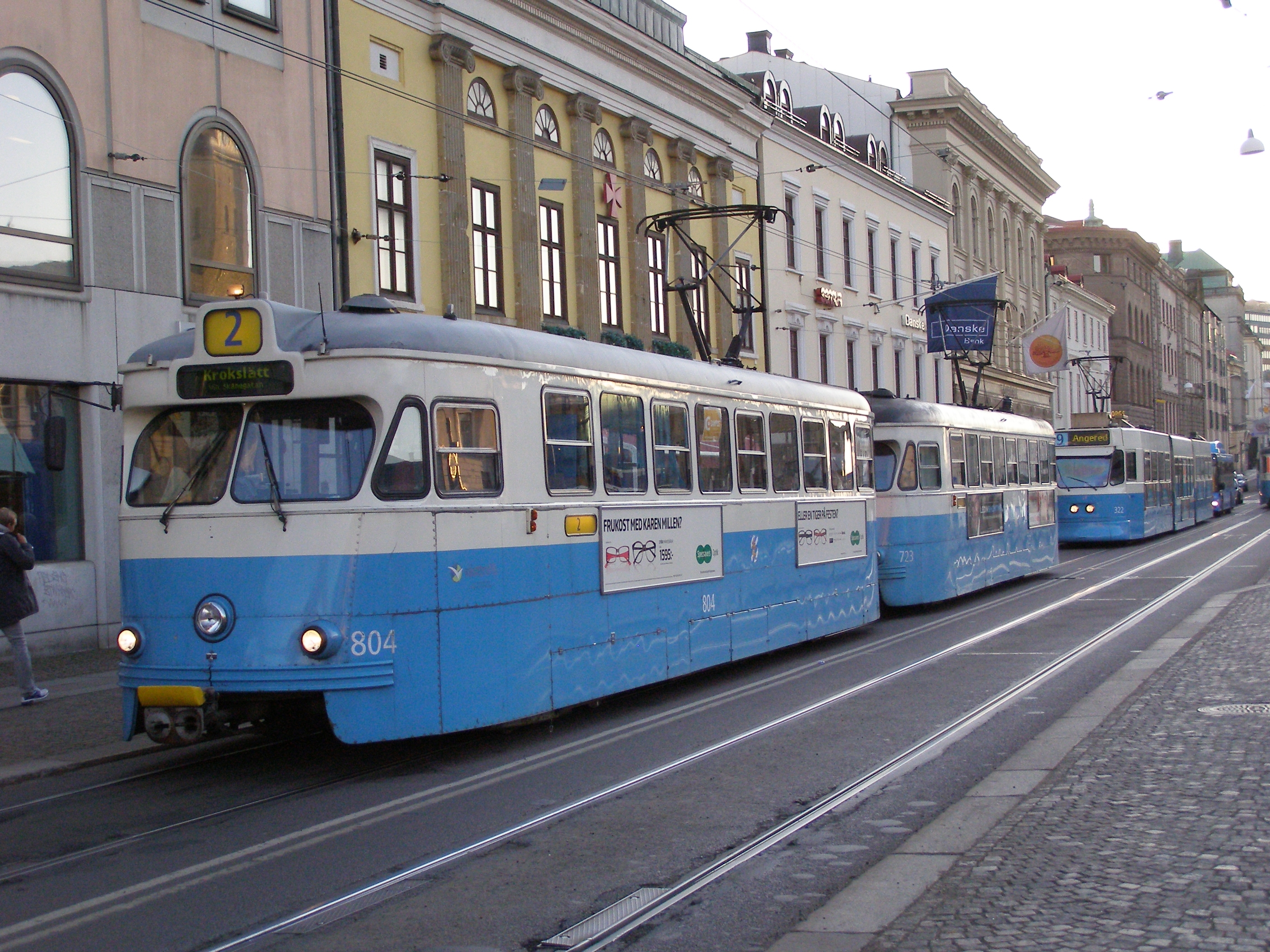
An M29 tram on line 2.

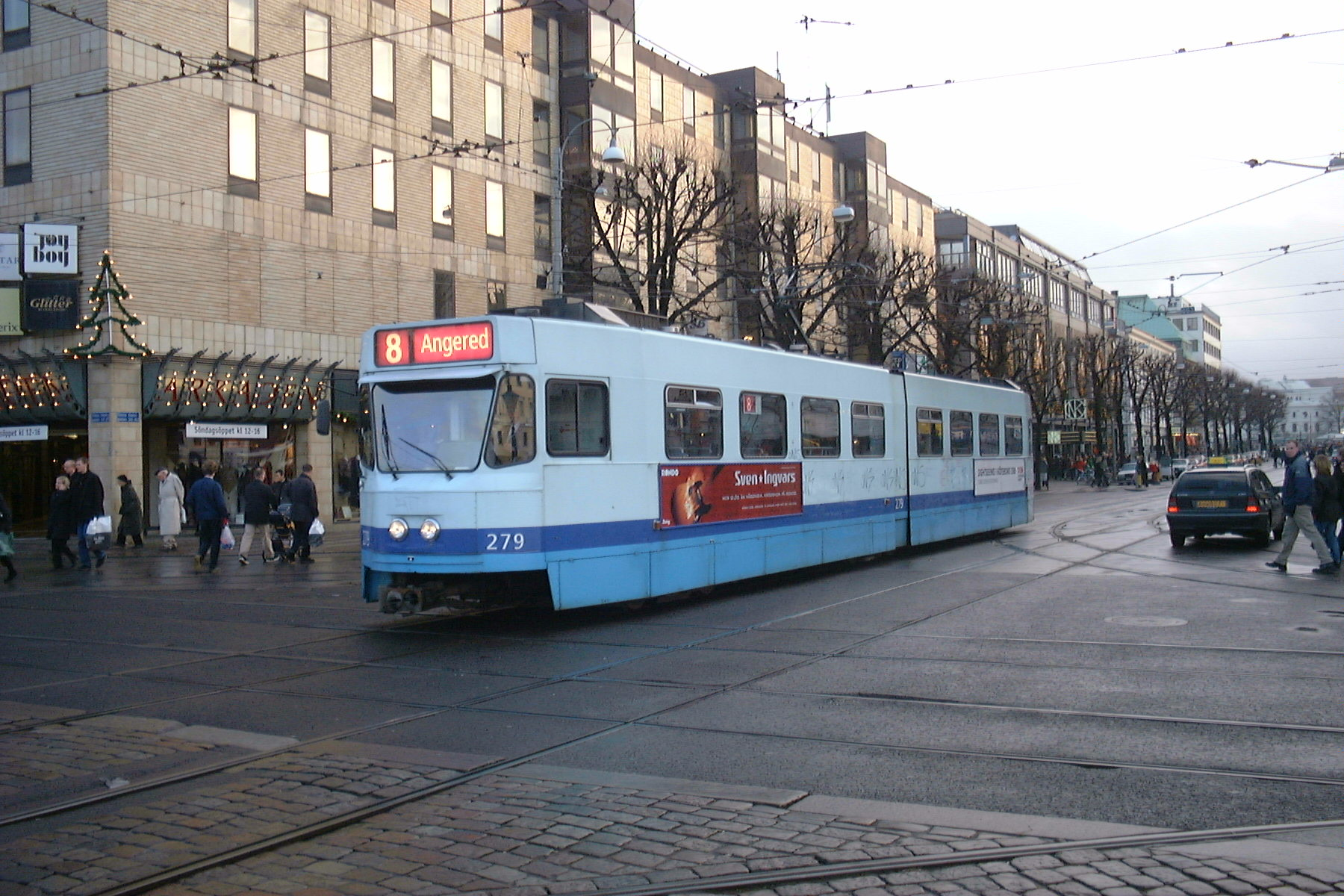
An M21 tram at Brunnsparken.

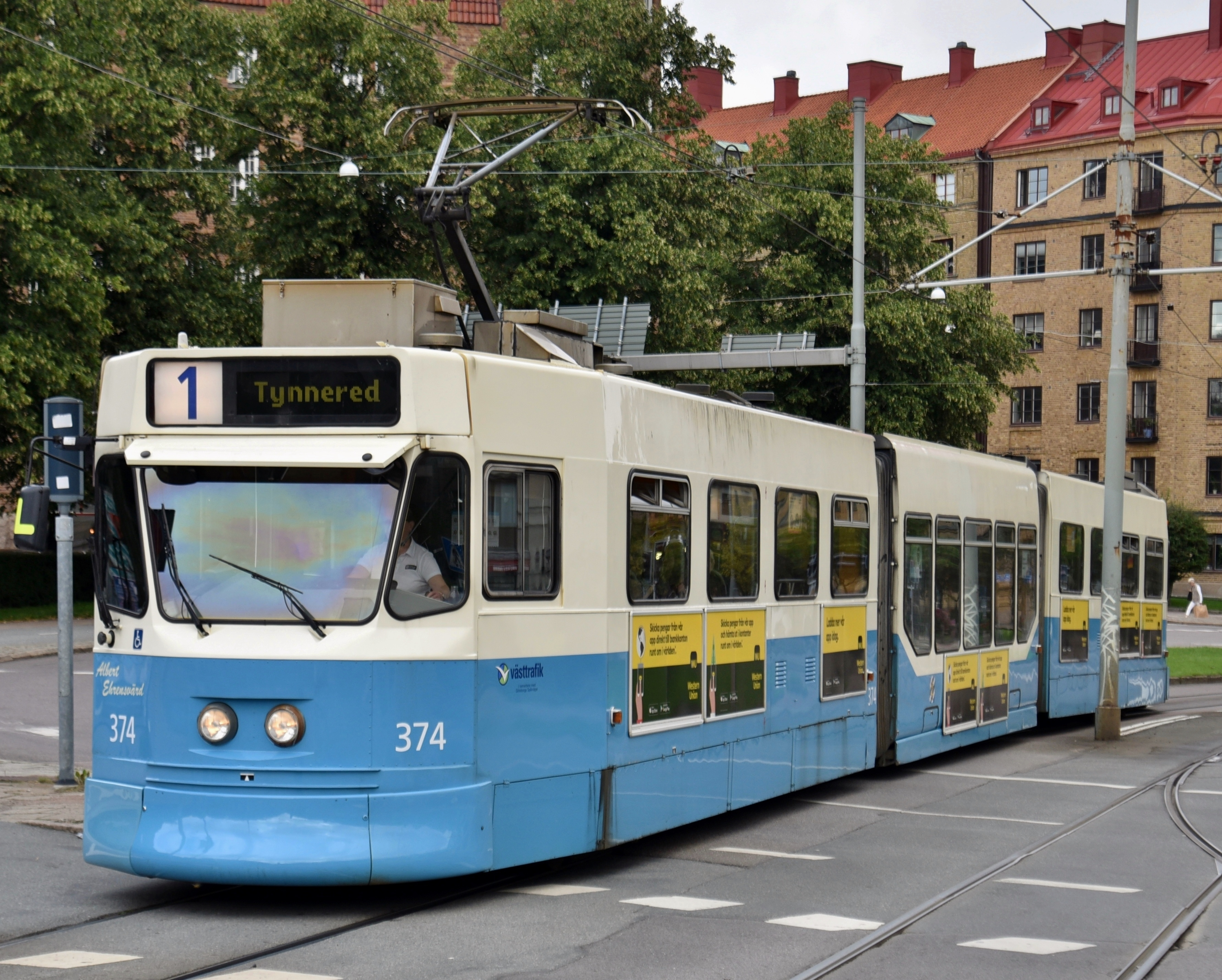
An M31 tram on line 1.

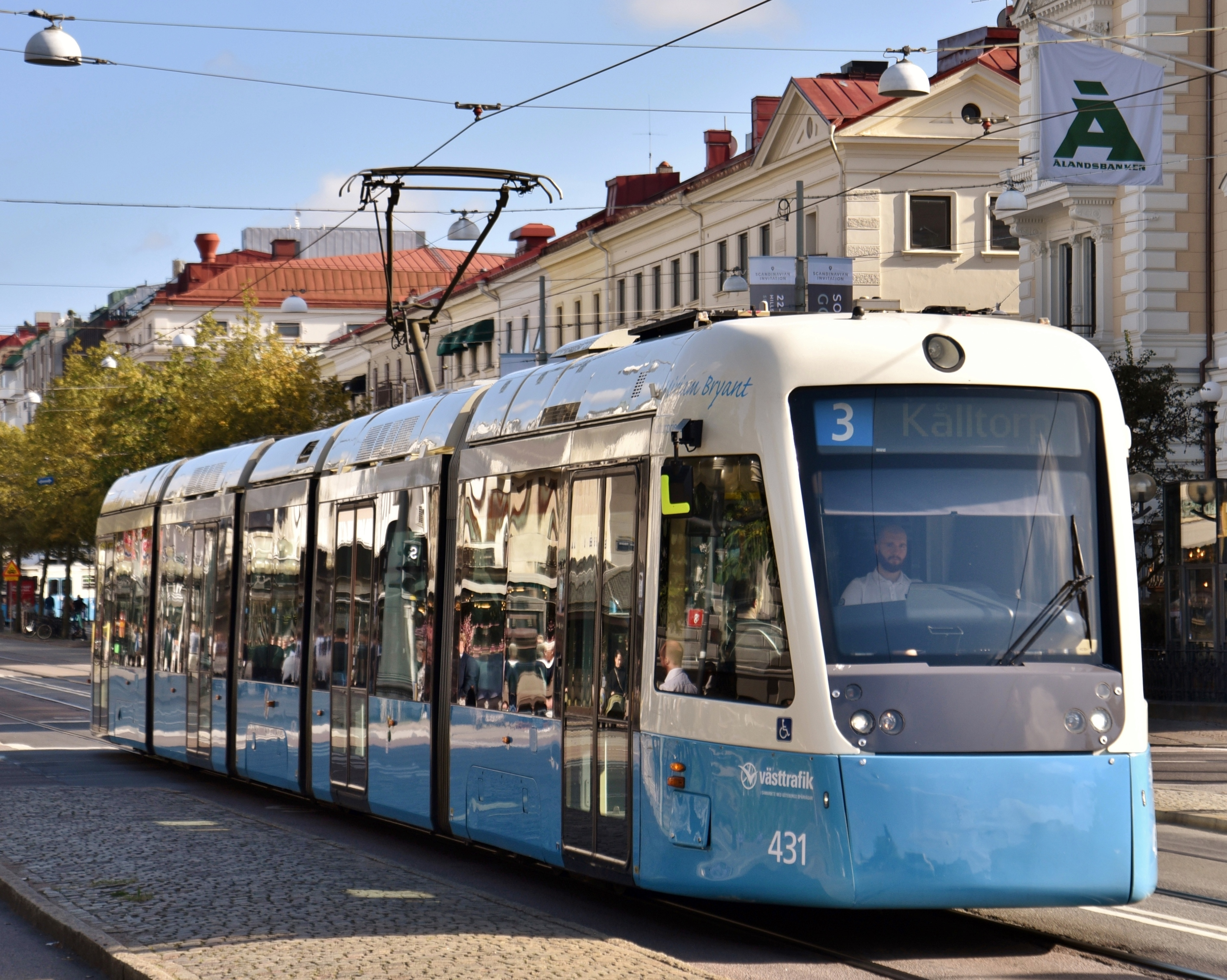
An M32 tram on Kungsportsavenyn.

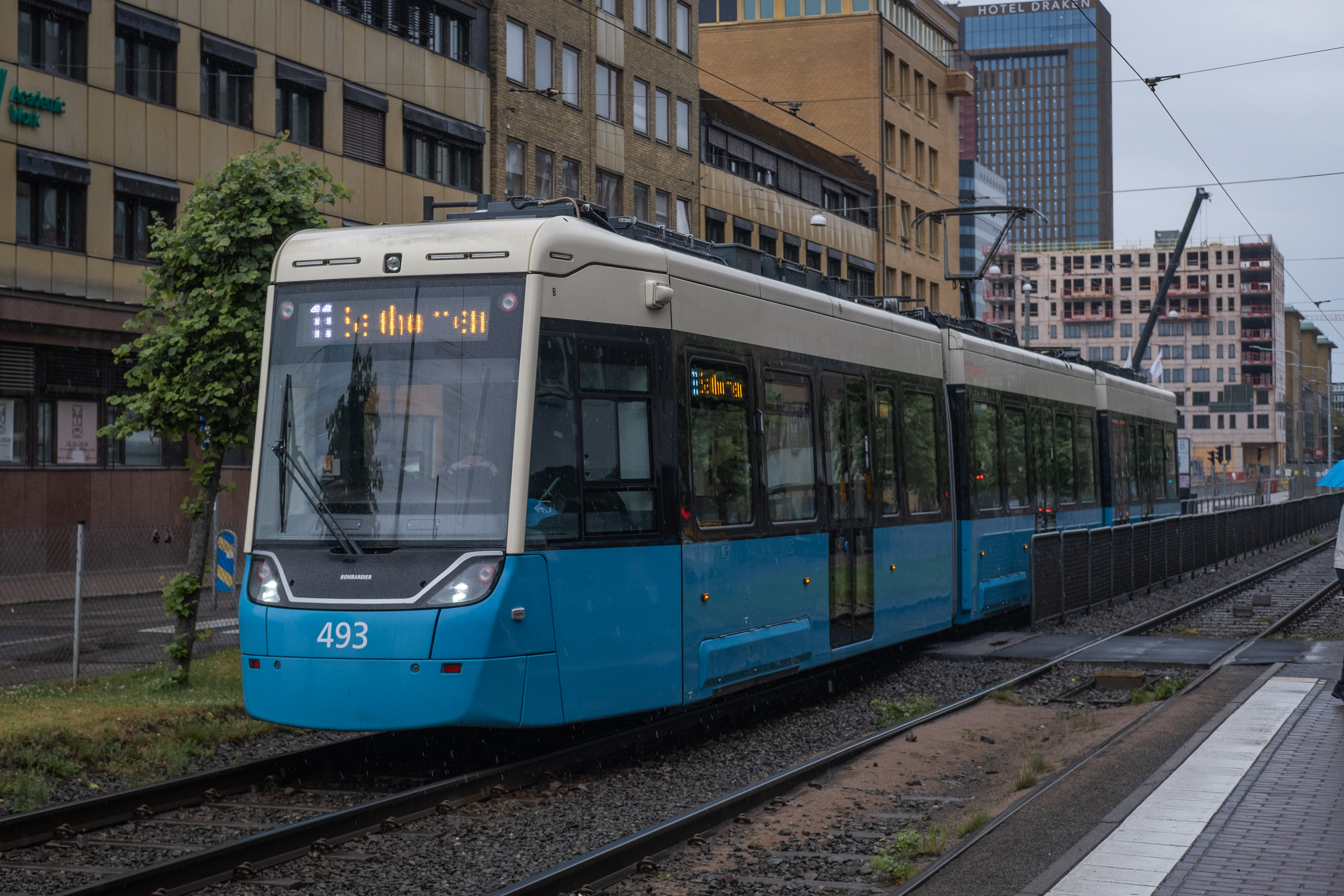
An M33 tram on line 11.

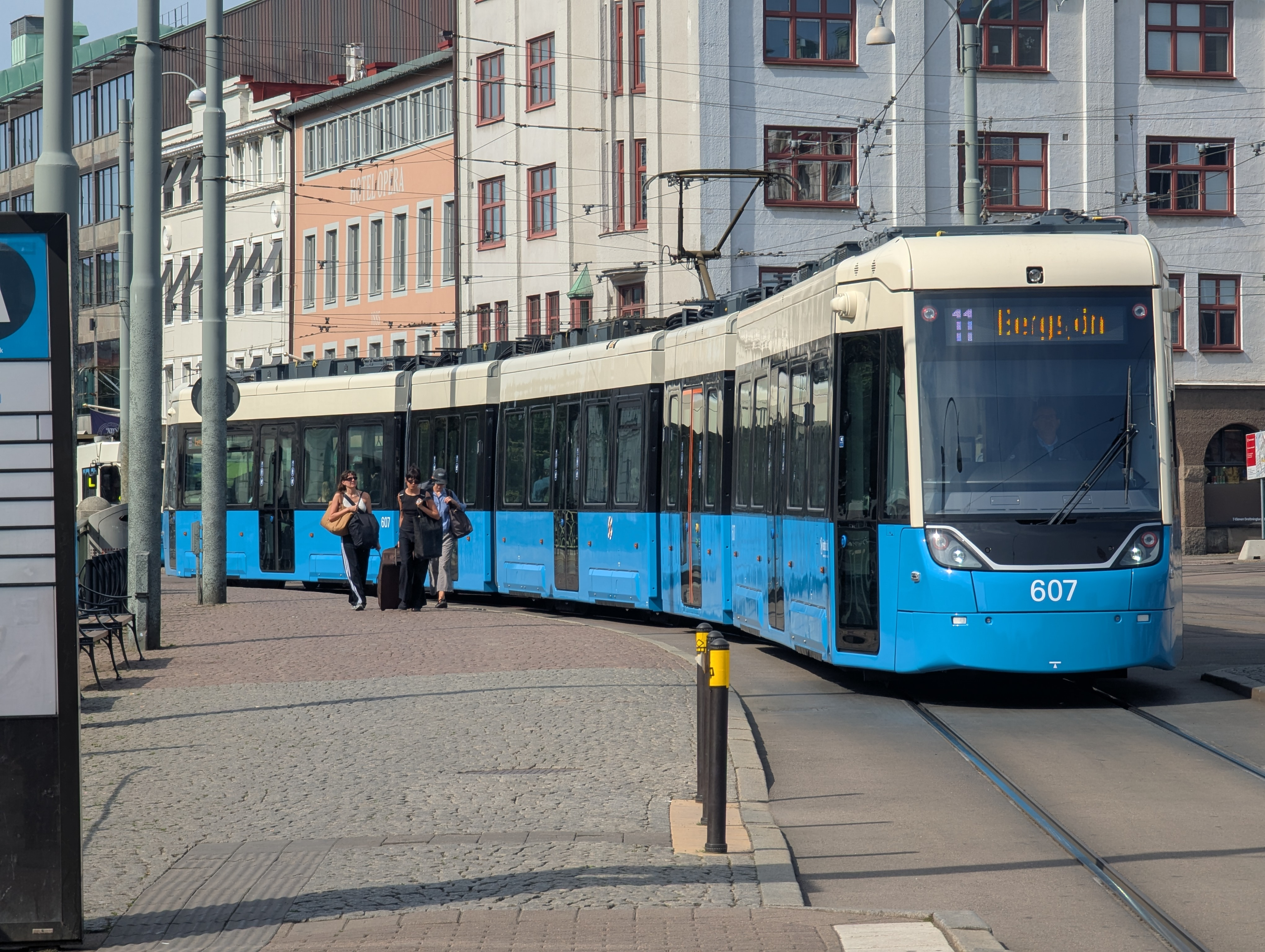
An M34 tram near the Gothenburg Central Station.

The Gothenburg Tramway (Swedish: Göteborgs spårväg) is the public transport system of trams in the city of Gothenburg, Sweden. Forming the backbone of transport in Gothenburg, the tramway serves larger parts of the city and surrounding urban areas. The traffic is operated by Göteborgs Spårvägar AB and the infrastructure is managed by the Gothenburg Traffic Administration Office, while Västtrafik AB serves as the transit authority. The current contract to drive the tramway traffic is valid until the year 2034.

Currently, the tramway system consists of 132 stops on 12 regular lines in service. Most lines pass through Brunnsparken, which is effectively the central hub of public transport, with departures approximately every 10 minutes during rush hour. The network consists of 176 km (109 mi) of single track, making it the largest tramway network in the Nordic countries by length. In 2024, the ridership was an estimated 125 million people.

Trams have operated in Gothenburg since 1879. The Liseberg Line is an independent heritage line co-operated by the Ringlinien Tramway Society. The trams of Gothenburg are an iconic feature of the cityscape.

== History ==
=== Prehistory ===
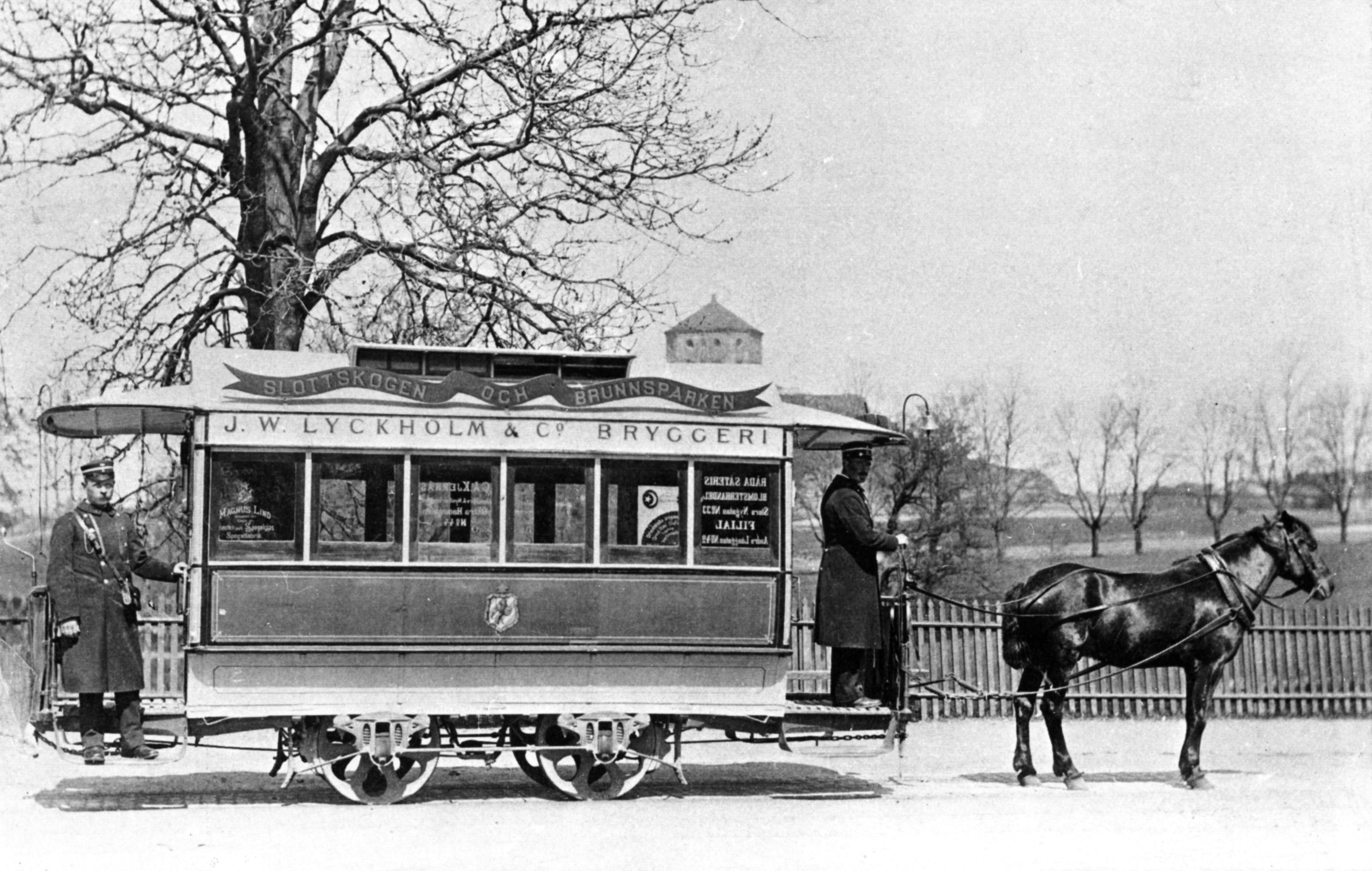
A horse-drawn tram near Slottsskogen, c. 1900. The Skansen Kronan can be seen in the background.

In spring 1836 there were plans to develop traffic between the centre of Gothenburg and Klippan. The newspaper Göteborgs Handels- och Sjöfartstidning campaigned for this, and an advantage for omnibuses was that people could have "tickets, small parcels and requests" delivered to Masthugget, Varvet, Majorna, Klippan and all the way towards the mouth of the river. The required starting capital was five thousand riksdaler, which could be achieved through sales of shares of fifty riksdaler each. In late April 1836 there were annoncements for "Gleerupska bokhandlen" on "Stora Hamngatan", and in July 1836 it was announced that a company had been founded. The company was led by Carl Fredrik Kjellberg, Johan Norström, J.R. Melin, Heinrich Röhss and Elias Ahrenberg.

The wagons were planned to be drawn by two horses and carry eight passengers. In December 1836 "Resetourene för Omnibus" were announced in newspapers. At the time of inauguration, the traffic only ran on weekdays. The first wagons started at nine in the morning from Stigbergsliden to the city centre, where the stop was located in front of the Frimurarlogen house on Södra Hamngatan. The wagons turned back towards Stigbergsliden at half past nine in the morning, where they continued to Klippan and turned back at eleven in the morning. The ticket cost was eight skillings, which was paid on entry to the wagon to get a ticket, which was then put in a box by the door at the stop of the journey.

The omnibus traffic lasted regularly for the whole of the year 1837, and in the following year, the timetable was extended with Sunday journeys to Lärje with a stop at Gamlestaden. The omnibus traffic had a practical monopoly on Gothenburg's public transport until the inauguration of the horse-drawn tramway.

=== Horse-drawn tramway ===
Stockholm got a horse-drawn tramway in 1877, and outside Sweden, New York City got one already in 1852 and Copenhagen in 1862. In 1873 there was a first proposal to construct a tramway in Gothenburg. Lieutenant Carl Wettergren thought it would be possible to have tram traffic in Gothenburg in 60 years. The proposal was rejected in 1874 both by the city council and by the King in Council. The city council's reason for the rejection was "that a private person should have rights to the construction and the city should be given the right to freely oversee the streets and open squares the tracks would be built on". The next proposal came in September 1875 when Aron Philippson made a proposal to the city council to build a tramway in Gothenburg. The city council appointed a committee of five people, including Philipsson. The other committee members were Josef Richert, Carl Gustaf Prytz, James Keiller and August Kobb. In June 1877 the committee made a proposal to the city council to build a horse-drawn tramway in Gothenburg.

After studies in Copenhagen as well as Christiania, there was a proposal to build three tram lines: Redberget - Klippan, Brunnsparken - Getebersgäng and Haga - Slottsskogsparken. The city council approved this proposal, with the exception that the line to Klippan should only go to Stigbergsliden. The committee got an offer for the construction of the tramway and the operation of the tram traffic. A short time afterwards the committee made a new proposal for the concession of the Gothenburg tramway from the captain Carl Christian Juell in Copenhagen. Juell had decided on a tram line from the St. John's Church to Klippan, because he thought the hills in Majorna would make traffic lethally dangerous to both people and horses. His technical explanation was as follows: "Everything depends on the brakes on the outgoing trip, and despite all care taken in the construction of the trams it would be impossible to account for the case where the brakes broke." According to Juell, it would be both cheaper and easier to build a steamship line to Majorna.

On 18 October 1877, the Gothenburg city council approved captain Juell's proposal with 29 votes for and 18 votes against and gave him a concession of 40 years, during which time the concession owner had the right to tramway traffic in Gothenburg. The conditions included:

- that the city council would at one point decide on the tram routes and costs
- that the passenger fare should be set at 10 öre for each traffic district within four thousand feet
- that the lines should travel at least every twenty minutes
- that the traffic system should be ready to use two years after the concession was approved, at the latest.

Captain Juell proved to have problems with financing his project, and in 1879 the city council approved to transfer the concession to William Barfoot from Leicester, to him personally instead of to a company. The concession for the tramway was later taken over by Henry Alexander Milne and after his death in 1881 to his son-in-law Richard Gard'ner.

The first tram line in Gothenburg was started in 1879 by the Gothenburg Tramways Company Ltd, based in England. This was a horse-drawn tramway, which stretched from Brunnsparken to Stigbergsliden. The city bought the tramway by the end of 1899, and introduced electrically powered trams only three years later when Sigfrid Edström led the electrification of the trams. During the next 40 years, the tram system was heavily expanded, reaching outside the city borders by 1907, and Hisingen in 1940.

The first tram line in Gothenburg was a line between Brunnsparken and the start of Stigbergsgliden - a distance of 2.7 kilometres - which was opened on 24 September 1879. The trip with four horsecars started at 16:00 in the afternoon and took about 15 minutes and "passengers were thereafter invited for refreshments at the local Henriksberg restaurant". The tram line opened for public traffic on the following day, with a tram starting at Stigbergsgliden at 07:30 in the morning and from Brunnsparken at 08:00 in the morning. Trams left thereafter every 15 minutes, until 21:00 and 21:30 respectively. The tram fare was 20 öre per person, from one terminus to the other. However, there was a tax of ten öre in the middle, at the swimming pool in Haga. There were no stops for passengers to embark or disembark, instead the trams stopped anywhere they could along the way by the request of the passengers, except at uphill climbs. The trams navigated their way among the pedestrians so that the coachmen used a ringing bell. Some coachmen had personal ring signals so that passengers could hear from the signal who was the coachman at the time.

The first ceremonial shovel load for the tramway was dug at the intersection of the streets Södra Allégatan and Sprängkullsgatan on 16 July 1879. The construction was directed by the engineers Richard Gard'ner and H.R. McKeone.The trams were brown and drove on single tracks on a metre-gauge railway, and by 1882 four lines had been constructed. In 1896 there were 36 trams, 4 buses and 126 horses in service in the Gothenburg public transport with a total passenger count of 2.7 million in trams and 38,831 in buses. The lines were as follows:

- 24 September 1879: Brunnsparken - Stigbergsgliden (2.82 km or 9,500 feet)
- 9 December 1881: Brunnsparken - Redbergslid (2.3 km)
- 1881: Brunnsparken - Getebergsgäng (2.34 km)
- 3 October 1882: Brunnsparken - Slottsskogen (2.98 km)

(In 1898 the terminus stop at Brunnsparken was moved to Drottningstorget so the linbe could go over the recently completed Victoriabron bridge. This shortened the line to 2.62 km.)

The first company for the tram staff was founded on 27 November 1885, on the initiative from the tram conductor at the Gothenburg tramway, J. Melanoz. An influential staff member in Gothenburg was J.A. Larsson (with the staff member number 26). The daily pay (for 14 hours) for a tram conductor was 1 krona and 90 öre and that for a tram driver was 2 krona and 10 öre.

The horse-drawn tramway was operated by a British company called The Gothenburg Tramways Company Ltd, and by the time the tramway was to be electrified the company asked for a sum of 70 thousand pounds to give up their right for the existing tramway system. After much discussion and trade, the Gothenburg city council decided on 4 April 1899 with votes 32 to 19 to buy the shares and concession from the British company and let the city of Gothenburg take responsibility of the tramway instead. The property was valued at 344 thousand krona and the concession at 900 thousand krona. An extraneous company meeting in London on 24 November 1899 accepted the trade, which also included the transfer of all tramway staff, about 180 people, with the exception of the tramway company director. The number of passengers was 3.5 million per year, which increased to 10 million in 1903, 20 million in 1908 and 30 million in 1915. The total net income for the same period was 8.7 million krona. The fares for the tramway and the buses were a constant question for the Gothenburg city council under the period from 1900 to 1962. The basic fare was originally set at 10 öre with a free-of-charge transfer of trams and this price lasted until 1919, at which time it was increased to 15 öre (10 öre for children). On 1 January 1941 the fare was increased again, to 20 öre (15 öre för children, 10 öre from 1945). Under the entire 1950s, increases in prices and salaries raised the basic fare from 25 öre to 45 öre. On 1 July 1956 a part-specific fare was introduced, and the coupon price was first increased in 1961. In addition to the basic fare, there were various kinds of discounts under the whole period. The reason for the stability of the fares until the 1950s was that the Gothenburg tramway had operated with a profit for a long time. The exception was from 1918 to 1919 and in 1948 when the tramway operated with a loss.

At the end of the year 1899 the Gothenburg city council appointed an interim board for the Gothenburg tramway, consisting of Gustaf Boman, Wilhelm Henriques and August Koch, later completed with August Wijkander and the lieutenant J. Nyström, with the chief building engineer Figge Blidberg as the chairman of the board.

On midnight on 1 January 1900 the tram traffic was taken over by the city of Gothenburg, represented by the engineer Carl Axel Reuterswärd. The new tramway chief engineer J. Sigfrid Edström arrived from Zurich to Gothenburg on 12 October 1900. Edström stayed at this post until 29 June 1903 when he was appointed as the CEO of ASEA in Västerås. On 1 July 1903 Edström was succeeded by the engineer Erland Zell.

The track width was 1 metre, and the tracks were nailed on wooden planks of three inches in length each, at a distance of four feet from each other. The tramway had one track and there were meeting tracks for five-minute and ten-minute traffic. Inside each tram were 16 seats and 6 standing places on the rear platform. The tram park was gradually improved and in 1900 there were 32 covered and 17 open trams along with a total of 160 horses. The trams were painted brown. There were advertisements for Adolf Bratt & Co. and the Lyckholm brewery. A smaller advertisement cost 80 krona per year. Each tram was driven by only one horse, but there were auxiliary horses in use on the uphill climbs on Kungsportsavenyen and Viktoriagatan. These were taken care of by horse boys that attached their horses to the tram while it was moving, and then later detached them just as fast.

In 1900 the tramway the tramway had lasted 10,310 days of trams, 54,246 days of horses, 994,524 km of total travel by trams and 1,056,654 km of total travel by horses. At the turn of the year from 1900 to 1901 the total length of the tram track was 10,330 metres. All 160 tram horses had fully served their purpose by New Year 1902.

By the time the city overtook the tramway, the tramway office was located on the ground floor of a building at Södra Hamngatan 63. This was succeeded by an office on the second floor at the time when the tramway was electrified. In 1903 the head office of the tramway moved to Pustervik and new premises were founded for the gas company and the tramway. The premises soon became too small and in autumn 1920 the office was moved to Drottninggatan 33.

An advantage of the horse-drawn tramway was that passengers could embark on the tram at any place they wanted, except for uphill climbs. This meant there were no actual stops on the tramway. This caused huge demands on the conductor and the driver, and one of the orders for the drivers was: "The driver must have a keen eye for passengers, especially when the conductor is taking the fares." Another order was about the driving speed: "The driver is especially required to drive at a constant speed, so that the time taken between stations remains the same. All turns must be driven at a walking speed. Disobedience of these rules is punished with immediate dismissal." In other words, the driver had to step off the tram and walk along the horses when going through turns.

=== Electric tramway ===
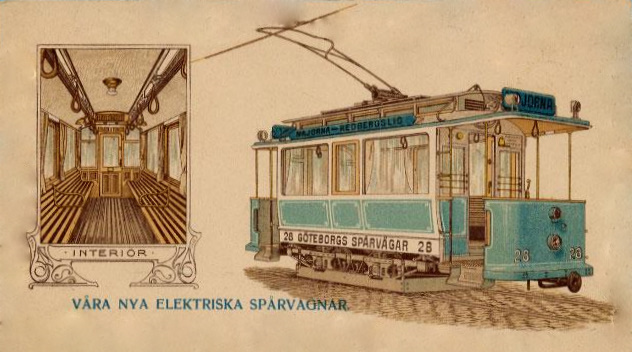
A postcard from 1902 showing the first electric trams in Gothenburg.

In 1895 there came the question of replacing the horse-drawn tramway with an electrified tramway as had already been done outside Sweden, which caused further renovations. At the start of the year 1901 Edström presented his idea of a complete renovation of the horse-drawn tramway and the introduction of electric drive to the tramway, with the power station located on the site of the old gasworks in Rosenlund. This was in conjunction with the idea to make the track wider from the original 1 metre to 1.435 metres as it is today. The city council approved Edström's idea, and it was taken into use on 16 July 1902 at Surbrunnsgatan as designed by the architect Hans Hedlund. The building was torn down in 1968.

At the turn of the year from 1902 to 1903 practically the entire tramway was fully electrified: the power station located at Rosenlund, the tram depots at Stampen and Majorna and the tram lines:

- Blue line: Majorna - Västra Hamngatan - Redbergslid
- Green line: Majorna - Västra Hamngatan - Getebergsäng
- Red line: Redbergslid - Brunnsparken - Getebergsäng
- White ring line: Drottningstorget - Lilla Bommen - Västra Hamngatan Annedal - Slottsskogen - Järntorget - Valand - Drottningtorget.

A total of 46 trams were delivered by ASEA, as well as 6 trams from Göteborgs Mekaniska Verkstad. The 160 horses on the old tramway were sold off in autumn 1902. The cost for the renovation was 4.2 million krona at the end of the year 1902, even accounting for the city's costs for accounting the city's cost for the concession of the horse-drawn tramway.

On 28 July 1902 at 03:30 in the night two newly delivered electric trams were taken on a test drive from Järntorget (Gothenburg Central Station Square) to Slottsskogsgatan. The introduction of the electrified tramway in Gothenburg did not entirely go without resistance, because many citizens of Gothenburg were afraid that the electricity lines would fall down or that the electricity would flow in the tram tracks. The tramway personnel was fully aware of this unease and therefore decided to conduct the test drive in the middle of the night in fully secrecy, with a start of the new tramway at Järntorget. The elegant new trams were painted blue with light brown window frames. The interior was painted light and dark brown with shades of ash and walnut. The test drive was conducted by the administration of the tramway personnel. The chairman of the tramway board Kock sat on the front platform of one of the trams right beside the driver, along with the director Sigfrid Edström and his assistant C.A. Reuterswärd. Inside the tram were also present the staff members Henriques, Boman, Nyström, Lamm and Bidberg. The other tram was to be driven by the inspector of the power station. The noise from the trams woke up sleeping people on Karl Johansgatan. The trip from Järntorget to Slottsskogsgatan took about 10 minutes.

On 29 July 1902 at 11:30 in the morning the electrified tramway was taken for an official test drive along with the chairman and board members of the city council, members of the press and employees from companies that had worked on the project. At the tramway board meeting on 29 July 1902, director Edström announced that "the test drive of the electrified tramway has taken place today on the line from Järntorget to Slottsskogsgatan, where the tramway board members and some other especially invited guests have personally travelled on the trams and the result has been seen as completely satisfactory."

The tramway line was opened for public traffic on 18 August 1902. The last of the horse-drawn tramway lines, which had travelled on Getebergsängslinjen, was removed on 28 October 1902. In contrast to the horse-drawn tramway, the electrified tramway was a standard-gauge railway with double rails, even on the lines that had previously had single rails. The current on the line was 600 V direct current. The four electrified tramway lines were marked with the colours white, blue, green and red, which are today used for the tramway lines 1, 3, 4 and 5 (the yellow line 2 only opened later when the white ring line was split in two). The line numbers were introduced in 1909, and since then line numbers and colours have been used in parallel.

The first guidelines for "the traffic on Gothenburg's electric tramway" was established on 24 April 1903. Section 16 on part II reads "The electric trams may not be driven at a speed faster than 350 metres per minute. On such street intersections and other places where there is risk of collision or other accidents, the speed must be decreased and may not exceed 100 metres per minute."

Since 1 June 1911 there had been mailboxes along the tramway routes, which were then emptied by the post office. The mailboxes were removed in July 1962.

On a suggestion from the director of the tramway board H. Henriques, large metal buckets with flowers were planted on tramway masts in 1903 on "the most important streets", such as Södra Hamngatan.

To be able to communicate with passengers, a loudspeaker system was set up at Järntorget on 28 March 1955.

When the Gothenburg tramway turned 65 years old as counted from the initial decision in 1877, a collection of statistics of 40 years since the introduction of the electrified tramway up to 1942 was done:

- In 1903 the total number of passengers was 10,630,000, and in 1941 this had increased to 76,730,000.
- The record year was 1939 with about 85 million passengers.
- The total number of kilometres travelled had increased from 2.5 million to 19.2 million.
- The total amount of electricity consumed had increased from 1.21 million kWh to 17.15 million kWh.
- The total length of the tramway track had increased from 31.3 km to 94.3 km.
- The number of trams had increased from 56 to 158
- The total cost of the tramway had increased from 4.37 million krona to 29.5 million, and the income from the tramway had increased from just over 1 million krona to 15.6 million.
- The number of tramway personnel had increased from 346 to 2,022 and the total cost of the personnel had increased from 326,000 krona to 8.5 million.
- During 40 years the trams had travelled 468 million kilometres and transported 1.9 million passengers.

In 1969 the trams started letting passengers in through the back doors. This meant the trams had to be rebuilt to accommodate this.

Trams on various lines in Gothenburg

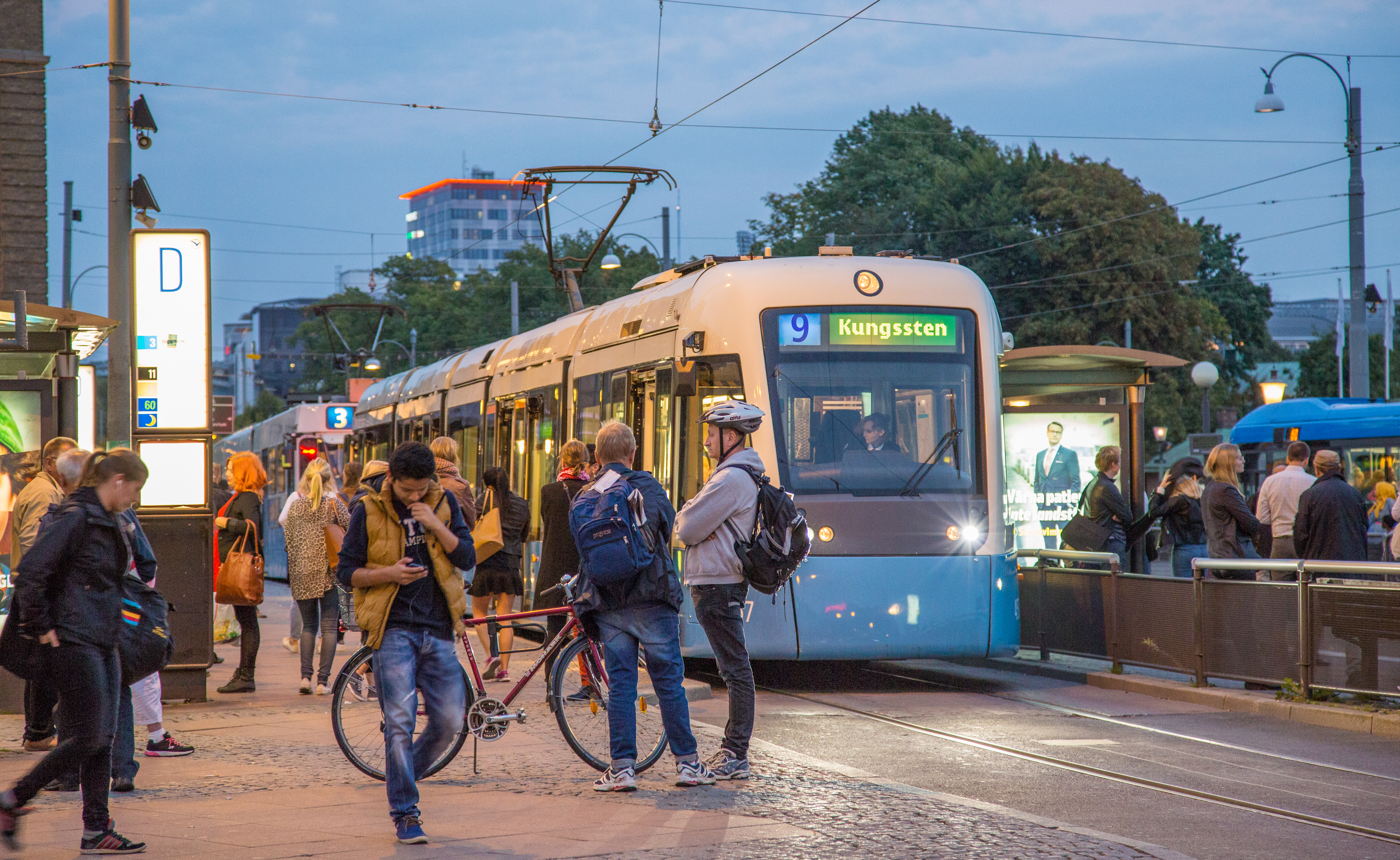

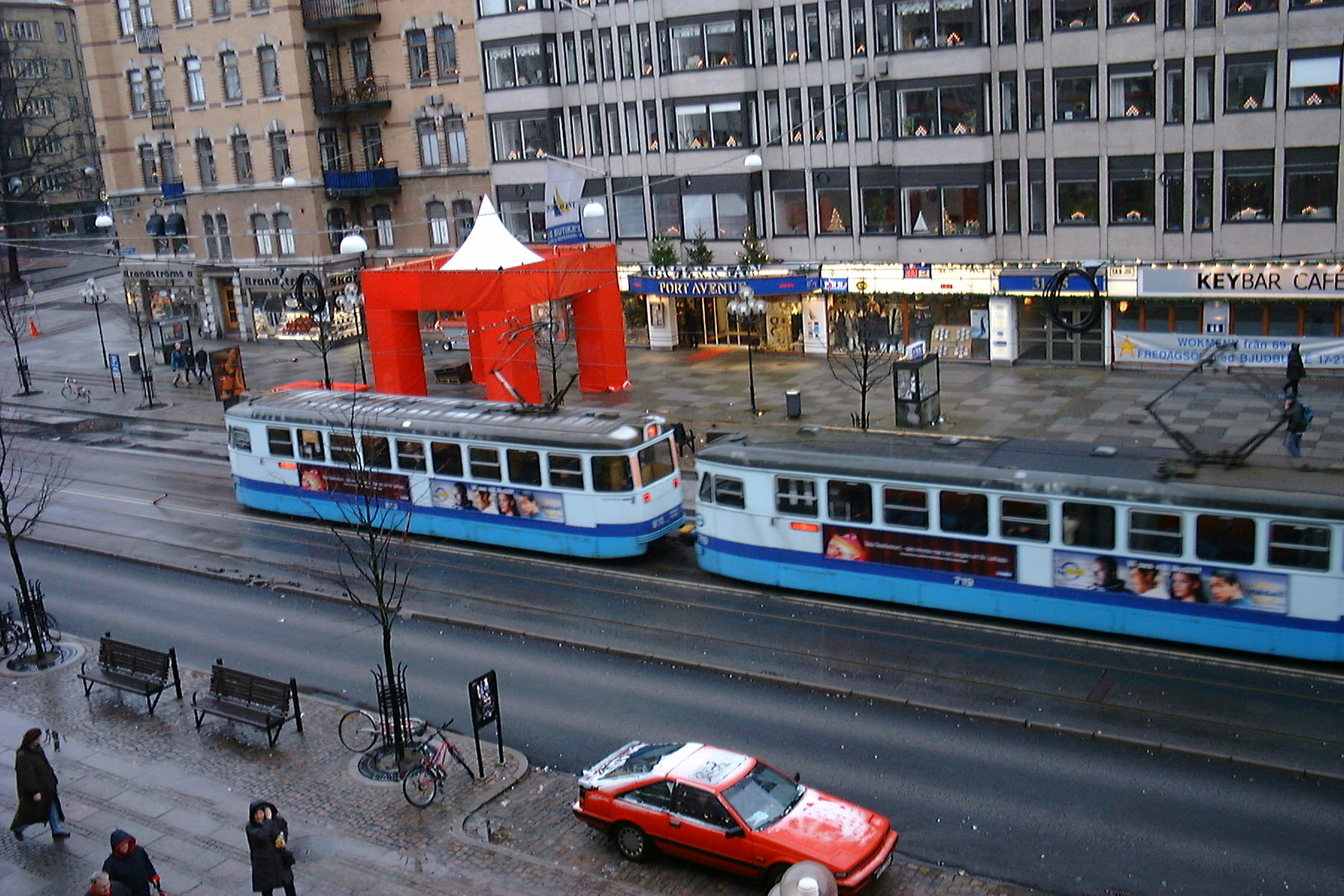

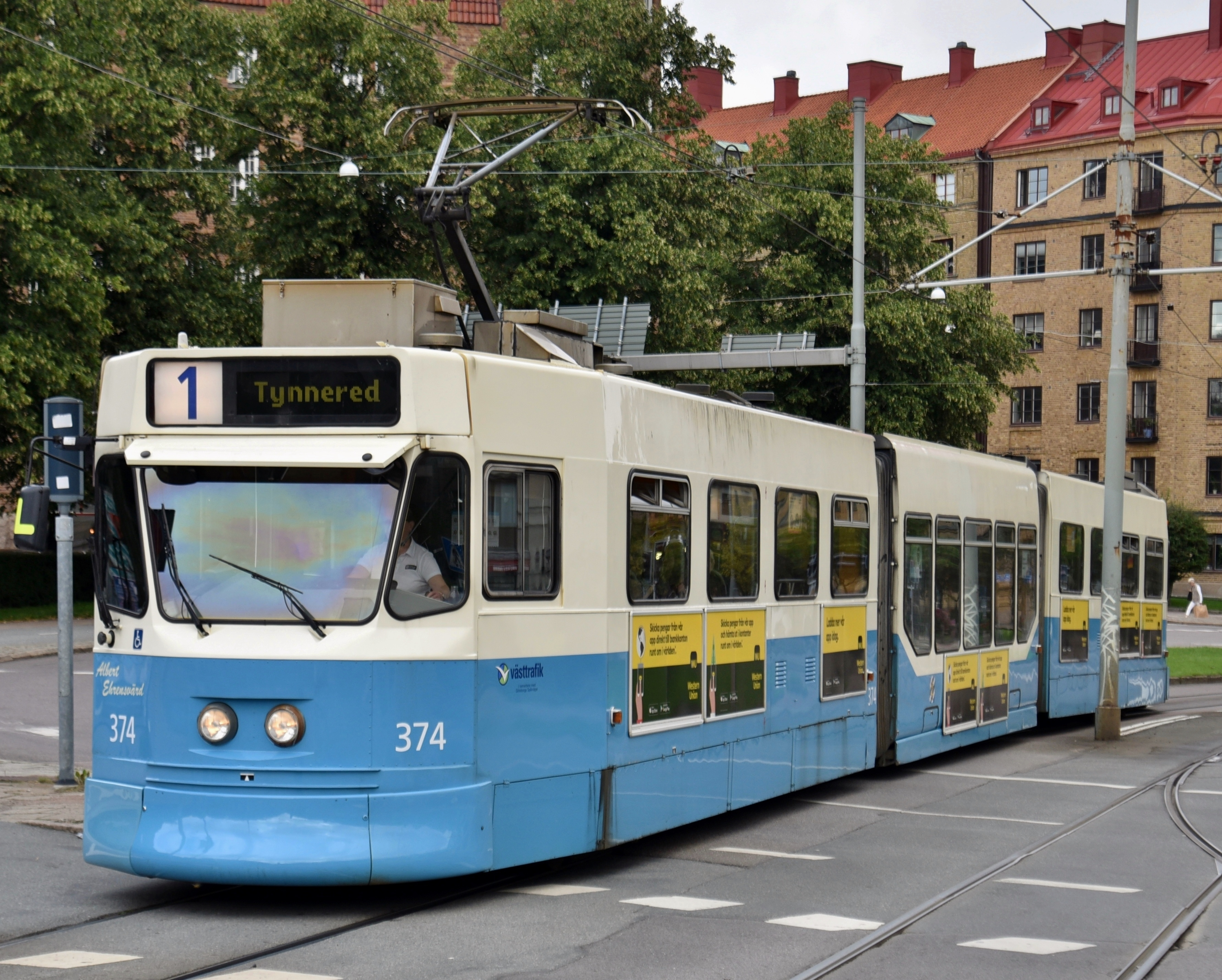

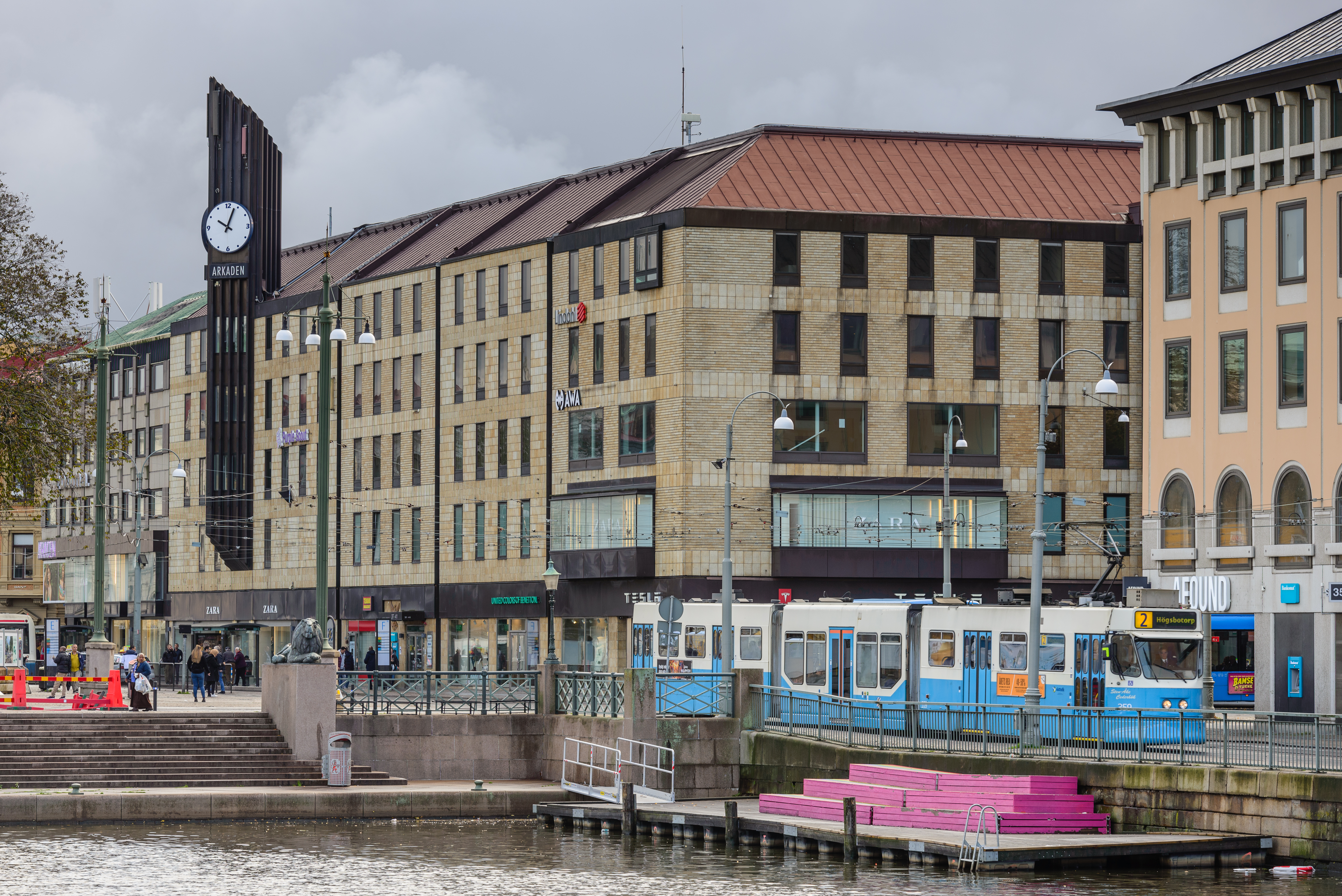

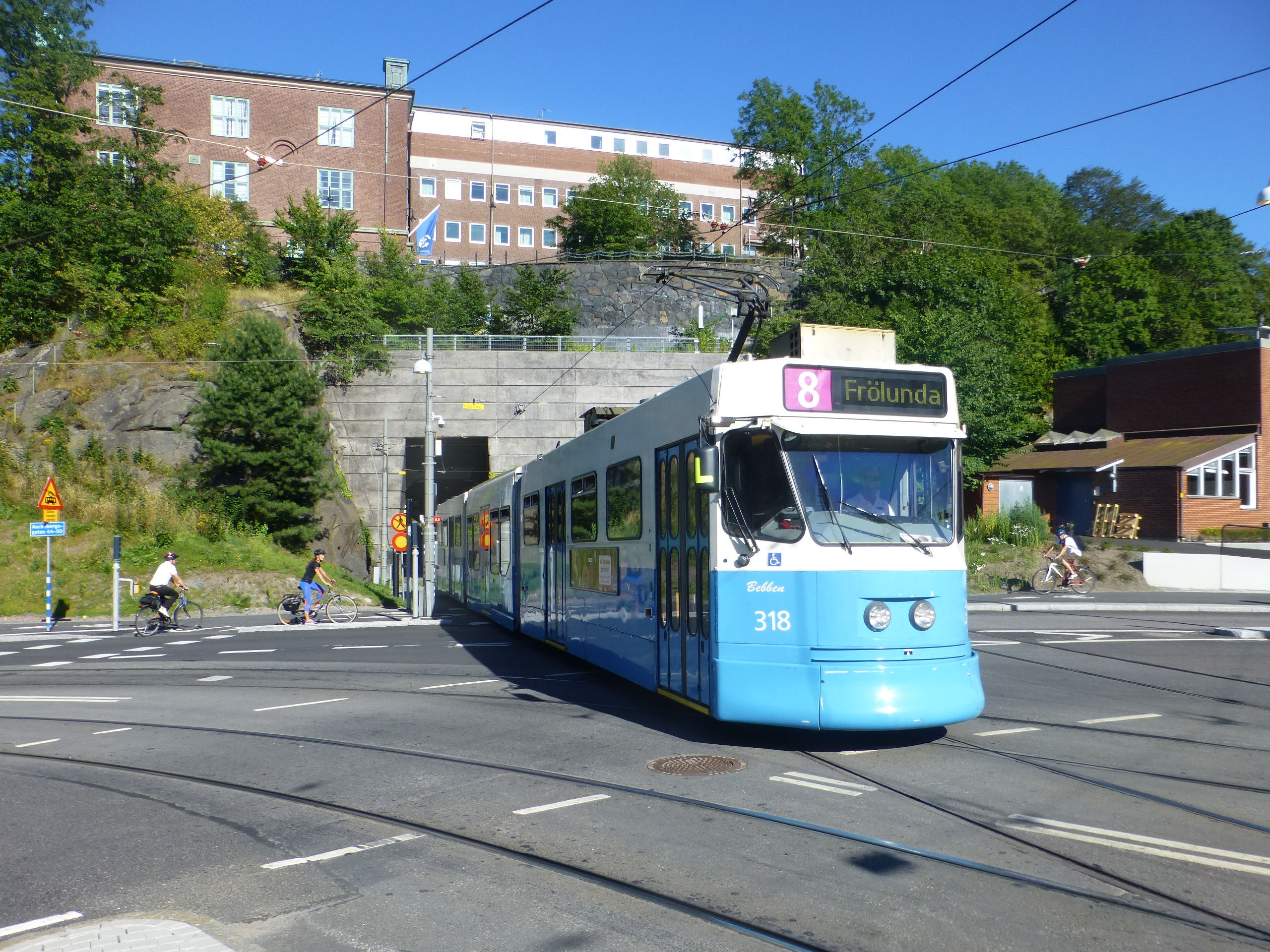

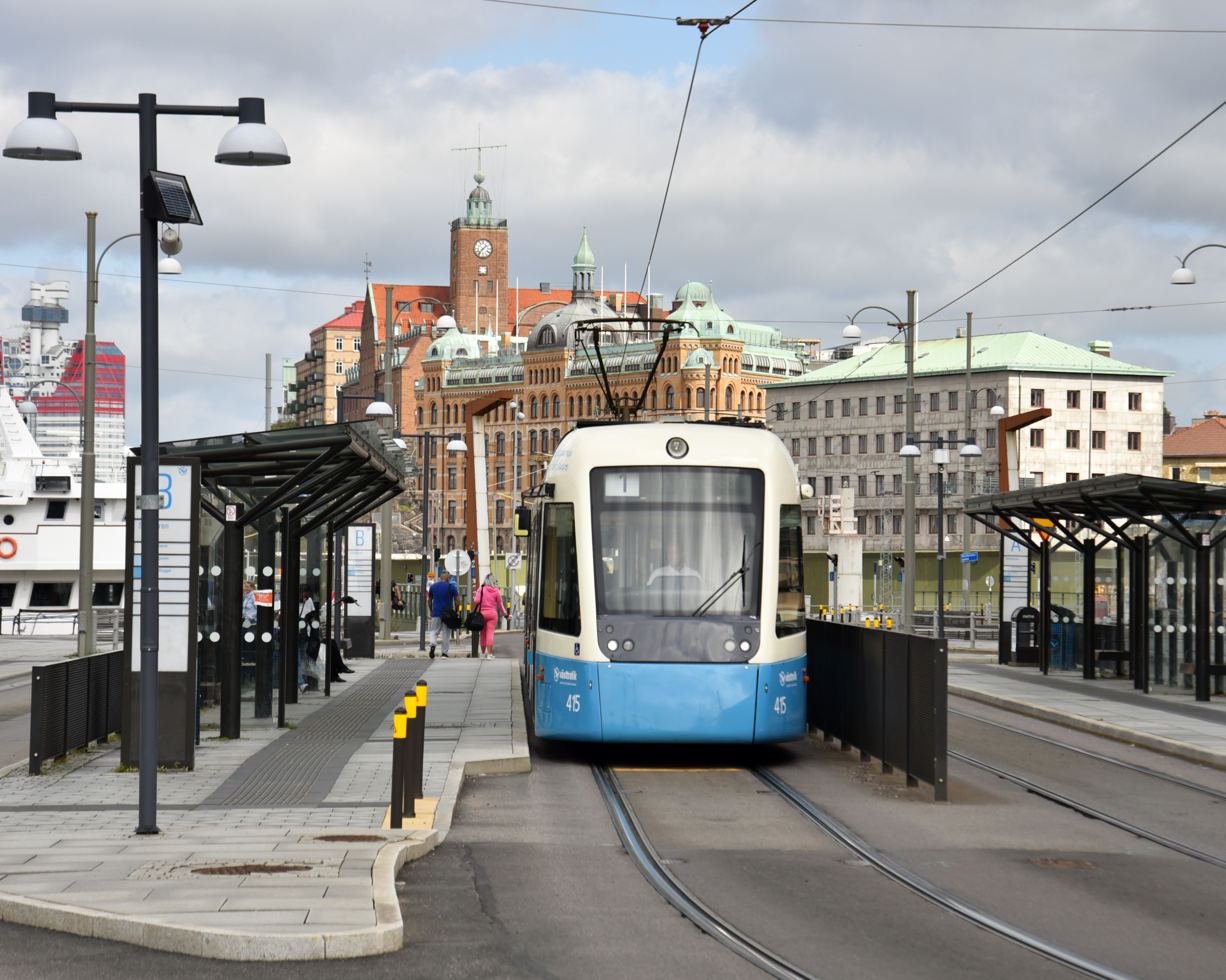

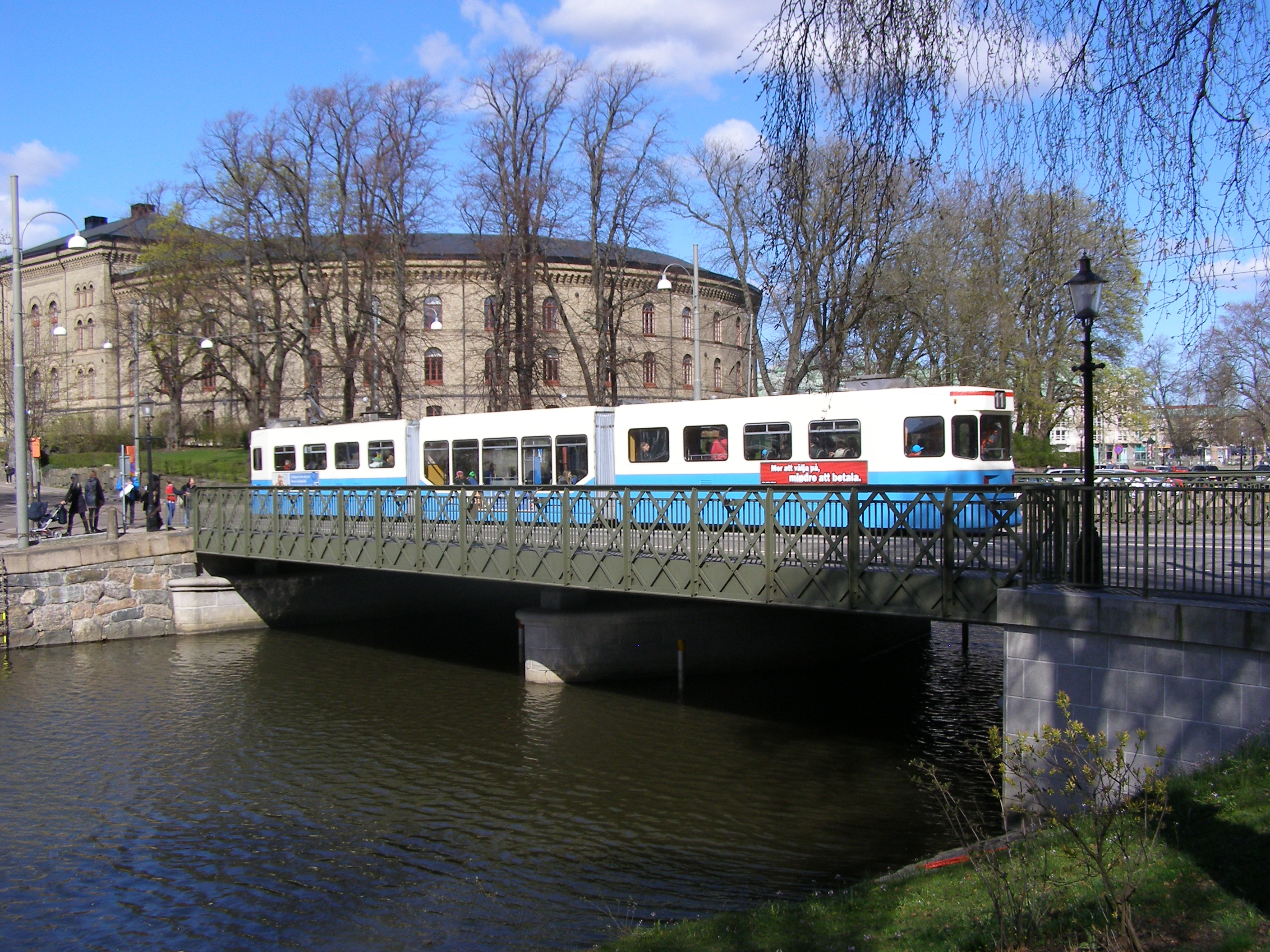

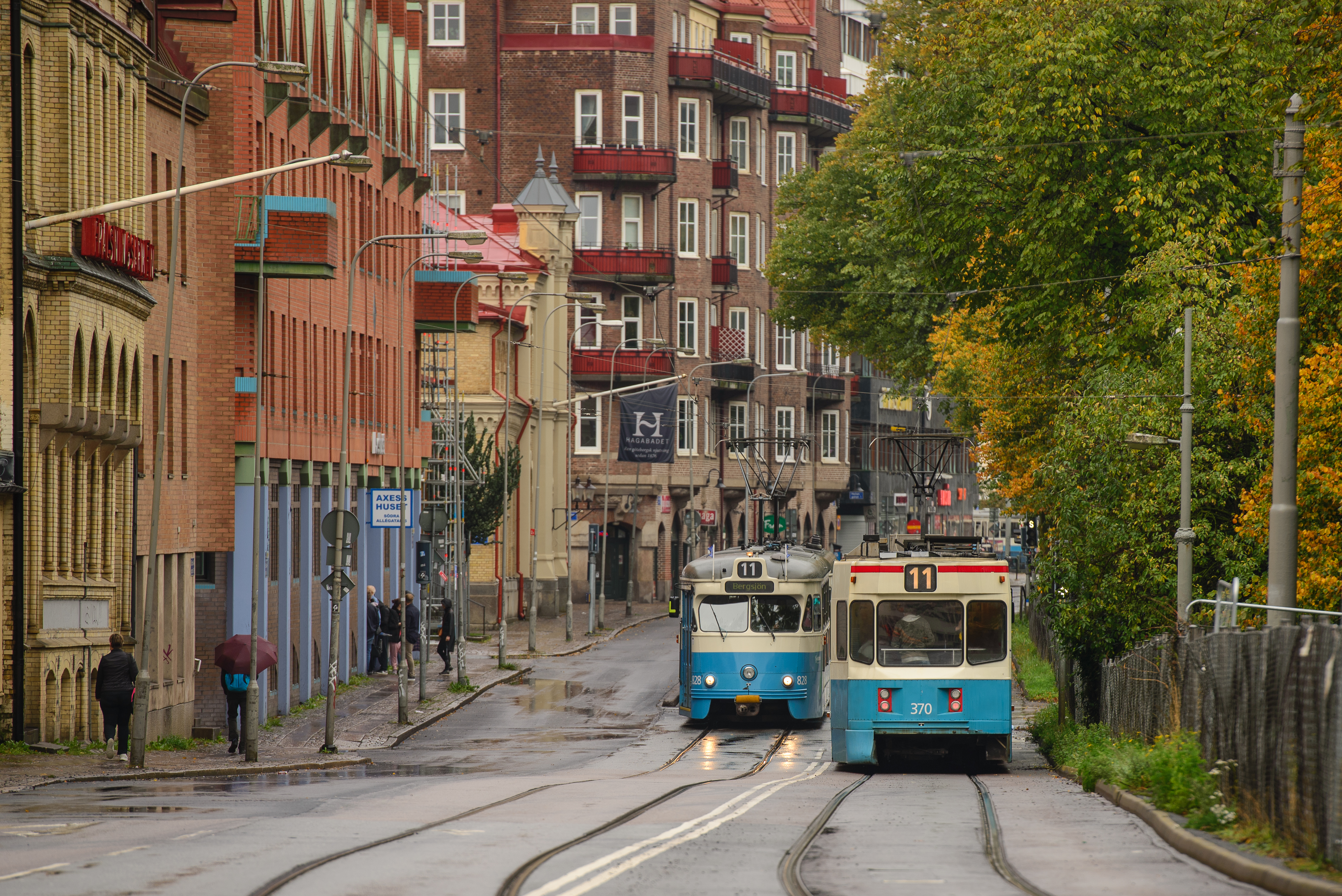

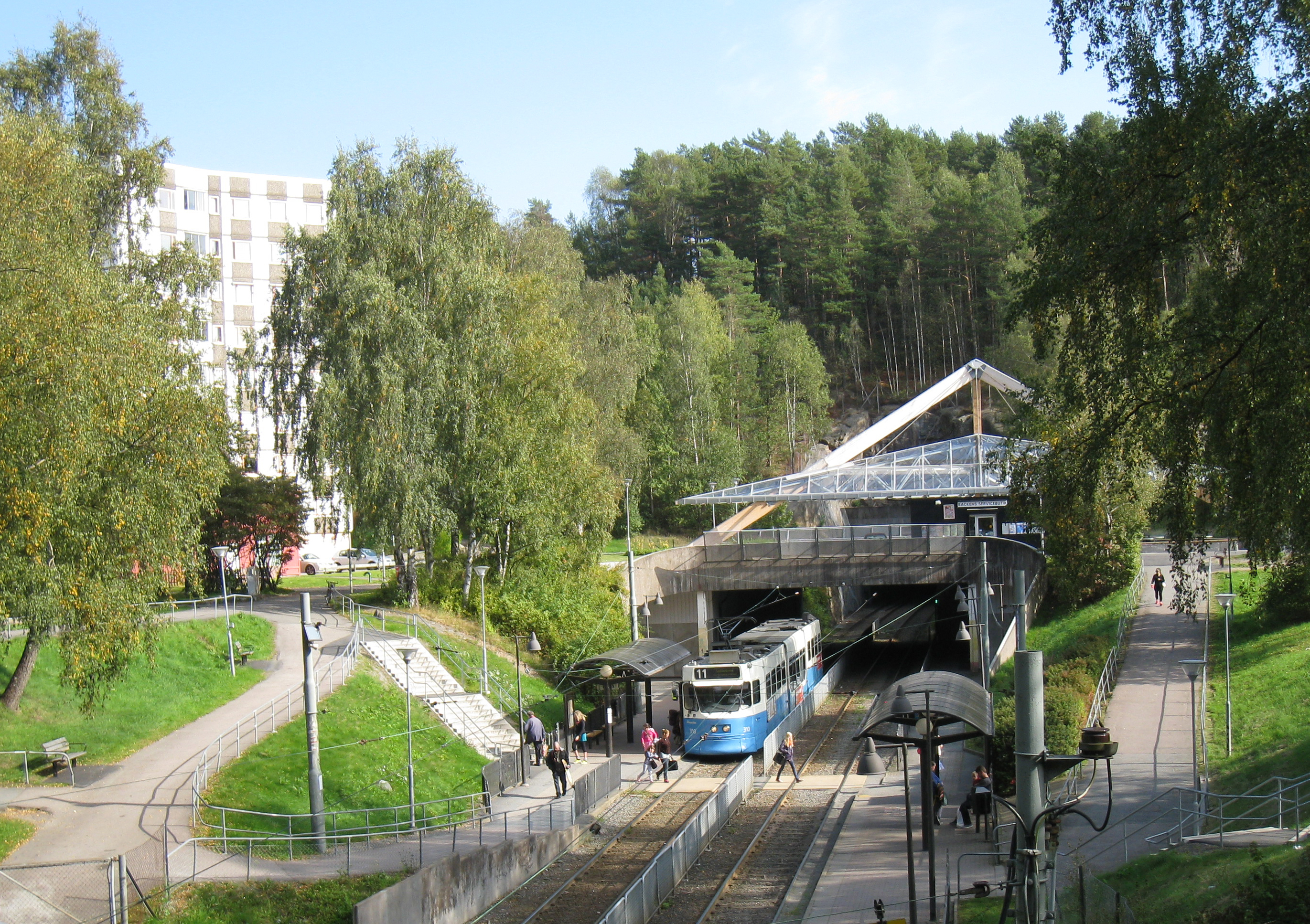

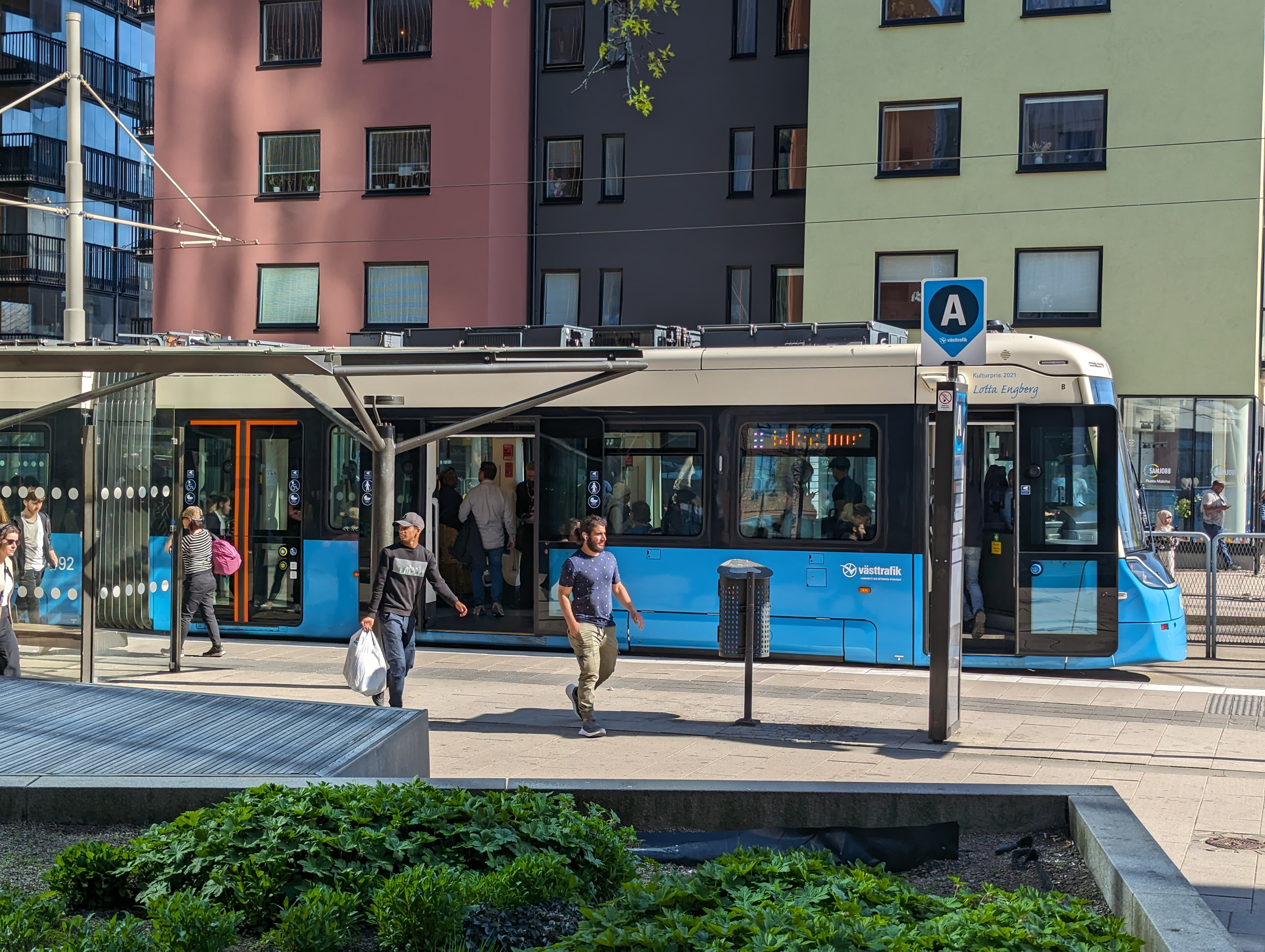

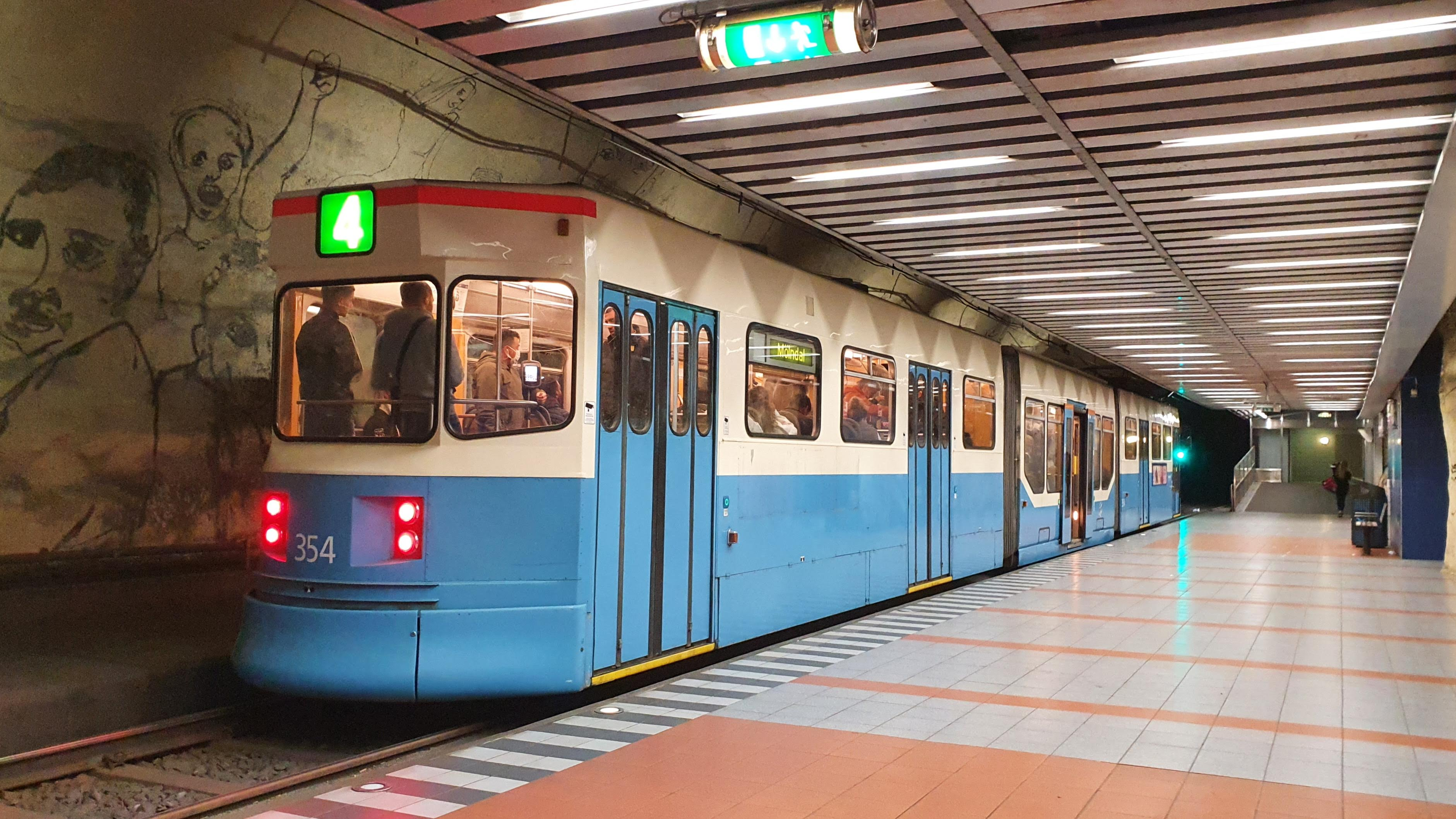

==== Metro or city railway? ====
In 1934 the director of the Gothenburg tramway Carl Axel Reuterswärd suggested to build a metro in Gothenburg in the future.

In the 1960s there were plans to convert the overground tram network into a metro in the city centre, with the first step being a premetro or a city railway (stadsbana) as it was called in Gothenburg at the time. New train sections to the suburbs of Angered, Lånsmansgården, Bergsjön and Tynnered were built free of level crossings, almost like metro tracks so they could be converted to a metro system in the future. The question of a metro in Gothenburg came up at the introduction of the express tramway (1967) where a city railway with one or two tracks was suggested. However, after further investigation, it later became apparent that it would be too expensive to build tunnels through the clay that Gothenburg centre had been built on. This was because of the economic stagnation in the 1970s which caused the resources for the infrastructure to diminish and investments to the tramway could not be made like before. The state of Sweden decided to invest in the Stockholm metro system instead. The decision in Gothenburg was to build an "express tramway" alternative which consisted of improvements to the existing tramway. Instead of becoming the first city railway line, the Angeredsbanan line was integrated into the existing tramway network, which meant that the line current had to be increased to match the 750 V current on Angeredsbanan.

==== Modern trams ====
The first M21 trams came to Gothenburg in 1984. Before this there had been a renovation of the tram network, including lengthening the track to the SU Östra sjukhuset hospital. In the early 1990s economic problems made the municipality of Gothenburg ask the question of whether it should continue with its current tram network, or only keep three to four lines travelled with M21 trams. The decision was to continue with the current tram network.

==== Future plans ====
Lately the politicians in Gothenburg have been of the opinion that the tramway in Gothenburg is a system worth investing in. The most prominent objection to the trams as a means of transport in Gothenburg is that they travel slowly through the city centre. One of the reasons for this is that the trams travel on street level, whereas to reach a metro station passengers would have to go underground. Metro stations also tend to be further apart than tram stops, which means an extra walking distance.

During the latest years the tram network in the centre of Gothenburg has been gradually complemented with the so-called Kringen Project (Kollektivtrafikringen, "Collective traffic ring"), creating a tramway ring around the city centre. In 1999, the first step was started, which most notably included new tracks the Chalmers Tunnel between Korsvägen and the Chalmers University of Technology opened to traffic in 2002, as well as the track on Skånegatan between Stampgatan via Ullevi and Scandinavium to Korsvägen. In addition to this, the Sahlgrenska University Hospital has been connected to Linnéplatsen via Annedal and new tracks on the southern shore of the river Göta älv.

==== Advertisements ====
On 5 January 1959 advertisements were used on trams in Gothenburg for the first time. Advertisements on Gothenburg trams are managed by the company Wallstreet Media.

==== Three-car trams ====
Three-car trams with three pedal cars coupled together premiered on the Gothenburg tramway on 21 February 1966 on line 2. These trams were 45 metres long. These three-car trams have later also been used on lines 6 and 7, when the timetable was made less frequent on various periods. Today, the tram stops in Gothenburg are too short for trams this long to fit. On the Angeredsbanan track four-car M25 trams have been used on times of high traffic.

==== Switch to right-hand traffic ====
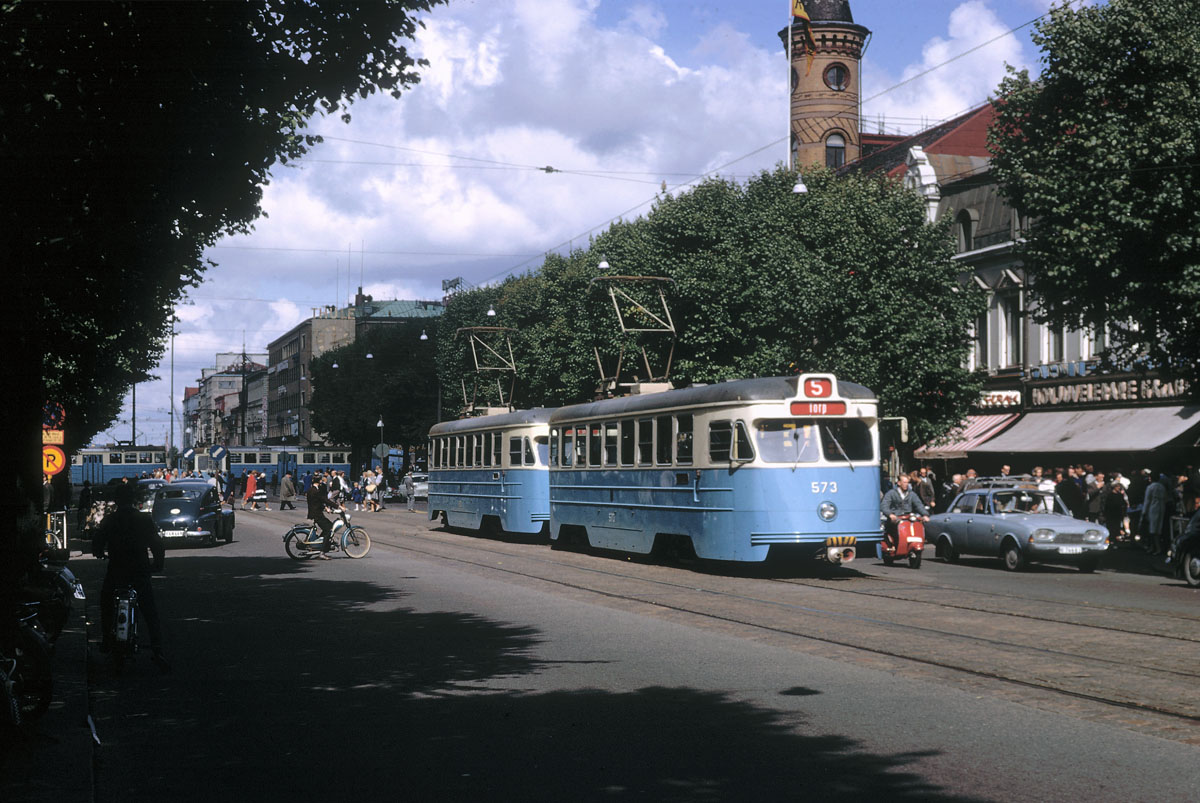
An M25 driving down the Avenyn, 1963. This was prior to the driving side switch

When Sweden's switch to right-hand traffic in 1967 made existing unidirectional trams obsolete, Gothenburg was one of only two cities in Sweden to maintain its city-centre tramway, the other such network to survive being the Norrköping Tramway.

==== Modern developments ====
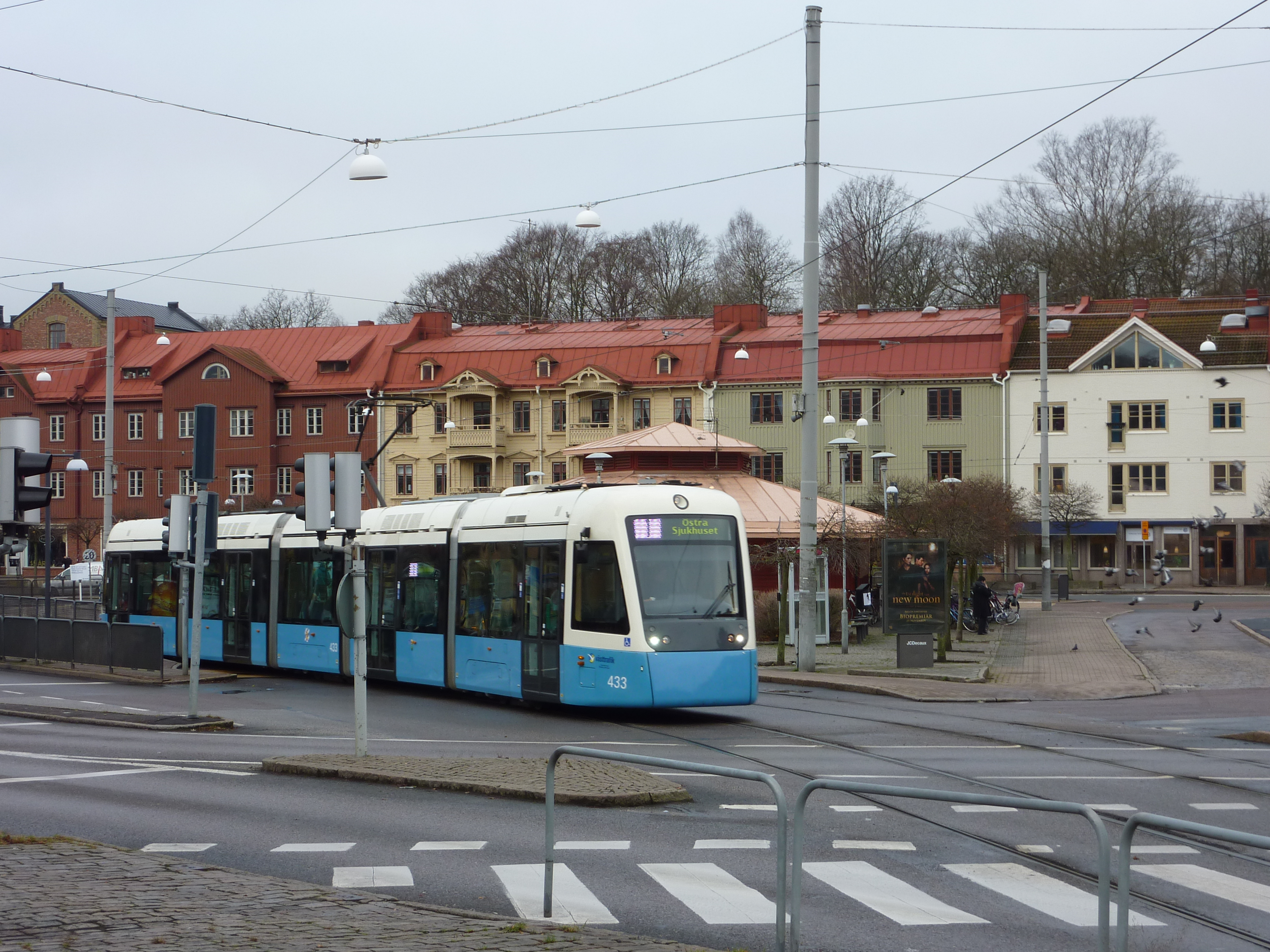
An M32 at Redbergsplatsen, November 2009. The traditional landshövdingehus can be seen in the background.

Since 2010, the previously used magnetic stripe cards have been replaced with RFID cards. Ticket machines taking coins and credit cards have also been installed on the trams, along with a text message system where tickets may be purchased with mobile phones. From about 2019, a phone app has become the leading mode of ticket purchase.

In December 2025, a new tramway route to Lindholmen, Hisingen, opened. This extension was the latest of the tram network since 2002. Several tram stops were simultaneously closed so that the newer, longer tram carts could operate.

=== Ticket system ===
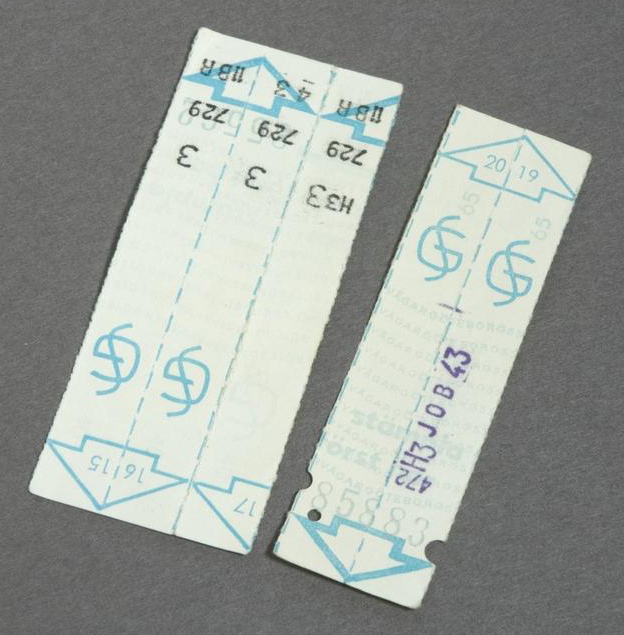
Old tickets for the Gotheburg tramway. The tickets were stamped by the passenger.

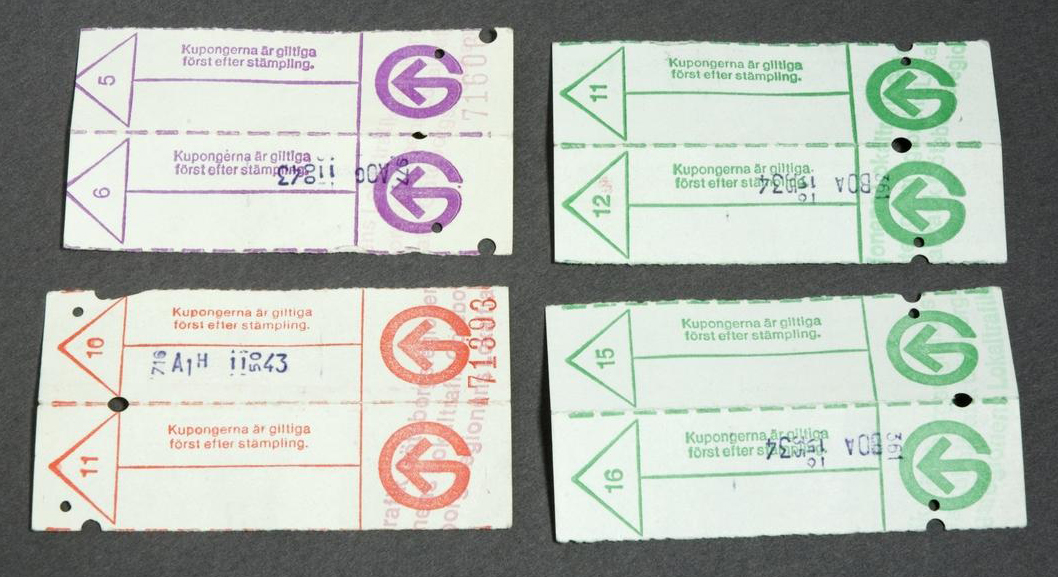
Tickets for the Gothenburg tramway. The tickets were stamped by the passenger.

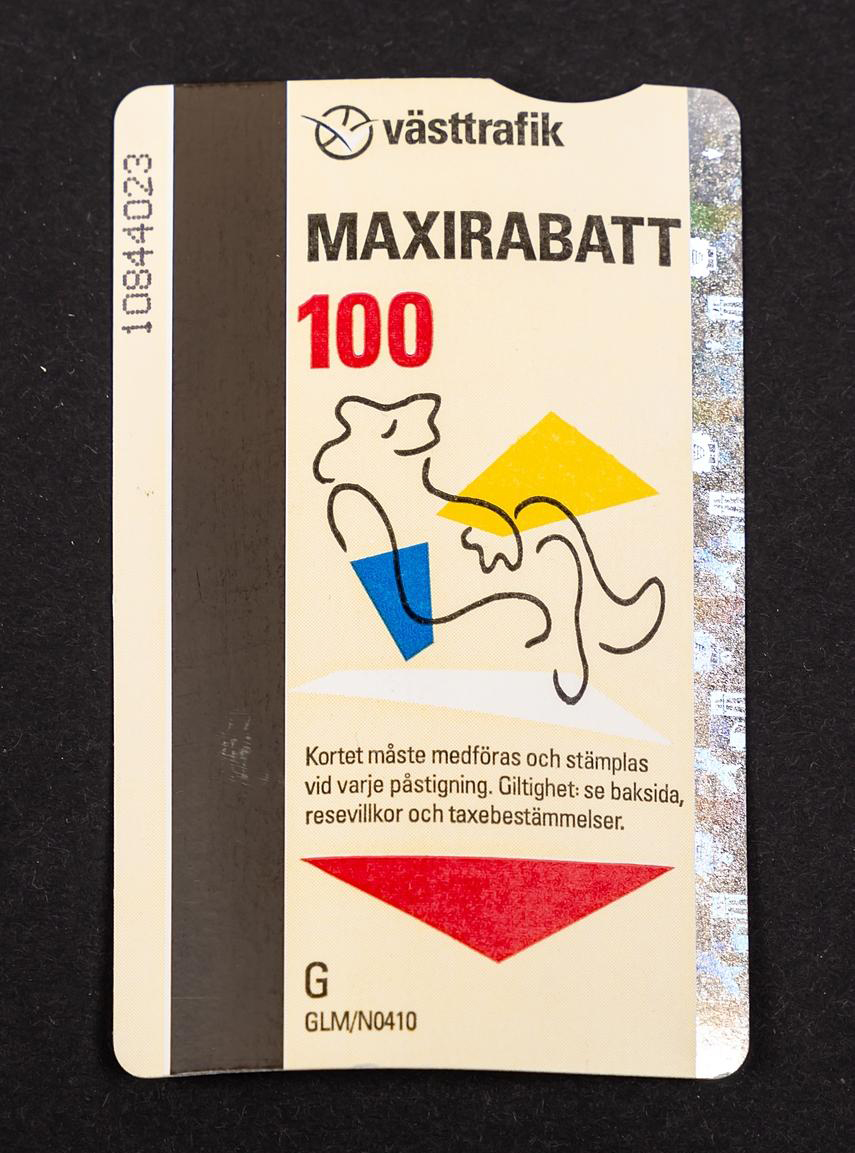
A ticket with a magnetic strip from Västtrafik.

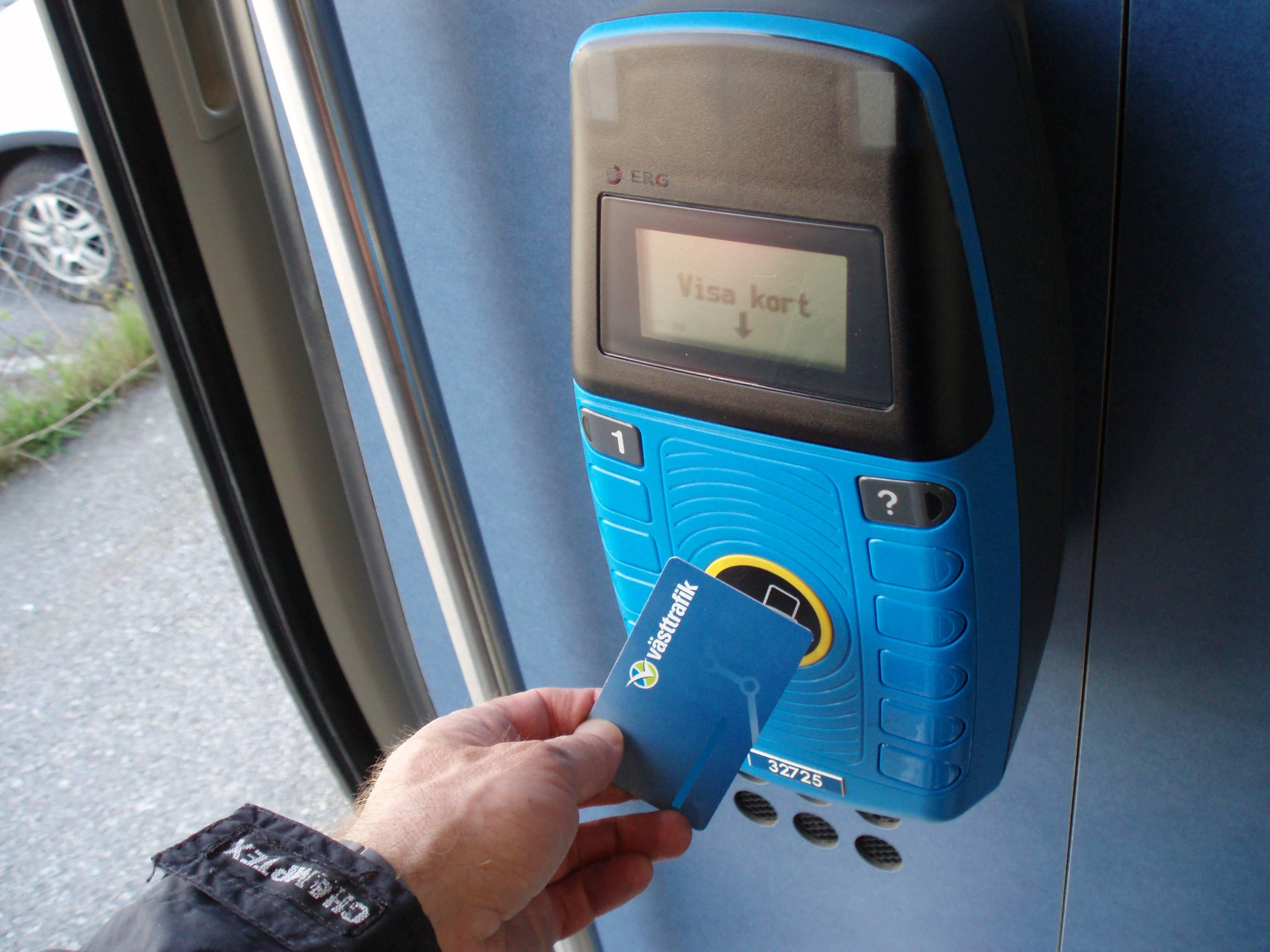
Showing a ticket card to a card reader in a Västtrafik vehicle.

Already on the first tram line in Gothenburg in 1879, Brunnsparken - Redbergslid, there was a ticket system or in other words, a receipt for the tram trip. This was in the form of a strip of paper with a letter, the text "Göteborgs spårvägar" ("Gothenburg tramway"), "10 öre" and a group of numbers. This type of ticket was in use up to 1900 when a "transfer ticket" was introduced. When the electric tramway was taken into use in 1902 there was a new type of ticket system, where there were separate rules on some tram routes. In 1911 the transfer tickets were equipped with a map of the city tramway network. Passengers drew a line on the route map signifying where they wanted to transfer to. This type of ticket was in used until 1921 when it was replaced with a ticket with four columns, of which the first column was for omnibus lines, the second for times of day, the third for the date and the fourth for the tramway lines. This type of ticket was in use at least until 1941. Until 1920 there were separate tickets for so-called worker trams, a booklet with five-öre tickets that were valid for tram trips started before 8 in the morning. There were also discount cards and season cards in use from early on. Before 1921 the tickets were paid by putting money in a payment bag. When these bags had disappeared passengers got a receipt for all payments, but had to signify where they wanted to transfer - otherwise the thumb was placed on the lower left corner of the ticket which then became invalid.

In 1952 the ticket prices were as follows: "Basic price for adult passengers, 30 öre. Basic price for children who are at least 4 years but less than 14 years old, 15 öre. On lines 4, 9, 44, 45, 47, 52 and 53 there are surplus fares for going over the fare boundary, at 15 öre for adult passengers and 10 öre for children at least 4 years but less than 14 years old. On line 41 there are surplus fares for going over the fare boundary, at 20 öre for adult passengers and 15 öre for children at least 4 years but less than 14 years old. At night-time traffic the basic ticket prices are double that of the day-time traffic, for adults and children respectively. At night-time traffic the surplus fares are double that of the day-time traffic. For dogs the ticket price is the same as for adult passengers. For baby prams the ticket price is the same as for children. For for-pay packages the ticket price is the same as for adult passengers."

The journey-based price system was replaced with a price system based on individual tracks in 1956, in other words the price of a tram journey was based on its length. Cards for school students were introduced in autumn 1953, monthly tickets in 1961 and weekly tickets in 1962. The fares for trams and buses in Gothenburg as of 1 December 1966 were as follows: booklets à 10 krona (41 tickets), booklets à 5 krona (17 tickets), individual tickets à 40 öre, weekly tickets 15 krona, monthly tickets 55 krona.

A new ticket system with self-service on trailer trams was introduced on 2 June 1967 on the tramway lines 1 and 3 as well as some bus lines. This system means that passengers buy their tickets in advance and stamp them in a machine. The requirement was that passengers should have a card, a ticket or a transfer ticket. At the same time (1 June) stamping of tickets during transfer was stopped, which meant that passengers only needed to stamp their tickets at the start of the ongoing journey and at the start of the return journey. Before this, the tickets were stamped by the driver of the conductor. The 550 ticket machines (called "bm", short for "biljetteringmaskiner" in Swedish) were delivered by the French company Société de Construction d'Appareils Mécaniques Precision from Paris. The machines were first installed as a test on the bus line 84 on 4 April and on the tram lines 2, 3, 4, 5 and 7 on 17 April. On 2 May the system was installed on all tram lines which meant that the tramway no longer needed conductors.

In 1973 a zone-based system with two zones was introduced, consisting of an inner zone (municipality of Gothenburg) and an outer zone. The cost was handled with tickets. On 1 January 1973 three types of monthly tickets were introduced, one that included Gothenburg municipality, one that included the entire travel area and a special yearly ticket for pensioners. Weekly tickets were discontinued at the same time. On 1 June 1977 a unified fare system within the Gothenburg region was introduced, consisting of the municipalities of Gothenburg, Mölndal, Partille and Öckerö. In these municipalities the unified fare system was partly implemented with a regional fare for the entire area and partly with a municipal fare for each individual municipality.

Later in the 1980s a new ticket system was introduced, as a joint operation by the Gothenburg region local traffic and Bohustrafiken. These tickets had a magnetic stripe and the cost and saldo were written on the tickets. In 2006 Västtrafik introduced a new ticket system, where passengers only had to show their ticket to a ticket reader machine, which would then only display the remaining saldo on the ticket.

=== Tramway directors ===
- 1900 - 1900: Figge Blidberg
- 1900 - 1903: J. Sigfrid Edström
- 1903 - 1919: Erland Zell
- 1920 - 1920: Gotthard Dieben
- 1921 - 1926: Ivar Wendt
- 1927 - 1943: Carl Axel Reuterswärd
- 1943 - 1952: Thure Vidlund
- 1952 - 1970: Sixten Camp
- 1970 - 1982: Ivan Arnér
- 1982 - 1990: Curt M. Elmberg

== Network overview ==
Most tram lines pass through Brunnsparken, which is effectively the central hub of public transport in Gothenburg. The exceptions are Lines 8 and 12. The Central Station is also a major stop, especially because it is the nearest stop not only for train passengers but also passengers coming from the neighbouring Nils Ericson Terminal, where coaches, airport buses to Landvetter Airport and regional buses stop. Korsvägen is another major stop, where Line 6 and Line 8 meet lines going into the city centre and out to Mölndal. Most tram lines are on the south side of the river, but Line 2, Line 5, Line 6, Line 10 and Line 12 cross Hisingsbron to the north side.

Line	Route	Length	Stops
Line 1 (Gothenburg Tramway)	Tynnered – Östra Sjukhuset	15.6 km (9.7 mi)	28
Line 2 (Gothenburg Tramway)	Högsbotorp – Biskopsgården (via Nordstan)	13.3 km (8.3 mi)	27
Line 3 (Gothenburg Tramway)	Marklandsgatan – Kålltorp	12.7 km (7.9 mi)	29
Line 4 (Gothenburg Tramway)	Mölndal – Angered	19.3 km (12.0 mi)	21
Line 5 (Gothenburg Tramway)	Östra Sjukhuset – Länsmansgården	13.8 km (8.6 mi)	33
Line 6 (Gothenburg Tramway)	Kortedala – Länsmansgården (via Sahlgrenska)	24.6 km (15.3 mi)	46
Line 7 (Gothenburg Tramway)	Tynnered – Bergsjön	21.1 km (13.1 mi)	35
Line 8 (Gothenburg Tramway)	Frölunda – Angered	21.3 km (13.2 mi)	25
Line 9 (Gothenburg Tramway)	Kungssten – Angered	20.6 km (12.8 mi)	21
Line 10 (Gothenburg Tramway)	Guldheden – Lindholmen	7.2 km (4.5 mi)	13
Line 11 (Gothenburg Tramway)	Saltholmen – Bergsjön	21.8 km (13.5 mi)	35
Line 12 (Gothenburg Tramway)	Lindholmen – Mölndal	10.3 km (6.4 mi)	18
Line 13 (Gothenburg Tramway)	Saltholmen - Gothenburg Central Station	7.9 km (4.9 mi)	13
Line 14 (Gothenburg Tramway)	The line was in use for the first time between 2003 and 2006, it had the route from the Gothenburg Central Station to Krokslätt. In summer 2015 the line was taken again into use temporarily and was lengthened to Länsmansgården via Nordstan because of tram track repairs. The line also appeared for a time in summer 2020 and went to the centre of Mölndal and Linnéplatsen, and was later lengthened to the depot at Majorna. In February 2021 the line was taken into use again, to lessen the congestion during the COVID-19 pandemic. In late October 2021 all traffic on line 14 was ended because of lack of available trams.		
Line X (Gothenburg Tramway)	A line used for times of high traffic. Used for trams going to the depot, as well as for trams replacing other tram lines under tram track repairs.		
	Gothenburg Central Station - Liseberg - Sankt Sigfrids Plan / Lana	3.5 km (2.2 mi)	8

== Rolling stock ==
The types of tramcars currently running in Gothenburg are:

Image	Name	Notes
	M29	It was manufactured by Hägglund & Söner in Örnsköldsvik and delivered between 1969 and 1972. Numbered 801–860. Each tramcar weighs circa 17 tonnes, is 14.16 metres long, and has the capacity of 38 seated and 88 standing. It has a Bo'Bo' wheel arrangement, and normally operates in duo-unit. Currently, 51 vehicles are in use. It will be decommissioned on 1 June 2026.
	M31	Being the reconstructed version of the M21, it was rebuilt by Mittenwalder Gerätebau GmbH in Germany. It was delivered between 1998 and 2002. The new model was articulated with low floor intermediate. Numbered 301–380. The tram weighs 34.5 tonnes, is 30.66 metres long, and has the capacity of 77 seating and 111 standing. It has a Bo'+1'1'+Bo' wheel arrangement. Currently, 80 vehicles are in use. It will be decommissioned 15 years after its revision (estimated circa 2038–2042).
	M32	It was manufactured by AnsaldoBreda in Italy and delivered between 2004 and 2013. Numbered 401–465. The tram weighs 39.8 tonnes, is 29.55 metres long, and has the capacity of 82 seating and 104 standing. It has a Bo'+0+2'+0+Bo' wheel arrangement. Currently, 62 vehicles are in use. It will be decommissioned 20 years after its delivery (estimated circa 2025–2033).
	M33	It was manufactured by Alstom in Germany and delivered between 2020 and 2023. The unidirectional (M33A) and bidirectional (M33B) version is numbered 490–499 and 500–530 respectively. The tram weighs circa 40 tonnes, is circa 33 metres long, and has the capacity of 75 seating and 155 standing. It has a Bo'+2'2'+Bo' wheel arrangement. Currently, 30 unidirectional and 10 bidirectional vehicles are in use. It will be decommissioned 30 years after its delivery (estimated circa 2050s).
	M34	Being the longer version of the M33 (M33C), it is manufactured by Alstom in Germany and will be delivered between 2025 and 2027. Numbered 601–660. The tram weighs circa 67 tonnes, is circa 45 metres long, and has the capacity of 303 people. It has a Bo'Bo'+0+2'2'+0+Bo'Bo' wheel arrangement. Currently, 60 vehicles are ordered and 14 are in use.

In 2013 work with deciding new tram stocks began. By April 2016, it was announced that a minimum 40 trams of the new model M33 had been ordered from Bombardier Transportation Sweden AB/Vossloh Kiepe GmbH for delivery by year 2019. In 2022, Västtrafik ordered 40 more trams of the same model, an order that was later expanded to 60, to be designated M34. They were first put in service on 19 January 2025. When all M33 and M34 trams are delivered in 2026, the old M29 trams still in service will be decommissioned.

There is a fleet of heritage trams used in the network. One of the oldest trams, M1 15, which was built in 1902, is preserved in operational condition.

=== Older tram types ===
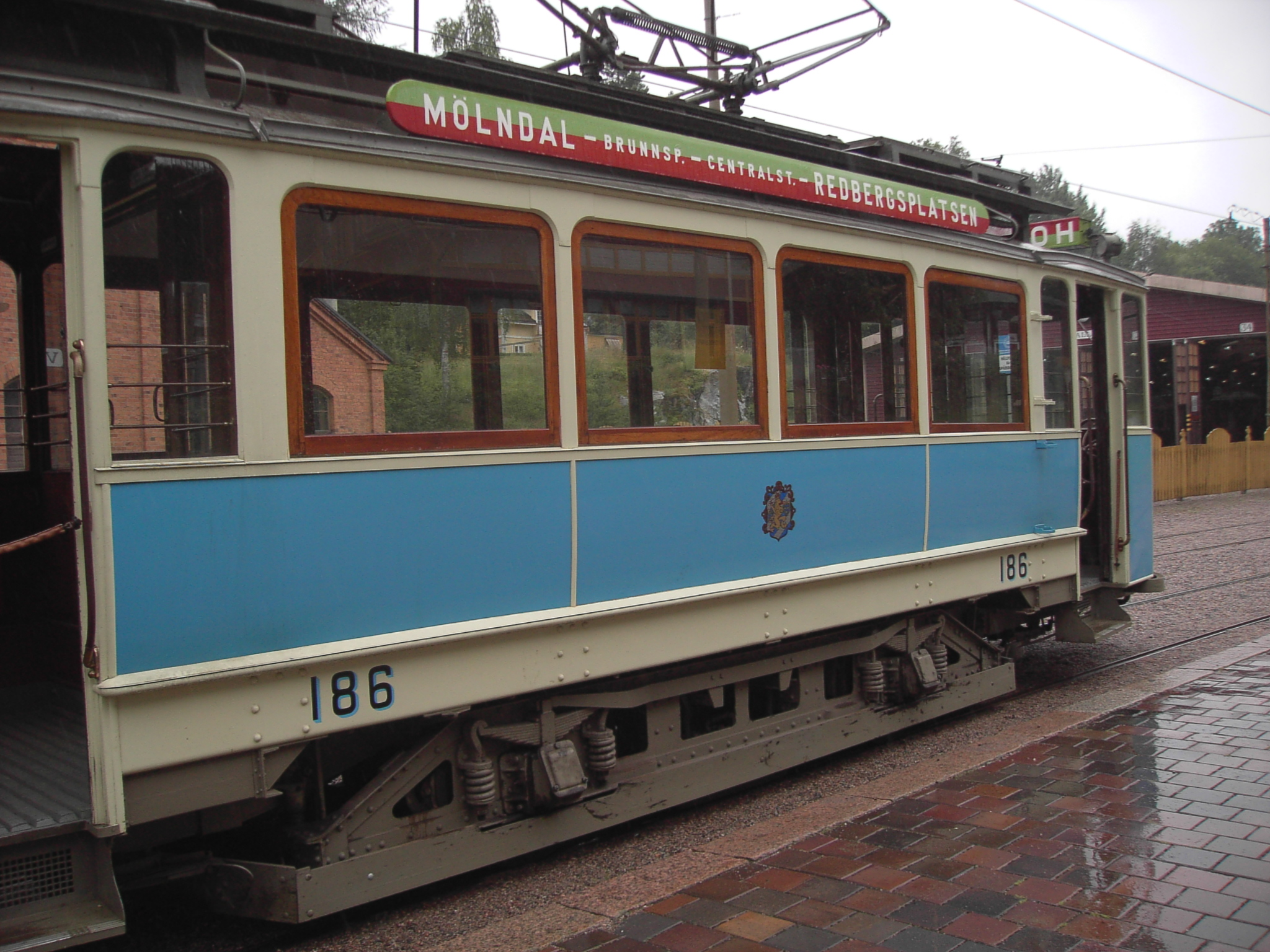
A tram of type GS M9, built in 1930.

M22 (Mb03) was built by Asea from 1943 to 1944 and M23 (Mb04 / Mb05) was built by Hägglunds from 1948 to 1952. These types of trams are often called Mustangs. 15 trams of the type M22 were delivered, numbered 211 through 225. All 15 trams were rebuilt in a M23-like fashion in Eksjö from 1951 to 1952. None of the trams were rebuilt to accommodate right-hand traffic, and so the trams were taken out of use on 2 September 1967. Only three of the trams remained: tram 211 is now at the Ringlinien tramway society, tram 224 is at the Swedish Tramway Society in Malmköping, and tram 225 was used as a service tram for the Angeredsbanan line but was since scrapped in 1986. The M23 tram series consisted of 63 trams, of which trams 1 through 35 were of a lighter type than trams 36 to 60. The lighter trams were never very popular and in 1951 they were replaced with heavier trams. Two of the trams were equipped with pedal controls before the experiment with the new tram type M25 but were since restored to their original condition. 18 Mustang-type trams remain, in Gothenburg, Stockholm, Malmköping and Oslo.

M25 trams were built by Hägglunds from 1958 to 1962, originally 125 trams in total (trams 501 to 625). The outer appearance of the trams was different from Mustang-type trams, M25 trams are a bit longer (15.1 metres compared to 13.0 metres of M23 trams and M22 trams). 36 of the M25-type trams were bought by Oslo Sporveier from 1991 to 1994 and were labelled as SM91. These trams were taken out of service in 2002, partly because of a change in the line current and partly of numerous accidents, in particular a deadly accident where a person was caught in a door and dragged inside the tram. In Gothenburg the M25 trams were taken out of service in 1994 because of newer trams taken into service. Some of the M25 trams were never rebuilt to accommodate right-hand traffic because they were transferred to the Angeredsbanan line instead, which lacked balloon loops and was therefore necessary to build as a bidirectional tramway. When balloon loops were built the left-hand traffic trams were no longer necessary and thus nearly all of them were scrapped, with the exception of one tram that was sold to the Swedish Tramway Society in Gothenburg, which also owns two right-hand traffic trams.

The first covered tram was taken into use in middle November 1895 and was built in Sweden, by the metalsmith company Gullbrandsen in Gothenburg. The tram had a somewhat wider build and was taller.

Trams were equipped with heating devices since 1 January 1896.

== History of tram lines ==
=== Horse-drawn tramway lines ===
The first tram line in Gothenburg was opened between Brunnsparken and Stigsbergsliden on 24 September 1879 with four trams. The lines Brunnsparken - Redbergslid and Brunnsparken - Getebergsgäng were opened on 16 December 1880. The fourth and final line between Brunnsparken and Slottsskogen was opened on 5 October 1882. In autumn 1885 this line was redesigned when the Viktoriabron bridge was built. At this time the line network was as follows:

Horse-drawn tramway from 1885 to 1902
Brunnsparken - Södra Hamngatan - Västra Hamngatan - Sahlgrensgatan - Rosenlundsbron - Sprängkullsgatan - Södra Allén - Andra Långgatan - Stigbergsliden (Johannesplatsen)
Brunnsparken - Södra Hamngatan - Hotellplatsen - Drottningtorget - Stampgatan - Svingeln - Redbergslid (Olskrokstorget)
Brunnsparken - Östra Hamngatan - Kungsportsavenyen - Engelbrektsgatan - Södra Vägen - Getebergsäng
Brunnsparken - Södra Hamngatan - Västra Hamngatan - Sahlgrensgatan - Viktoriabron - Viktoriagatan - Vasagatan - Sprängkullsgatan - Övre Husargatan - Slottsskogen (Linnéplatsen)

The Slottsskog line originally went from Rosenlundsbron via Sprängkullsgatan and Parkgatan to Viktoriagatan.

The horse-drawn tramway differed from the current electric tramway at the following points:

- Andra Långgatan instead of Första Långgatan.
- Rosenlundsbron.
- Sahlgrensgatan (the horse-drawn tramway went between the current Lärarhögskolan and Vallgraven stops).
- Sprängkullsgatan - Över Husargatan.

=== First electric tramway 1902 ===
On 28 July 1902 at 03:30 in the morning tram number 28 drove out of the depot at Järntorget for the first test run with the electric tramway on the line Järntorget - Slottsskogsgatan. On Monday 18 August the line Järntorget - Slottsskogsgatan (Majorna) was opened for public traffic, the line was 2.9 km long and trams departed every 10 minutes. The newspaper Ny Tid described this as:

"Already at half past six there was a large crowd at the Slottsskogsgatan terminus who wanted to witness this important event. The day was celebrated at the depot in Majorna. Finally the doors were opened and tram number 1 rolled out on the line and there was a rush of people wanting to come along on the first tide. The tram finally starts moving and there was a shot 'Long live the first tram, hipp hipp hurra-a'. After a ride of thirteen minutes the tram reaches its destination at Järntorget, where there also was a large crowd of people."

On the first days the trams departed every 10 minutes, but on 21 August this changed to every 5 minutes with six motor-driven trams. On the first day, 7,456 people rode on the electric trams, on the day after that there were 5,152 people. At the end of the month 106,172 people have ridden on the electric tram on the line between Järntorget and Majorna. The fare for the electric tram was 10 öre.

On 25 August the line to Slottsskogen via Västergatan started. Immediately after 14 o'clock in the afternoon on 27 October in the same year the line to Drottningtorget was officially opened. It had ten trams, which were decorated with blue-yellow stripes, drove in two rows and were filled with about 200 invited guests.

The first line network was as follows:

Line	Route
RINGLINIEN	LILLA BOMMEN - Nils Ericsonsplatsen - Centralstationen - Brunnsparken - Valand - Vasagatan - Viktoriagatan - Parkgatan - Järntorget - Linnégatan - SLOTTSSKOGEN (Linnéplatsen) - Västergatan (Annedal) - Vasagatan - Viktoriagatan - Viktoriabron - Södra Larmgatan - Västra Hamngatan - Kämpebron - Packhusplatsen - LILLA BOMMEN [The route was in the form of the digit 8. Traffic was in both directions.]
	MAJORNA (Karl Johansgatan/Slottsskogsgatan) - Karl Johansgatan - Första Långgatan - Järntorget - Parkgatan - Viktoriabron - Södra Larmgatan - Västra Hamngatan - Brunnsparken - Centralstationen - Stampgatan - Svingeln - REDBERGSLID (Olskrokstorget)
	MAJORNA (Karl Johansgatan/Slottsskogsgatan) - [the same route as the blue line] - Brunnsparken - Kungsportsavenyen - Engelbrektsgatan - Södra vägen - GETEBERGSÄNG
	REDBERGSLID (Olskrokstorget) - [the same route as the blue and green lines] - GETEBERGSÄNG

The blue and red lines were extended to Rebergsplatsen in 1904.

=== First times of electric tramway (1902 to 1907) ===
During the following years the electric tramway grew quickly.

The Änggårdslinjen line was opened in 1903 up to the Säröbanan station, and on 1 January 1904 it was extended to Sahlgrenska Norra:

ÄNGGÅRDSLINIEN	SLOTTSSKOGEN (Linnéplatsen) - ÄNGGÅRDEN (Sahlgrenska Norra)

It was later extended to Drottningstorget.

On 29 October 1905 a new line was opened to the Kviberg barracks. On 1 February 1906 a new auxiliary track to the Slakthuset house in the Gothenburg old town was opened, which was used for transport of meat. On 2 July 1906 the line was extended to Drottningstorget:

KVIBERGSLINIEN	DROTTNINGTORGET - Stampgatan - Olskrokstorget - Riddaregatan - Storkgatan - Ånäsvägen - level crossing with Västra Stambanan - Gamlestadsvägen - Artillerigatan - Kvibergsvägen KVIBERG (Kviberg barracks)

On 14 August 1907 a new line was opened from Drottningstorget via Getebergsgång to Mölndal. The line was marked with a green/red colour to mark it as an extension of the red and green lines up to Mölndal.

On 21 September 1907 the Långedragslinjen line was opened from Järntorget to Hinsholmen. In December it was extended to Långedrag.

In the same year line numbers were introduced. The Ringlinjen line got the number 1 in one direction and 2 in the other.

The tramway network now consisted of 10 lines and was as follows:

The line network in autumn 1907
Line	Route
1	LILLA BOMMEN - Nils Ericsonsplatsen - Centralstationen - Brunnsparken - Valand - Vasagatan - Viktoriagatan - Parkgatan - Järntorget - Linnégatan - SLOTTSSKOGEN (Linnéplatsen) - Västergatan (Annedal) - Vasagatan - Viktoriagatan - Viktoriabron - Södra Larmgatan - Västra Hamngatan - Kämpebron - Packhusplatsen - LILLA BOMMEN [The upper part of the digit 8 clockwise, the lower part counterclockwise.]
2	LILLA BOMMEN - SLOTTSSKOGEN [Opposite direction.]
3	MAJORNA - REDBERGSLID (Redbergsplatsen)
4	MAJORNA - GETEBERGSÄNG
5	REDBERGSLID (Redbergsplatsen) - GETEBERGSÄNG
6	DROTTNINGTORGET - ÄNGGÅRDEN
7	DROTTNINGTORGET - KVIBERG
8*	DROTTNINGTORGET - Kungsportsavenyen - Getebergsäng - MÖLNDAL
9**	JÄRNTORGET - Karl Johansgatan - Långedragsvägen - LÅNGEDRAG
10***	GÅRDA (Lilla Stampgatan) - [the same route as line 3] - BANGATAN (Bangatan/Åsgatan)

* The line had signs split diagonally. The upper left part was green, the lower right part was red. ** The text was in white letters with black shadows. *** The line had a blue horizontal line over the text and another under it. The line was called "Lilla Blå" ("the little blue one") and was an auxiliary line for the blue line.

On 5 April 1908 the Långedragslinjen line was extended to Saltholmen.

=== Development from 1908 to 1950 ===
From 1908 to 1950 the Gothenburg tramway network was not expanded very much. With some exceptions, the track between Korsvägen and Sankt Sigfridsplan was opened in 1929. In 1936 the tram track was extended from Härlanda to Kålltorp and in 1939 the Götaälvbron bridge was built with a tramway, the line was built from Hisingen to Hjalmar Brantingsplatsen in 1940, and from there to Gropegårdsgatan (Lundby Egnahem) in 1944.

=== Development after 1950 ===
Since the 1950s the tramway network was expanded to the suburbs, at the same time when they were developed. The lines were built to:

- Länsmansgården where the line to Hisingen was expanded to. Lines 2 and 5.
- Kortedala, and from there to Bergsjön. The line 7 was extended afterwards and still goes to Bergsjön. The line between Sahlgrenska and Kortedala was opened on 20 May 1957.
- Tynnered. The line number has varied. Many lines have turned onto the track from various places. On 16 March 1964 the last part of the tramway to Västra Frölunda was completed, with the 2,600-metre long double track tramway between Axel Dahlströms Torg and Frölunda Torg. From the 1960s to the late 1980s the line 2 went to Tynnered. After the track Botaniska-Sahlgrenska was built in 1989 the line 7 went via Sahlgrenska to Tynnered.
- Angered, the line was partially built in 1968 and completed in 1979. The line had the number 8 for a long time, and afterwards various numbers.
- Östra sjukhuset, the line was built in 1982.

The track from Lilla Bommen via Sankt Eriksgatan to Lilla Target was rebuilt in 1971 to Östra Hamngatan to make room for the Götaleden highway.

In the 1970s and at the start of the 1980s the line 4 (which went between Mölndal and Saltholmen via Brunnsparken) was replaced at evening time with line 10 which also went between Mölndal and Saltholmen but via Vasagatan instead of Brunnsparken. The line 10 had a blue/yellow colour with diagonally split signs.

The current route of line 6 is from the 2000s. It was opened when a new tramway was built, from Linnéplatsen to the Sahlgrenska University Hospital, along with Chalmerstunneln (built in 2002) and the track on Skånegatan (built in 2003). The line takes the form of a curve around central Gothenburg, and before this the line 6 went between Guldheden and Kortedala via Brunnsparken.

The connection from Linnéplatsen to Sahlgrenska goes mostly along the same route as the old line 6 or the Änggårdslinjen line (single track) which was discontinued in 1948, when the current line via Landala and Guldheden was built.

From September 2003 to August 2006 there was a line 14 between Krokslätt (tramway stop Lana) and the Gothenburg Central Station, but this was replaced with the line 2 when it was reopened.

As part of the Project Kringen a new travel centre called Stenpiren was built on the Skeppsbron bridge in August 2015. This travel centre connects Lilla Torget with Järntorget and is called Badhuslänken when the new tracks mostly go along Stora Badhusgatan. This allows for short travel times from western Gothenburg to Brunnsparken and the Gothenburg Central Station.

== Discontinued lines and routes ==
There have been only two actual discontinuations of parts of the tramway network, not counting the short-lived cargo transport tramway to the butchery. These two consist of the Änggårdslinjen line (later rebuilt) and the Bräckelinjen line. Some more or less effective changes to the tramway network have still been made, as described below.

- The longest discontinued line is the Bräckelinjen in Hissingen, which was discontinued in 1968 and dismantled in the 1970s. The line went from Eketrägatan to the southwest and had four stops. A short part of the line remains and is used as a test and practice track.
- A little shorter line went between Linnéplatsen and Sahlgrenska, Änggårdslinjen (called "Blindtarmen", Swedish for "cecum"). It was a single-track line and was discontinued in 1948, when the current line via Landala and Guldheden was built. It was rebuilt in 1989 with a partly new route.
- The track from Lilla Bommen via Sankt Eriksgatan to Lilla Torget was rebuilt in 1971 to Östra Hamngatan to make room for the Götaleden highway.
- The terminus of the Mölndalslinjen line used to be located a couple hundred metres further south until the 1960s. In the 2000s it was further shortened so that passengers no longer could remain on the trams at the turning loop at the end of the track.
- The Kvibergslinjen cargo tram line to Slakthuset in the Old Town was discontinued only a short time after its opening. There was even passenger traffic at the intersection with the Bergslagsbanan line.
- The terminus of Kvibergslinjen near the Kviberg barracks was discontinued when the line was extended to Kortedala in 1956. A new terminus named Kviberg was built about 250 metres further north and about 200 metres of track was dismantled and moved to the route to Kortedala.
- The Kvibergslinjen line (now called Bergsjölinjen) previously went to Riddaregatan and (northern) Ånäsvägen. It was moved from (northern) Ånäsvägen to Gamlestadsvägen in 1921, from Riddaregatan to (southern) Ånäsvägen in 1964, finally from Gamlestadsvägen to the west of the Old Town factories in 1972.

== Discontinued stops ==
- Alelyckan on the Angeredslinjen line was the terminus and feeding bus station before the stations of Hjällbo, Hammarkullen and Storås were completed.
- Amiralitetsgatan between Stigbergstorget and Fjällgatan.
- Berga between Käringberget and Tranered.
- Cederbourgsgatan between Korsvägen and Liseberg Södra (at that time called Getebergsgäng) was discontinued in 1978.
- Dahlströmsgatan between Fjällgatan and Majvallen.
- Djupedal and Platagegatan were combined into Prinsgatan in the 1980s.
- Fricksgatan between Wavrinskys plats and Medicinaregatan was discontinued in the 1980s.
- Föreningsgatan between Handelshögskolan (at that time called Haga Kyrkoplan) and Brunnsgatan on line 2 was discontinued in the 1980s.
- Johannesplatsen between Masthuggstorget and Stigberstorget in the 1960s.
- Karl Johans Kyrka between Kaptensgatan and Chapmans Torg was discontinued in the late 1980s. At the same time the stop at Kaptensgatan was moved slightly to the west.
- Kålltorp, Torp and Virginsgatan were originally three separate stops at a stretch of 200 metres. Virginsgatan was the first to be discontinued, but the name was later reused on the unified stops Kålltorp and Torp which were moved to the original location for Virginsgatan.
- Lilla Torget between Brunnsparken and Domkyrkan was discontinued in the late 1980s.
- Lorensberg between Valand and Berzeliigatan was discontinued in 1979.
- Orgelgatan between Musikvägen and Frölunda Torg was discontinued along with the renovation of the stop at Frölunda torg in 2008. The stop was replaced with the new stop Positivgatan.
- Polhemsplatsen (Centralstationen) was the name for the terminus of the Angeredslinjen line between 1969 and 1979.
- Sahlgrenska Norra at the terminus loop was discontinued when the route between Botaniska and Sahlgrenska was opened in the late 1980s. It was the turning point for line 7 before this. The terminus loop is now used for line 13 but there is no longer a stop there.
- Skolgatan and Park Viktoriagatan were discontinued in the 1980s. The stops were replaced with the new stop Hagakyrkan.
- Slottsskogsvallen between Marklandsgatan and Botaniska trädgården was discontinued in the 1990s because of too few passengers.
- Stampbron between Gothenburg Central Station and Ullevi Norra (at that time called Ullevi).
- Stampsgatan was combined with Svingeln.
- Stora Teatern between Kungsportsplatsen and Valand was discontinued in the 1940s.
- Storgatan was combined with Vasaplatsen.
- Sundshagsgatan between Majvallen and Ekedal was discontinued in 1978. Sundhagsgatan was present in the city plan and would have stretched straight through the Ekedalskoloni area to Ekedalsgatan but was never extended that far (the street ended about 400 metres before the stop).
- Tempelgatan between Mölndals Sjukhus (at that time called Centrallasarettet) and Mölndal city centre (at that time called Broplatsen).
- Vasa Kyrkogatan between Vasaplatsen and Kapellplatsen (at that time called Vasa sjukhus) was discontinued in the 1980s. It was the last stop where embarking and disembarking of passengers was over the motor vehicle street.
- Värmlandsgatan between Järntorget and Masthuggstorget was discontinued when the stop at Masthuggstorget was moved to the east.
- The stop previously named Wieselgrensgatan between Stockholmsgatan and Härlanda, the new city plan included a street at Hisingen instead, the stop at Härlanda was moved slightly to the west in the 1930s.
- Älvsborgsplan between Ostindiegatan, Mariaplan and Sannaplan. Discontinued in 1980s. The stop was merged with Mariaplan, which was moved to its current position.
- A stop originally called Änggårdsplatsen but renamed Botaniska trädgården south of Linnéplatsen was discontinued in the late 1980s along with the renovation of the route between Sahlgrenska and Frölundaborg. The stop to the south called Storängsgatan was renamed to Botaniska trädgården. The botanical garden itself is located between the two stops.
- Roddföreningen, the reason for the discontinuation of the stop was that it was too short for the new M34 trams which were first tested on lines 5 and 11 (the line 11 stopped at the stop). Other reasons included too few passengers at the stop and the stop being located too near the stops at Långedrag and Saltholmen.

== Depots ==
The depots in Gothenburg are:

- Ringön Depot (RÖX) in the Tingstadsvassen district, opened at the beginning of June 2020, space for approx. 100 trams in full build-out.
- Majorna Depot (MX) is the oldest depot, opened in 1921, space for approx. 70 trams, all M28 vehicles are stationed here in 2025.
- Rantorget Depot (RTX), former name Gårda Depot, opened in 1985, there is a car park on the roof of the depot.
- Slottsskogen Depot (SLX), belonged to Säröbanan, which was shut down in 1965, used as a tram depot from 2012; the open spaces were cleared in 2025, space for 48 15-metre trams or 24 30-metre-long trams.
- Gårda Depot (GX), built in 1930, eight tracks, length approx. 90 metres, home to the Gothenburg Tram Museum since 2011.

== Accidents ==
- On the morning of 12 March 1992, a major tram accident occurred at Vasaplatsen, killing 13 people and injuring 46 others.
- In the evening of 19 June 2025, a tram crashed into a snack bar, injuring several people, including the driver.

== See also ==
- Stockholm Metro
