= Järntorget =

Järntorget (Swedish: "Iron Square") is a common name for public squares in Swedish cities, the two most well-known being:

- Järntorget (Stockholm)
- Järntorget (Göteborg)
