= List of tram accidents =

This is a worldwide list of accidents involving trams (or streetcars in U.S. English) in which there was significant damage to the tramcar or involving severe injury or death to those in the tramcar. Pedestrian fatalities are outside the scope of this list.

== Argentina ==
- On 12 July 1930, an electric tram no. 75 on Line 105 travelling from Temperley to Lanús in Greater Buenos Aires, Argentina, plunged into the Matanza River when the driver attempted to cross the Bosch Bridge without realising that the central bascule was raised. 56 out of 60 passengers died and only 4 survived, making this the deadliest tram accident anywhere in the world.

== Australia ==
- On 15 January 1864, well-known Anglo-Australian musician and composer Isaac Nathan was hit and killed by a Sydney horse tram when his clothing was caught in the door, whilst he was attempting to alight. Nathan is reputed to be one of the first tram fatalities in the Southern Hemisphere (many sources claim that it was the first such accident).
- On 28 September 1913, a Rockhampton steam tram and its trailer capsized on a sharp bend while returning from the Rockhampton Botanic Gardens resulting in three fatalities. One man died instantly, while two women later died from their injuries in hospital.
- On 21 August 1924, a coupled set of Sydney tram E-class cars ran out of control near McMahon's Point, derailed and crashed into a house. There were two fatalities, and the trams were extensively damaged.
- On 22 May 2017, a Melbourne tram was hit by a truck in Parkville, hospitalising 14.

== Austria ==
- On 2 August 1960, a tram ran away in Vienna, Austria and collided with another at a crossroads. Eighteen people were killed and 104 were injured.
- On 21 April 2015, twelve people were injured after two trams collided in Vienna.

== Bosnia and Herzegovina ==
- On 12 February 2026, a tram derailed in Sarajevo, killing one and injuring four.

== Brazil ==
- On 27 August 2011, a Santa Teresa Tram in Rio de Janeiro, Brazil derailed, killing six people and injuring at least fifty.

== Canada ==
- On 26 May 1896, in Victoria, British Columbia, Canada, a Consolidated Electric Railway Company tram car carrying 143 people plunged into a harbour after the bridge it was crossing collapsed. The disaster killed 55 people and left an unknown number of others injured.
- On 7 July 1915, a severely overloaded Niagara Falls Park and River Railway open-sided car went out of control while descending the Niagara Escarpment near Queenston, Ontario. Fifteen people died, and many others were injured.
- On 11 December 1944, a major snowstorm caused a Toronto Transportation Commission streetcar to overturn near Queen and Mutual Streets. One person was killed, and 50 injured.

== Croatia ==
- On 31 October 1954, a Zagreb tram ran away down Mirogoj Road and crashed. Nineteen people were killed and 37 were injured.

== Czech Republic ==
- On 11 April 2008, two Ostrava trams crashed in a head-on collision in a single-track section of the Ostrava-Poruba – Kyjovice-Budišovice tram line near Vřesina. Three people were killed and 66 were injured. The tram driver of one of the trams, who ignored a stop signal, was later sentenced to three years in prison for reckless driving.

== Finland ==
- On 15 September 1920, a Vyborg tram derailed and overturned at a junction. Five people, including the tram driver and a pedestrian, were killed and at least 10 were injured.
- On 15 June 1945 a freight train collided with a Helsinki tram in Sörnäinen harbour. 6 passengers were injured.
- On 13 September 2007 a Helsinki tram caught fire next to Pasila railway station. Nobody was injured but the tram suffered heavy damages.

== France ==
- On 11 January 2025, two trams collided at the Gare Centrale, Strasbourg. At least 30 people were injured.

== Germany ==
- On 17 December 1960, a Convair C-131D Samaritan airplane crashed into the city of Munich and struck a tram and people on the street. The tram's trailer burnt out, and all of its occupants died at the accident site or in hospitals. All 20 persons in the airplane and 32 on the ground were killed.
- On 23 August 1999, a "CitySprinter" prototype tram under evaluation by Cologne Stadtbahn (KVB) ran into the rear of another at Christophstrasse Station, an underground station. Seventy people were injured, seven seriously. The accident was initiated by the failure of the vehicle's electronics, thus blocking control over the brakes, and the passengers' emergency brake was inhibited, as required by safety regulations for tunnels. But the driver missed the opportunity to use a separate emergency halt button. KVB then decided to buy "Bombardier Flexity Swift" trams instead.
- In 2014, a Düsseldorf tram derailed and overturned at a junction. Several people were injured.
- On 15 March 2018 A collision between two trams in Cologne injures 43 people. The driver of one of the trams is suspected to have been driving under the influence of alcohol.
- On 4 February 2020 A tram operated by the Duisburger Verkehrsgesellschaft, derailed in Duisburg and hit a power pole frontally. Two passengers were lightly injured, the driver was stuck in his booth and was seriously injured. The tram itself got towed and was declared as destroyed.
- On 2 November 2020, two trams collided head-on in Cologne. At least 15 people were taken to hospital, including both drivers who suffered serious injuries.
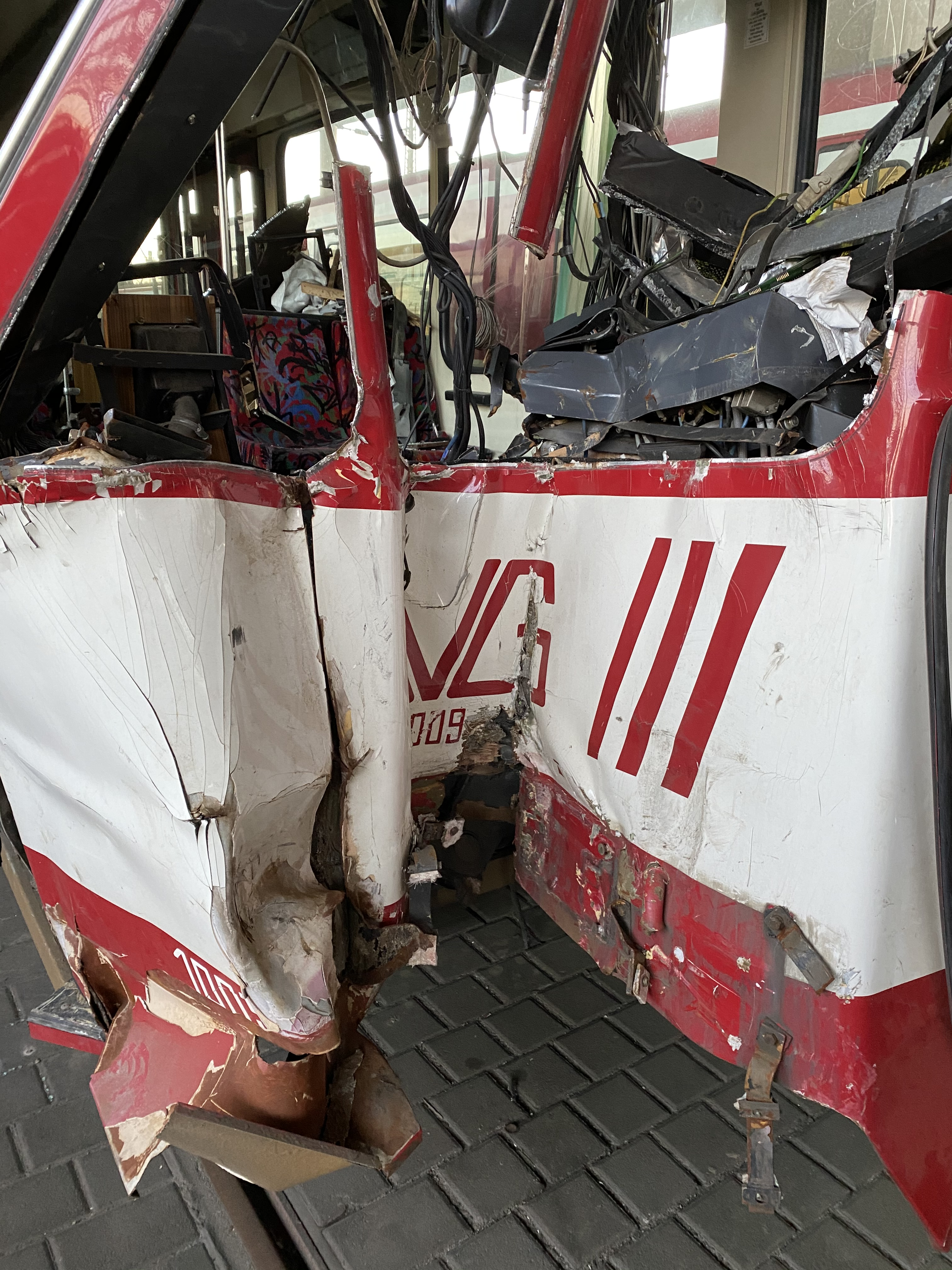
  Photo of the crashed tram 1009 at the Grunewald depot. It was later scrapped and not repaired, because the Duisburger Verkehrsgesellschaft already ordered new vehicles from Bombardier Transportation, hence it was declared as destroyed.

== Hong Kong ==
- In 2013 a Light Rail vehicle was derailed after attempting to take a bend too fast. Seventy-seven people were injured.
- On 6 April 2017, Hong Kong tram No. 123 was in an accident on Des Voeux Road. It was reported to have been travelling too fast and to have collided with a bus and overturned on a bend. Fourteen people were injured. The driver was consequently jailed for eleven months and disqualified from driving any vehicle for two years.

== Japan ==
- On March 25, 2025, According to Ministry of Land, Infrastructure and Transport, Tourism has officially confirmed in a report that two tram vehicles have collided at Kumamoto Castle station, operated by Kumamoto City Transportation Bureau in Kyushu Island. Seven people were injured. (Source: Japan Ministry of Land, Infrastructure and Transportation, Tourism)

== Isle of Man ==
- On 5 April 1930, the tram depot at Laxey, Isle of Man was destroyed by fire. Manx Electric Railway trams 3, 4, 8 and 24, plus trailers 34, 35, 38–41 and 44 were destroyed. Trailer 60 was damaged.
- On 30 March 2016, Snaefell Mountain Railway car No. 3 ran away from Snaefell Summit with nobody on board. The tram derailed before reaching Bungalow station and was destroyed.

== Italy ==
- On 23 September 1890, a number of tram cars left the track between Florence and Fiesole; five passengers were killed.
- On 16 August 2016 two trams had a head-on accident in Trieste, causing the suspension of the only line still active in the city. Since that day the line has been suspended and has currently never been restored.
- On 27 February 2026, a tram derailed in Milan, crashing into a building. Two people were killed and 54 people were wounded.

== Netherlands ==
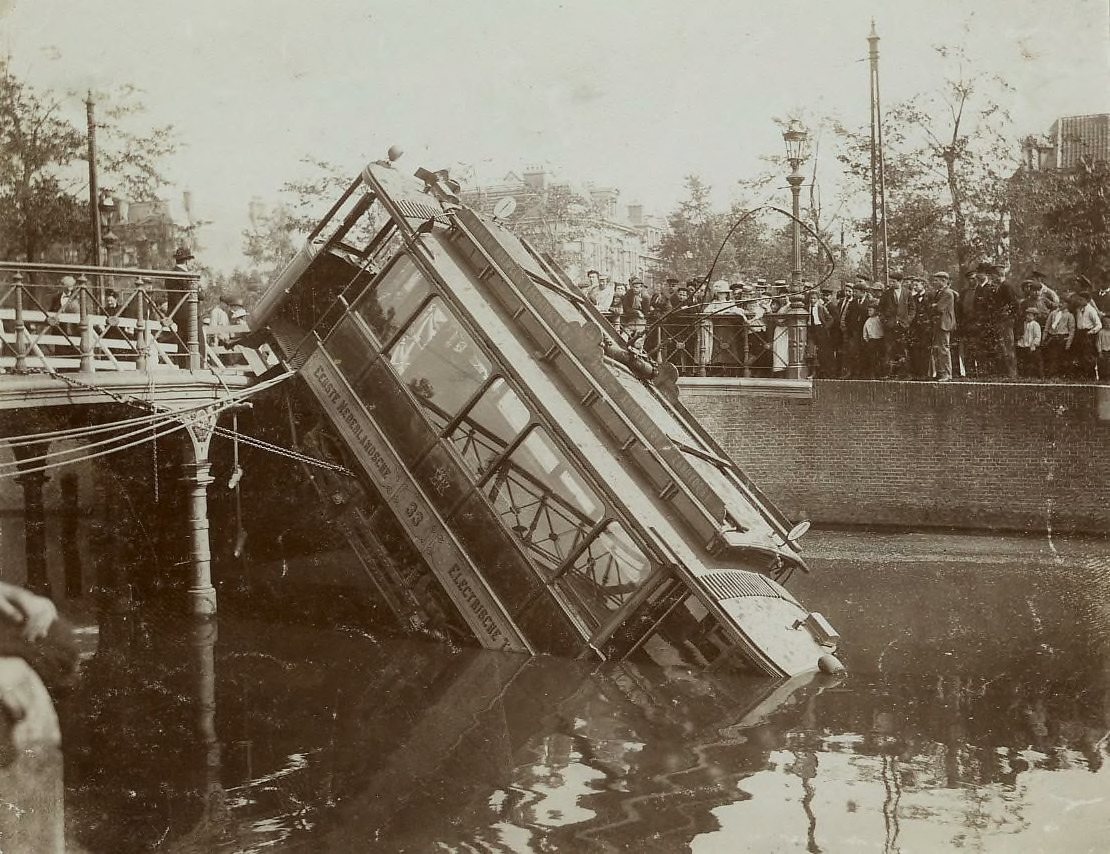
- Tram accident at the Raambrug
  On 3 June 1902, a Haarlemsche Tramway-Maatschappij tram derailed at the Raambrug, Haarlem, North Holland and plunged into a canal.
- On 7 August 1927, two trams of the "Gooische Stoomtram" tramway company crashed in a head-on collision in a single-track section near Laren, North Holland. Four people were killed and seven seriously injured.
- On 27 October 1943, two trams of the "Rotterdamsche Tramweg Maatschappij" tramway company collided with each other on a crossroads near Spijkenisse. Eight people were killed and about forty injured.
- On 2 September 2018, a RET tram ran into the rear of another tram on Dwarsdijk, Rotterdam, injuring nine people.
- On 16 March 2021, an Utrecht sneltram tram carrying six passengers collided with a van and was derailed in Herculeslaan, Utrecht.
- On 17 April 2021, an Utrecht sneltram collided with a car and was derailed in Koekoeslaan, Nieuwegein, Utrecht.
- On 11 July 2025, two trams collided in the Kruisplein, Rotterdam. Eight people were injured.
- On 22 July 2026, two trams collided on the Erasmus Bridge, Rotterdam. More than eighteen people were injured.

== Norway ==
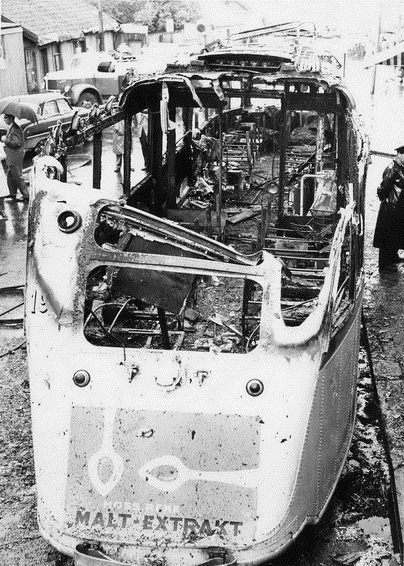
Tram fire in Oslo, 1958.

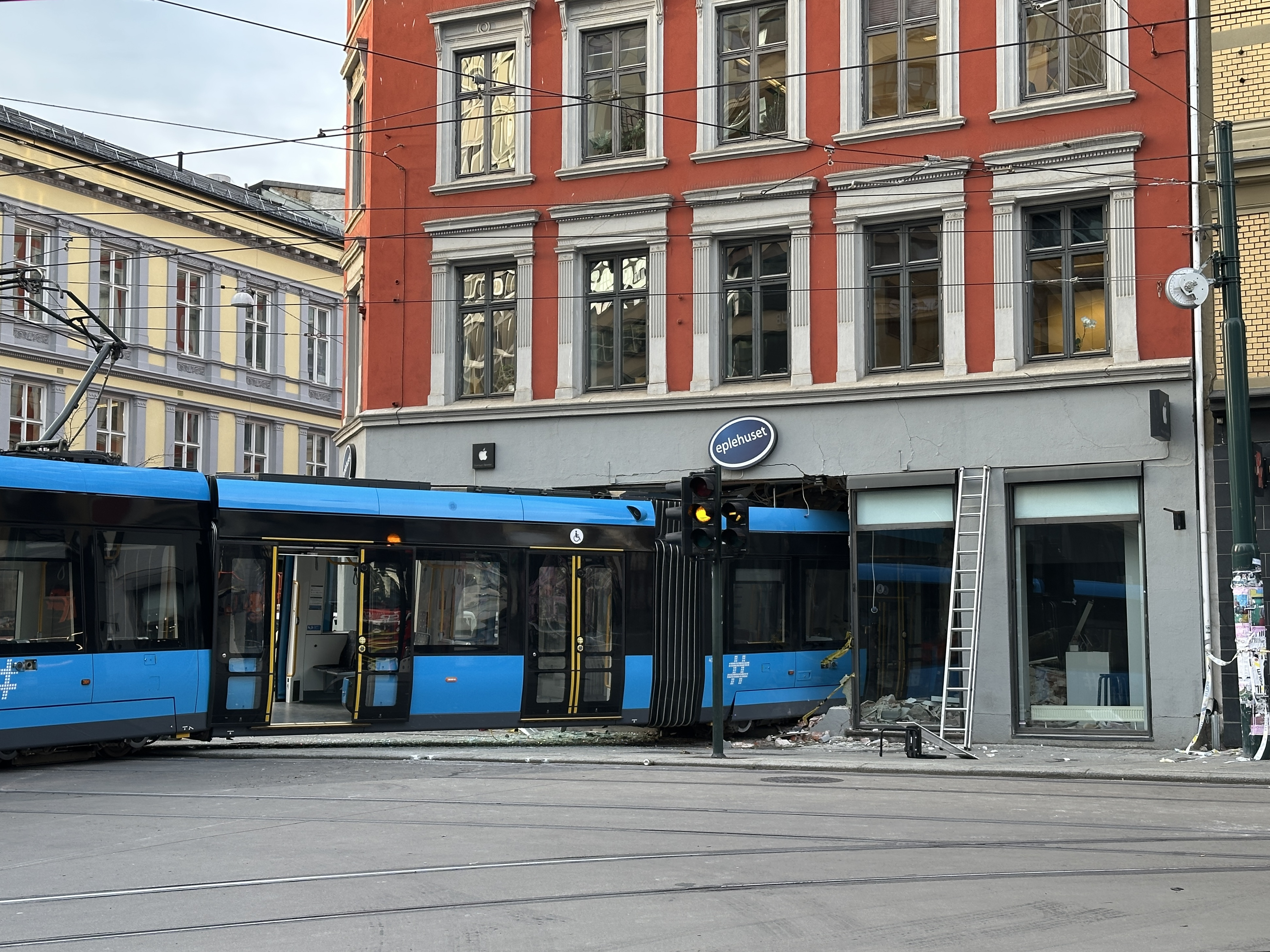
Tram Crash into Apple computer reseller shop in Oslo 2024. Credit: Ssu

- On 15 May 1937, an Oslo Tramway tram derailed in Sannergata street and crashed with a taxi and a timber truck. The taxi driver and a passenger in the truck were killed, and several people injured.
- On 2 August 1958, an Oslo Tramway tram caught fire in Strømsveien Street. Five people were killed, seventeen were injured.
- On 28 March 2023, the Bergen light rail crashed into its end stop. All twelve passengers were reported injured.
- On 29 Oct 2024 an Oslo Tramway tram derailed in Oslo, crashing into Eplehuset, an Apple computer reseller shop. Four people injured.

== Poland ==
- On 7 December 1967, a heavily loaded tram in Szczecin, Poland, consisting of one power car and two trailers, ran away downhill after the dynamic brakes failed, and derailed and overturned on a bend. The accident killed 15 people and injured around 150, 40 of them seriously.
- On 3 September 1987 two trams collided in Warsaw, resulting in 7 fatalities and 73 injured. The young motorman of the tram heading eastbound did not realize the track was switched to take a left turn and caused a head-on collision with a tram heading westbound. Just a few hours later another serious crash occurred in Warsaw. Two trains collided at the Warszawa Włochy station, resulting in another 8 fatalities and several dozen wounded. This day was later called "The Black Thursday".
- In Poznań on 8 September 1993 the motorman of tram No. 10 mistook which route the line was set for and went off the track. The tram fell on its side and then hit the wall of a building. Five people were killed and sixty wounded, the driver was sentenced to three years in prison.

== Portugal ==
- On 15 December 2018, a tram derailed and overturned in Lisbon. Twenty-eight people were injured.
- On 7 April 2019, an electric tram in Lisbon injures seven ‘mainly foreign’ passengers.
- Four people injured on 3 February 2021 due to the derailment of a tram, followed by a collision with another, in downtown Lisbon.
- On 17 August 2023, a collision between two trams in Lisbon causes 13 minor injuries to several tourists and three children.
- On 3 September 2025, the Ascensor da Glória derailed in Lisbon, killing 16 people and wounding 23 more.

== Romania ==
- On 15 February 1994, a V3A tram heading towards Piața Muncii derails at Piața Iancului in Bucharest due to a faulty switch. The last (third) section of the tram tips over and falls over several passengers waiting at the station for the opposite direction, killing between 1 and 3 people (the exact number is unknown)
- On 28 March 1997, during a test ride of a Timiș 2 tram. the rear trailer car derailed due to the poor condition of the track quality, on the CUG-Nicolina route in Iași. The trailer car subsequently collided with an oncoming Tatra T4R tram from the opposite direction, resulting in 5 injuries. The accident led to the closure of the line towards the Heavy Machinery Plant (Combinatul de Utilaje Grele) on 3 April 1997 for the next 18 years.
- On 22 March 2011, a former Bern tram ran away down the Copou hill in Iași. The tram, travelling at over 50 km/h, struck a line of cars that were soon destroyed by the force of impact. One person was left dead and another 6 were injured. No injuries were recorded inside the tram itself.
- On 10 May 2012, at the Lujerului Underpass in Bucharest, three trams were involved in a massive collision that injured up to 100 people. One tram broke down, the second one stopped behind it, but the third one failed to stop in time.
- On 18 July 2012, at the Ferentari-Rahova intersection, also in Bucharest, a tram heading towards its depot derailed after a set of faulty points changed underneath the last section. It entered the path, and struck another oncoming tram, heading the opposite way. Only 18 people were injured, but the damage was so high, that the articulated section of the derailed tram broke into 2 pieces
- On 27 May 2020, at the intersection Șura Mare, two V3A trams collided. 228 on line 7 and 109 on line 11. 228 took the wrong path, instead of going to Giurgiului, it was going to Olteniței. The 109 was coming from Giurgiului, and its driver observed in the last seconds that 228 is on the wrong way and hit it with quite a high speed. Both trams derailed and were severely damaged although repaired later. Possible causes : 1) the automatic switch malfunctioned, leading 228 on wrong path, although it could shortly reestablish its original path in the Șura Mare terminal. 2) Reckless driving of the 109 driver, which is said to have caused early that year another tram accident, although with little damages. Although he observed that 228 took on the wrong path, made no efforts to avoid accident. In this accident there were no deaths, just light injuries. Live video from 109 dashcam is available online. Many people said that the accident could be avoided even though one of the trams slightly mistook paths. Trams were later repaired and still operate.
- On 24 December 2023, at hour 5:58 A.M. at Lizeanu crossroad, two trams collided front to front. One old V3A (239) was coming from Victoriei on line 10, and a new tram, Astra Imperio 3851 was coming from Bucur obor. At the Lizeanu crossroad, the driver of the V3A did not notice that the switch was changed to left side and accelerated. At the same time, 3851 was passing the crossroad, and 239 turned shortly left on the switch and crashed frontally with 3851. There were many hypotheses regarding the way the accident happened. One is that the switch changed suddenly. Second, the driver of 239 did not notice that the switch is on left direction, because usually it is no regular route there, it is mostly used for access in U.R.A.C (workshops for repairing trams) or for temporary diverted routes or access for trams in routes. Both trams were damaged as the accident happened at quite a high speed, and the drivers were both injured. Trams were repaired and are back on routes.
- In the morning of 31 July 2025, tram 311 type V3A modernized type, on line 25, crashed with Otokar bus 6680 on line 385. Both the bus and the tram were severely damaged. According to the video, the bus driver forced the red signal of the traffic light, entered on red in the intersection and collided with the tram which was entering the cross road. It happened at cross road of " Şoseaua Progresului with Calea 13 Septembrie ".

There were many other tram accidents, but usually with little damages and most without injuries and casualties.

== Russia ==
- On 1 December 1930 a tram collided with a freight train in Leningrad. 28 people were killed, 19 were injured.
- On 4 December 1951 in Irkutsk a tram derailed, overturned and hit several people. 7 people were killed, 58 were injured.
- On 13 April 1972 a tram derailed in Tula killing 11 people and injured near 100.
- On 22 December 1980 in Chelyabinsk a tram collided with a crane. 2 passengers were killed, 4 were injured.
- On 25 May 1988 two trams collided in Leningrad. One passenger was killed, near 100 were injured.
- On 26 October 2006 in Samara a tram derailed, overturned and hit several people. 3 people were killed, 6 were injured.
- On 6 June 2024, a tram suffered a brake failure and crashed into another tram at Kemerovo. One person was killed and about 140 were injured.
- On 31 October 2025, a tram derails and collides with two minibuses on a bridge in Tula, killing five people, 20 were injured.

== Serbia ==
- On 12 November 2018, a tram derailed at an intersection in central Belgrade after being hit by a car that ran a red light. A pedestrian died and several people were injured.

== Slovakia ==
- 1978 Košice tram accident: On 30 October 1978, a completely full tram in Košice, Slovakia, ran away down hill and its rear car derailed on a sharp bend near the stop Amfiteáter after the dynamic brakes failed, and the driver called for the emergency brake too late. The accident, which is recorded on film, killed 9 people, and injured many more. However, it is suspected that the VB reduced the death count significantly to avoid further inspection by commission from Prague. This accident was later called "The Košice tram of death". To prevent any further accidents like this, all trams now have a mandatory stop on the hill.

== Spain ==
=== 1889–1929 ===
- On 11 June 1889, two trams collided in Barcelona resulting in one killed and one more injured.
- On 26 March 1893, a train ran over a tram on the Barcelona to Badalona line in Barcelona, killing one and injuring almost 4 more.
- On 15 March 1894, a steam tram from Clot to the San Andrés del Palomar line collided with a train on a level crossing. 1 person was killed and 30 injured.
- On 20 July 1895, a train collided with a tram at a crossing in Valencia and resulted in 3 dead and almost 8 injured.
- On 13 September 1896, two trams collided in Valencia. 1 was killed and 30 more injured.
- On 15 August 1897, a tram from the Horta line derailed in Barcelona, killing one person and injuring 3 more.
- On 5 November 1900, a tram derailed in Madrid killing one and injuring two more.
- On 23 December 1907, a train ran over a tram in Barcelona. One died and five more were injured.
- On 21 June 1912, a tram overturned in Barcelona. One person dies and several people were injured.
- On 29 June 1912, two trams from the San Sebastian to Tolosa line collided near San Sebastián, injuring 24.
- On 2 July 1912 a train ran over a tram in Grao área in Valencia, killing 4 people and injuring 20 more.
- On 9 February 1913 an accident on a tram in Las Palmas de Gran Canaria killed one person.
- On 2 July 1916, a tram derailed and overturned in Palma de Mallorca, killing one and injuring several more.
- On 5 March 1918, a Barcelona tram collided with a freight train on level crossing, killing 5 people and injuring 24.
- On 1 May 1922 a tram deraided and crashed into a wall in Oviedo with 4 dead and 13 injured.
- On 18 July 1921 two trams collided at Castelar square in Madrid, killing one and injuring an unknown number of people.
- On 21 March 1923, a train ran over a tram in Barcelona at Ribas road level crossing. 3 were killed and 20 more injured.
- On 17 August 1927 two trams on the San Sebastián to Tolosa suburban line collided in Oria (Guipúzcoa). 1 died and 6 were injured.

=== 1930–1949 ===
- On 19 April 1933, around 40 people were injured in a collision of two trams in Barcelona.
- On 17 November 1933 a tram lost its brakes in a ramp, derailed and overturned at Vigo, killing 2 and injuring more 60.
- On 5 August 1934 a bus - tram collision in Barcelona left one dead and eleven injured.
- On 11 February 1936, a train collided with a tram in Mislata (Valencia) at a level crossing, killing 4 and injuring 21 more.
- On 19 April 1937, in the Spanish Civil War, during an air raid over Barcelona, a bomb exploded near a tram that ran along Paralelo avenue. The tram derailed and the explosion killed the tram driver and injured several more.
- In July 1937 one person was killed when two trams collided in Barcelona.
- On 1 January 1939 a tram collided with a train at a level crossing near Paterna (Valencia province), 7 died and 16 were injured.
- On 17 August 1939, two trams collided at Cibeles square in Madrid, killing one and injuring several more.
- On 2 September 1940, two trams collided al Urgell avenue in Barcelona. One was killed and several injured.
- On 7 November 1942, a train collided with a tram at Bonanova level crossing in Barcelona. Ine was killed and several injured.
- On 7 April 1944 a tram overturned in Madrid killing 1 and injuring 30 more.
- On 28 June 1944 two trams collided in Madrid injuring 40.
- In September 1946, a tram accident at Santander killed three people.
- On 9 March 1947 two trams covering lines 17 and 23 collided in Sevilla. One was killed and one more injured.
- On 30 June 1947, two trams collided in Madrid. One was killed and 43 injured.
- On 5 August 1947, two trams on lines 60 and 62 collided in Barcelona injuring 29 people.
- On 13 October 1947, one person died in a tram accident in Vigo.
- On 23 October 1947, two trams collided in Madrid. One child was killed and one passenger more injured.
- On 17 November 1947, 30 were injured in Barcelona when a tram on line 48 collided with the barrier of a level crossing.
- On 13 December 1947, a lorry collided with the rear of a tram in Madrid, killing 1 and injuring 5.
- On 2 February 1948, a train ran over a tram at a crossing in Pedro IV street in Barcelona, killing one and injuring 8 more.
- On 13 October 1948, two trams collided in Barcelona. 24 were injured.
- On 30 October 1948 a tram derailed and crashed into a wall in Bilbao. One woman died and 27 people were injured.
- On 6 November 1948, a tram collided with a lorry at Paseo Imperial in Madrid. One died and two more were injured.
- On 24 January 1949, a collision of two trams in Madrid caused 24 injured.
- On 1 March 1949, two trams collided in Barcelona. 1 dies and 4 were injured.
- On 24 August 1949, one person died in a tram - lorry collision in Sevilla.

=== 1950–1965 ===
- On 8 April 1950, a tram and a taxi collided in Sevilla. The tram overturned and several people were trapped under the tram. 2 were killed and 22 injured.
- On 28 November 1950, a tram of the Ferrol - Xubia line derailed and crashed into a wall. 1 was killed and 4 injured.
- On 28 May 1952, in Madrid, a tram on line 31 fell from the bridge of Toledo onto the river Manzanares riverbank. 15 people died and 112 were injured, 44 seriously.
- On 16 September 1952, a train - tram collision in Mislata (Valencia) killed 5 and injured 26 more.
- On 5 November 1952, a tram - tram collision on the Ivenida Icaria level crossing in Barcelona caused 4 deaths and 39 injuries.
- On 19 May 1953, in Madrid, a tram lost its brakes on a ramp and collided into the rear of another one. 1 died and 54 were injured.
- On 27 June 1953, two trams collided in Barcelona. 1 died and 20 were injured.
- On 27 November 1953, two trams collided in Madrid, injuring 25.
- On 27 January 1955, two trams collided in Madrid, 1 died and 10 were injured.
- On 18 March 1957 around 100 people were injured when two trams on lines 70 and 71 collided due the fog near river Besós bridge in Barcelona.
- On 28 December 1959, three trams collided in Barcelona. One was killed.
- On 13 January 1961, a tram - lorry collision killed one and injured several more in Barcelona.
- On 1 September 1965, a bus - tram collision in Barcelona injured 35.

== Sweden ==
- On 12 March 1992, Gothenburg tram Model M21 No. 245 lost its electric power at Kapellplatsen. In an attempt to move the tram out of traffic, the automatic brakes were disabled causing the tram to hurtle backwards down a hill at more than 100 kilometres per hour (62 mph) with a driver on board, unable to stop it, and a police car racing alongside, with sirens on to alert the public. The tram hit cars, before derailing at Vasaplatsen, folding in half and hitting people and cars waiting at the stop, coming to a stop after crashing into a building and bursting into flames. Thirteen people were killed and around 30 were seriously injured.
- On 20 June 2025, Gothenburg tram Model M31 No. 379 derailed and crashed into a snack bar at Kungsportsavenyen after its driver lost consciousness. Four people in the tram and four people inside the snack bar were injured.

== Switzerland ==
- On 15 January 1926 a tram was derailed by snow near Zug, with the death of three passengers.
- On 10 November 1966, a tram derailed in Zürich, Switzerland and crashed into a building. A passenger was killed and 71 were injured.

== Ukraine ==
- On 10 January 1972 in Lviv (Ukrainian SSR) an overcrowded tram derailed, crashed into a crowd of people. 26 people were killed.
- On 2 July 1996, in Kamianske, Ukraine, an overcrowded tram car carrying at least 150 people derailed and crashed through a concrete wall, after its brakes failed while going down a steep hill. The disaster killed 34 people and injured over 100 others.

== United Kingdom ==
=== 1880s ===
- On 14 October 1881, a Newcastle Corporation Tramways tram was blown over in a gale at Newcastle upon Tyne. Several people were severely wounded.
- On 7 August 1882, a Blackburn and Over Darwen Tramways Company tram ran away, derailed and overturned at Ewood Bridge, Blackburn. One person was killed and 30 were injured.
- On 3 July 1883, a Huddersfield Corporation Tramways steam tram engine and trailer ran away downhill and derailed at the junction of Westgate and Railway Street. Seven people were killed and twenty were injured.
- On 29 December 1883, a tram ran away downhill on the Wigan and Pemberton Tramway after the driver had left the tram to snatch a child from danger that was in front of the tram. The tram hit another tram killing one of the passengers.
- On 12 September 1885, a Bradford and Sheffield Tramways tram ran away downhill from the Wibsey Bank Foot depot in Bradford after being steamed up, it hit and killed a pedestrian and a man driving a horse-drawn vehicle.

=== 1890s ===
- On 19 September 1898, a Bradford City Tramways tram ran away on Horton Bank, derailed and crashed. One person was killed, fourteen were seriously injured.

=== 1900s ===
- On 28 June 1902, a Huddersfield Corporation Tramways electric tram ran away down Somerset Road and crashed on Wakefield Road. Three people were killed and several injured.
- On 1 June 1906, Swindon Corporation Tramways tram No. 11 ran away on Victoria Road and overturned. Five people were killed, 30 were injured.
- On 23 June 1906, Metropolitan Electric Tramways tram No. 115 ran away in Archway Road, crashed into five other vehicles and another tram. Three people were killed, twenty were injured.
- On 1 July 1906, Halifax Corporation Tramways tram No. 94 ran away down New Bank, derailed and overturned. Two people were killed, eleven were injured.
- On 1 April 1907, South Metropolitan Electric Tramways tram No. 19 ran away, derailed and overturned in Wallington. Two people were killed, 36 were injured.
- On 31 July 1907, Bradford City Tramways tram No. 210 derailed in Church Bank due to a fractured axle. Two people were killed and sixteen were injured.

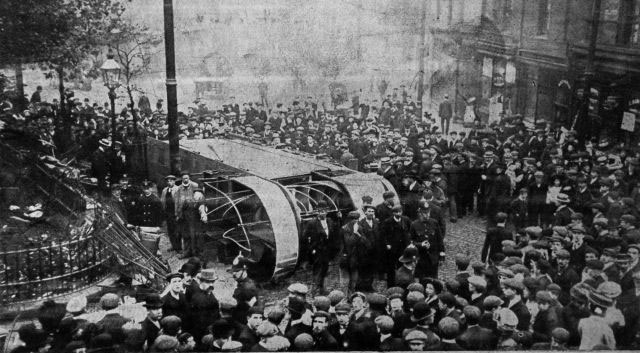
Birmingham.

- On 1 October 1907, a City of Birmingham Tramways Company Ltd tram ran away down Ickneild Street, derailed and overturned. Two people were killed and eleven were injured.
- On 15 October 1907, Halifax Corporation Tramways tram No. 64 ran away backwards down Pye Nest Road and derailed. Six people were killed, 37 were injured.
- On 1 May 1908, Bournemouth Corporation Tramways tram No. 72 ran away down Poole Hill and derailed at Fairlight Glen. Seven people were killed, 26 were injured.

=== 1910s ===
- On 5 June 1911, Stalybridge, Hyde, Mossley & Dukinfield Tramways & Electricity Board tram No. 44 ran away down Ditchcroft Hill, Stalybridge, derailed and overturned. One person was killed, 33 were injured.
- On 2 September 1911, London County Council Tramways tram No. 110 derailed and overturned in Lewisham High Road. One person was killed, 35 were injured.
- On 20 October 1911, a Stalybridge, Hyde, Mossley and Dukinfield Tramways & Electricity board tram ran away down Stamford Road, Mossley, derailed and crashed onto the railway at Mossley railway station. The guard and four passengers were killed, four passengers were seriously injured.
- On 18 October 1913, Tynemouth and District Electric Traction Company tram No. 23 collided with trolley wagon No. 27 at Benton Farm. Two people were killed, six were injured.
- On 27 November 1914, Devonport and District Tramways tram No. 25 was derailed at Paradise Road due to excessive speed on a curve. Three people were killed, 33 were injured.
- On 2 December 1914, Barnsley and District Tramway tram No. 4 ran away on Eldon Street North, derailed and crashed into a shop. Two people were killed, four were injured.
- On 5 February 1916, Gateshead and District Tramways Company tram No. 7 ran away in Bensham Road and derailed on a curve. Four people were killed, ten were injured.
- On 28 December 1916, a Luton Corporation Tramways tram ran away and derailed at the junction of Old Bedford Road and Midland Road. Seven people were injured, one seriously.
- On 7 March 1917, Exeter Corporation Tramways tram No. 17 ran away and derailed in Fore Street. One person was killed and three were injured.

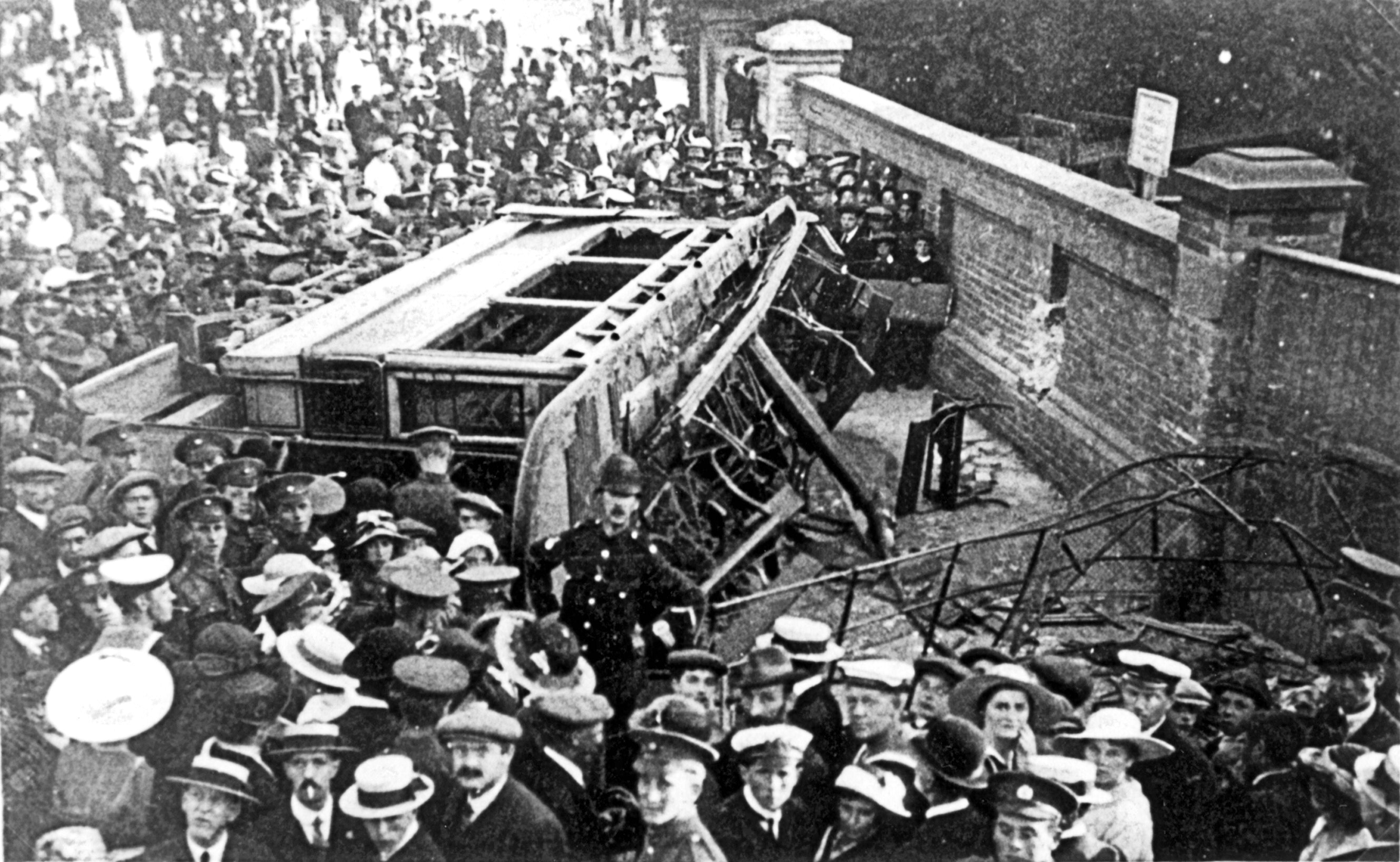
Crabble, Dover

- On 19 August 1917, Dover Corporation Tramways tram No. 23 ran away down Crabble Hill, derailed and overturned. Eleven people were killed and sixty were injured. This was the deadliest tram accident in the United Kingdom.
- On 1 February 1918, Bradford City Tramways tram No. 88 derailed and overturned in Chapel Lane, Allerton. One person was killed and nineteen were injured.
- On 5 December 1918, Glasgow Corporation Tramways Car No. 157 derailed and overturned in Victoria Road opposite Queen's Park Gate, when it left the rails and overturned. Three people were killed and fifty six were injured.
- On 8 October 1919, Burton and Ashby Light Railway tram No. 19 ran away backwards in Bearwood Hill Road and was derailed. Two people were killed, sixteen were injured.

=== 1920s ===
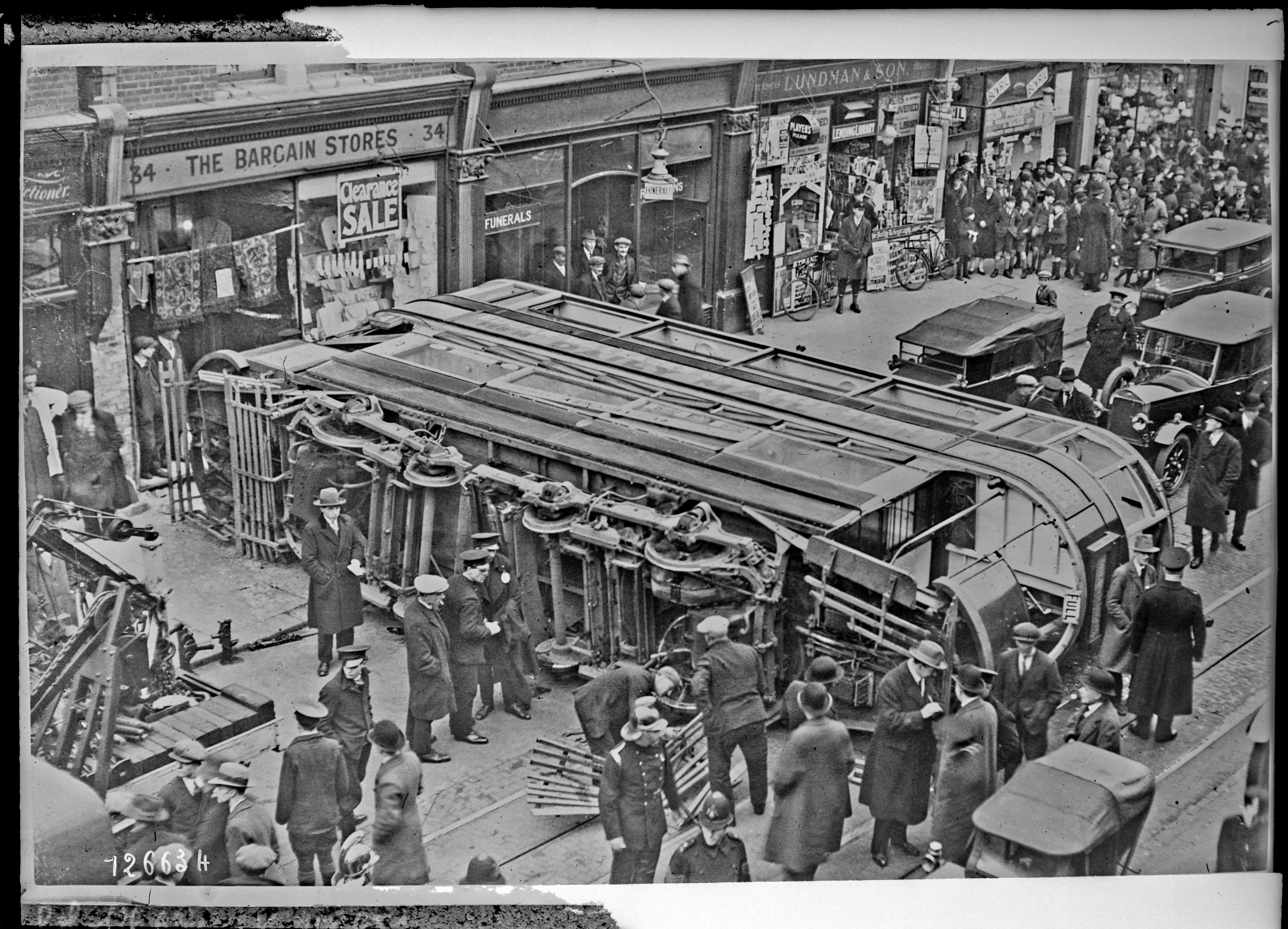
Tram accident in London, February 1928

- On 19th November 1921, Ada Maud Mary Pardoe of Oldbury Road, Smethwick was running to cross St Pauls Road and tripped on the tracks and was dragged under the Birmingham Corporation Tramcar headed to Birmingham and killed. She was 20 years old, a tragic accident that the driver of the Tramcar was powerless to stop. Inquest was posted in the Smethwick Telephone 26th November 1921.
- On 27 September 1920, a tramcar ran away down a hill in Lancaster, killing a pedestrian and injuring several passengers.
- On 21 December 1923, a lorry collided with Barnsley and District Tramway tram No. 10, which ran away backwards and derailed at Lane Head. Two people were killed, seven were injured.
- In 1926, a tram ran away downhill and crashed in Bridge Street, Darwen. Two people were killed.

=== 1930s ===
- On 12 April 1930, a Glasgow Corporation Tramways tram derailed and overturned at the junction to Dumbarton Road and Crow Road. Two passengers were killed and around 60 were injured, eighteen seriously.
- On 23 August 1932, Great Orme Tramway tram No. 4 derailed and hit a wall. The driver and a passenger were killed, ten passengers were seriously injured.
- On 3 July 1933, a Bath Tramways Company tram ran away backwards on Wells Road and crashed into another tram. A passenger was killed and fifteen were injured.
- On 2 January 1934, a Liverpool Corporation Tramways tram ran away down a hill, derailed and overturned in Crown Street. One person was killed and 35 injured, several seriously.
- On 25 March 1934, a London tram derailed and overturned on a curve in Eltham due to excessive speed. Four people were injured.

=== 1950s ===
- On 24 May 1950, a tramcar and double-decker-bus collided on Great Western Road in Glasgow, killing seven and injuring 43.
- On 30 March 1953, a Glasgow Corporation Tramways tram overturned due to excessive speed through a junction. Fifty-six people were injured.
- On 28 January 1959, a Glasgow Corporation Tramways tram collided with a lorry and caught fire. The tram driver and two passengers were killed. Thirty people were injured. This was the last fatal tram accident on a British first-generation tramway.

=== 1990s ===
- On 12 August 1996, a lorry collided with a Manchester Metrolink tram at the junction of Corporation Street and Miller Street. Sixteen people were injured, one seriously.

=== 2000s ===
- On 19 December 2006, trams 09 and 10 of the Midland Metro collided in Winson Green, injuring a group of people while en route to the Metro's then Birmingham Snow Hill terminus.
- September 2008 – Croydon. The driver of a double deck bus misread traffic signals which had been altered the day beforehand, colliding with a tram and derailing it. The bus ran into a shop and a passenger on the upper deck was ejected through a side window (toughened glass) and died from injuries received.

=== 2010s ===
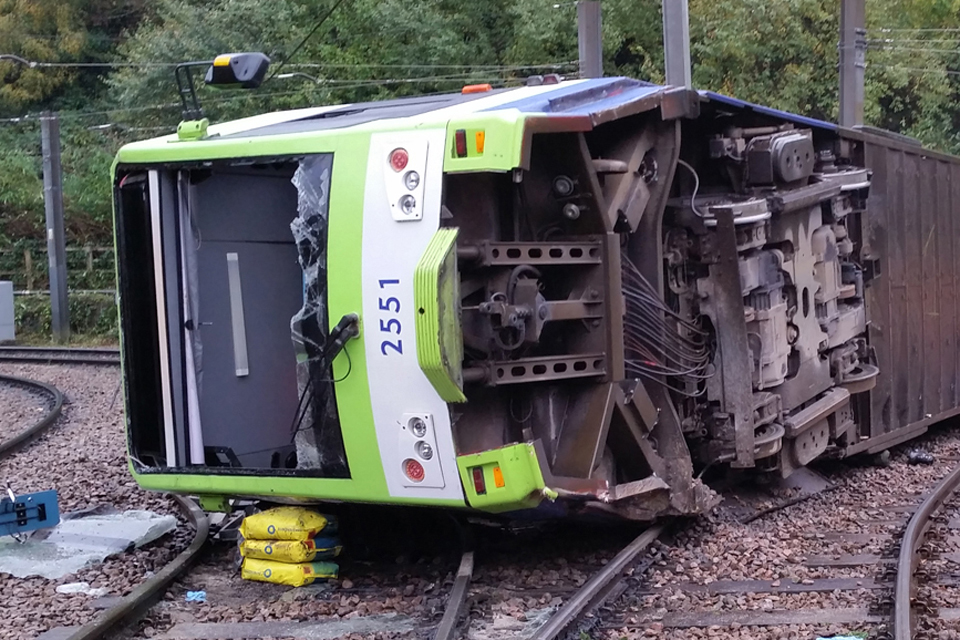
Sandilands.

- On 9 November 2016, a London Tramlink tram derailed at Sandilands in Croydon due to excessive speed on a curve. Seven people were killed and 62 were injured. This was the first accident on a modern British tram system with non-pedestrian fatalities.
- On 25 October 2018 a Sheffield Supertram operating on the opening day of the Tram-Train route to Rotherham collided with a lorry at the Staniforth Road/Woodburn Road junction in Attercliffe. Several people were taken to hospital but there were no fatalities. The driver of the lorry pleaded guilty to driving through a red light, and was fined £250.
- On 30 November 2018 a Sheffield Supertram operating on the same Tram-Train route collided with a car at exactly the same location. Several people were treated at the scene for minor injuries, and one was taken to hospital but later discharged. There were no major injuries or fatalities. The cause of this incident is currently unknown and under investigation.
- West Midlands Metro tram 31 was derailed on 19 August 2019 by collision with a private vehicle. The car driver was injured as were the tram driver and four passengers on the tram. The crash was caused by the car driver running a red light on the Bilston Road Island, close to Wolverhampton City Centre.

=== 2020s ===
- On 23 July 2021, Sheffield Supertram tram 105 was derailed in a collision with a lorry on Cricket Inn Road, Sheffield. One person was taken to hospital with minor injuries.
- On 12 June 2023, a Nottingham Express Transit tram derailed at Bulwell and collided with a pole forming part of the catenary system.
- On 4 March 2024, a Nottingham Express Transit tram collided with a 11 year old cyclist, leaving the child with major injuries.
- On 18 October 2024, a Manchester Metrolink tram collided head-on with a bus in the city centre resulting in four injuries
- On 22 February 2025, a Manchester Metrolink tram struck a van driving dangerously at the junction of Nicholas Street and Mosley Street within the city centre, causing the van to mount the pavement, striking and killing a 3-year-old girl.
- On 19 February 2026, a Nottingham Express Transit tram collided with a bus at Inham Road in Chilwell and derailed. A number of passengers were treated for minor injuries.

== United States ==
- On 5 October 1883, a streetcar was in collision with a passenger train on a grade crossing in Philadelphia, Pennsylvania. Three people were killed and ten were injured.
- On 12 May 1889 a streetcar descending Denny Hill in Seattle, Washington, suffered a cable malfunction and crashed after hitting a sharp curve. The crash killed one passenger and injured another.
- On 1 November 1893, a streetcar in Portland, Oregon plunged into the Willamette River after running off an open swing bridge. Seven people died.

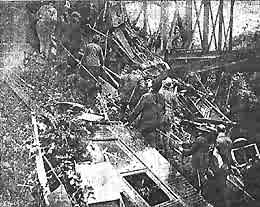
Tacoma, Washington.

- On 4 July 1900, an overcrowded Tacoma Railway & Power tram car derailed and plunged into a ravine in Tacoma, Washington. The accident killed 43 people and left 65 others injured.
- On 7 November 1916, Boston Elevated Railway Co. streetcar No. 393 smashed through the warning gates of the open Summer Street drawbridge in Boston, Massachusetts, plunging into the frigid waters of Fort Point Channel, killing 46 people.
- On 24 December 1917, a Pittsburgh Railways streetcar ran away downhill in the Mount Washington Transit Tunnel after becoming detached from the wire and derailed and overturned on a curve. The car slid on its side until hitting a telegraph pole which ripped the roof off. Twenty-one people were killed and 80 were injured.
- On 14 November 1944, two Pittsburgh Railways streetcars collided in a heavy fog, killing five people and injuring thirty-five.
- On 25 May 1950, a petrol tanker collided with a streetcar in Chicago, Illinois, creating a fire which destroyed five buildings. A total of 34 people were killed on the tramcar and another 50 left injured, either on the tram or in the surrounding area.
- On 10 February 1978, a Pittsburgh Railways streetcar was in a head-on collision with a bus near the Palm Garden Bridge. Four people were killed and 28 were injured.
- On 15 April 1978, Squaw Valley Aerial Tramway disaster: one of the cables became dislodged; it sliced into the cabin killing 3 of the 44 passengers on board. The accident resulted in four deaths and 22 injuries.
- On 29 October 1987, a Pittsburgh Light Rail 1700-series PCC car was going downhill through Mount Washington Transit Tunnel when its brakes failed. The driver ordered the passengers to the back of the trolley as it picked up speed. The streetcar sideswiped a city bus and a truck, ripped out a utility pole and fire hydrant then ran into a six-story, brick office building. Thirty-seven people were injured, four seriously, but there were no fatalities. All three braking systems on the car had failed: the drum, track and dynamic rail brakes.
- On 9 December 2021, a SEPTA trolley collided with a CSX Transportation freight train on a grade crossing at Darby, Pennsylvania. Seven people were injured.

== Zimbabwe ==
- On 7 July 2014 a freight train hit a tram at Victoria Falls Railway Station, Zimbabwe which was attempting to move off the main line, killing 1 person and injuring at least 12 others.
