= 1996 Dniprodzerzhynsk tram accident =

Deadly tram accident in Ukraine

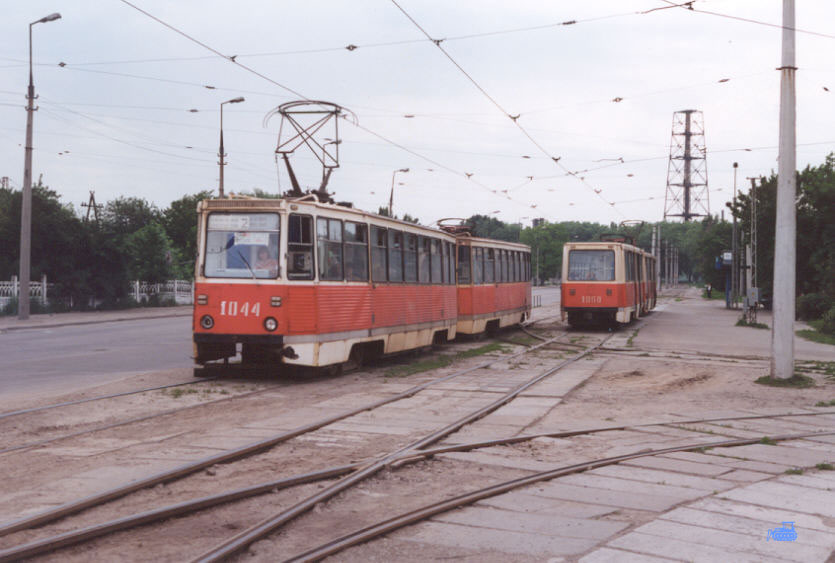
- Tram car number 1044 involved in the crash, as seen in 1992.

Details
- Date: July 2, 1996; 18:00 local time (15:00 UTC)
- Location: Kamianske (at the time Dniprodzerzhynsk), Dnipropetrovsk Oblast
- Coordinates: 48°29′59.7″N 34°38′12.4″E
- Country: Ukraine
- Line: 2a on Chapaev Street
- Operator: Dniprodzerzhynsk Tramway
- Incident type: Derailment
- Cause: Brake failure

Statistics
- Trains: 1
- Passengers: ≥ 150
- Deaths: 34
- Injured: 100+

On 2 July 1996, an overcrowded tram derailed during the evening rush hour in Dniprodzerzhynsk (now Kamianske), Ukraine, and crashed into a concrete wall. An investigation by the local railway department discovered that the brakes on the tram car failed as it was going down a hill. The derailment and subsequent crash killed a total of 34 people, and left over 100 others injured. The incident was the deadliest tram accident in Ukraine, and one of the deadliest tram disasters anywhere in the world, surpassing the 1954 Zagreb tram accident which killed 19 people.

== Crash ==
The crash occurred on a tram line on Hetman Doroshenko Street, later dismantled in 2003. A KTM-5M3 tram, inventory number 1044, departed on line 2a during the late afternoon on 2 July 1996. At around 18:00 local time (15:00 UTC), the tram – which was carrying at least 150 passengers – began to rapidly accelerate down a steep hill on Hetman Doroshenko Street (then Chapaev Street) towards Anoshkina Avenue (Leningrad Prospect) reaching 70 kilometres per hour (43 mph). As the tram was traveling down the hill, its brakes failed, causing the tram car to derail and turn upside down. The tram proceeded to smash through a concrete median barrier, causing the metal case of the cabin to detach and shear off the roof of the car, before stopping just short of a secondary school. Out of the estimated 150 passengers on board, 29 were killed immediately and another 5 died subsequently in the hospital. Over 100 other people were left injured.

== Aftermath ==
In response to the disaster, the Ukrainian president Leonid Kuchma declared a day of national mourning on 3 July, and sent a message of condolence, which was addressed to the acting head of the Dnipropetrovsk regional administration. He also set up an investigation committee, which later determined that overcrowding and brake failure was the cause of the disaster. A celebration had initially been planned for 3 July, in recognition of the adoption of the Ukrainian Constitution. However, following the crash all festivities scheduled for the day were canceled, and somber music was aired on state television and radio stations. Following a governmental inquiry into the cause of the crash, the mayor, Serhiy Shershnev, and his deputy, Ihor Laktionov, resigned.

== See also ==
- 1907 Birmingham Tramway accident
- 2016 Croydon tram derailment
- List of rail accidents (1990–99)
- List of tram accidents
