= 1978 Košice tram accident =

Tram accident in Košice, Czechoslovakia

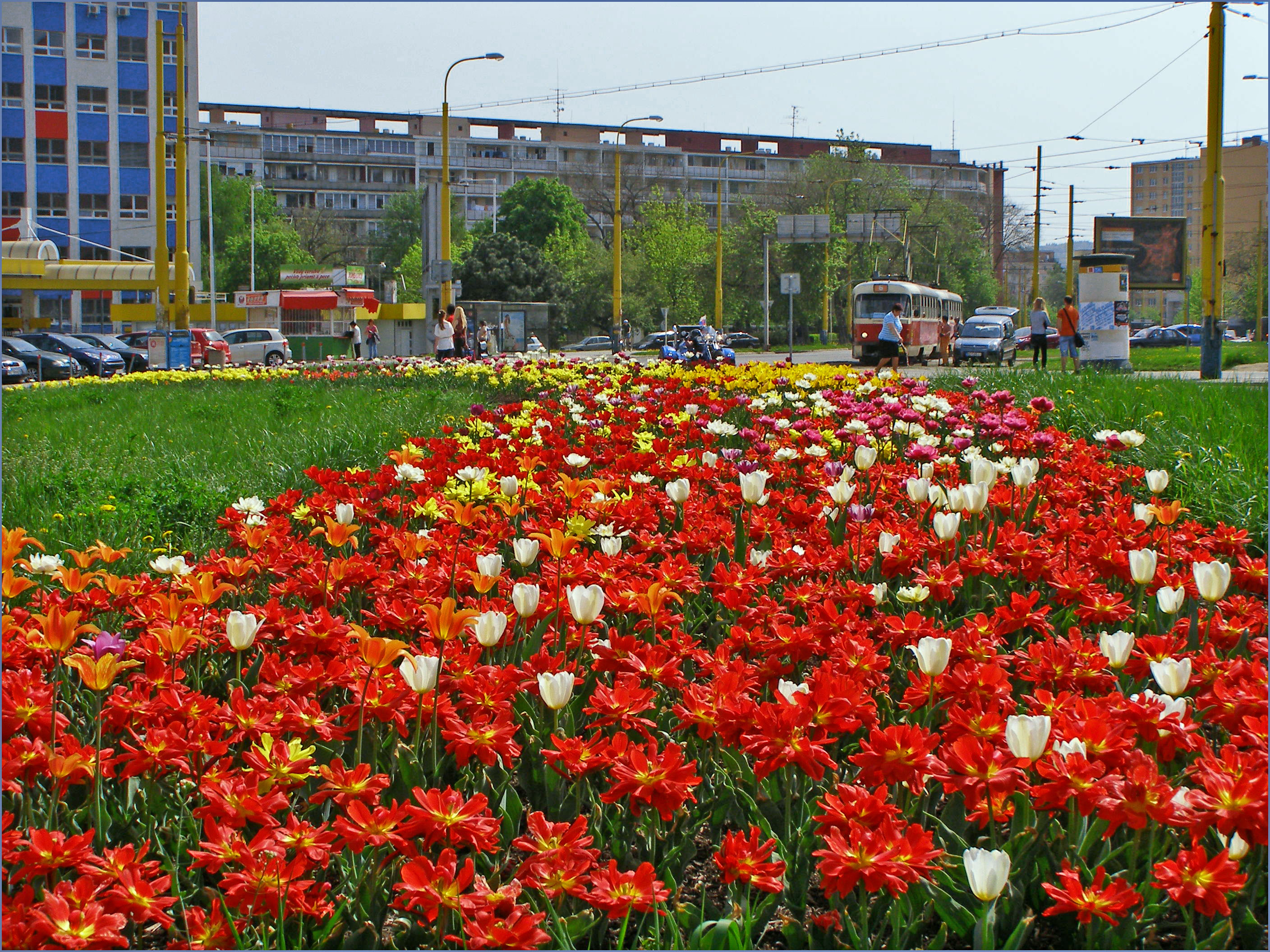
- View from Festival Square to the scene of the accident on Czechoslovak Army Street

Details
- Date: 30 October 1978; Around 07:20
- Location: Festivalové námestie, Košice
- Coordinates: 48.7278°N 21.24316°E
- Country: Czechoslovakia (now Slovakia)

Statistics
- Deaths: 9
- Injured: 90

On 30 October 1978, an accident of tram line No. 6 occurred in Košice, Czechoslovakia. A set of Tatra T3 trams on line 6 lost control while driving downhill on the SNP Avenue to the Amphitheatre and, due to excessive speed, derailed, overturned and crashed into trees. The accident killed 9 people and injured 90. It is the largest accident in the history of urban transport in Slovakia and is considered one of the biggest tram accidents in the history of Central Europe.

== Crash ==
On Monday, 30 October 1978, at 07:20, two Tatra T3 tram carriages were full with passengers trying to get to work or school in the early hours of the morning. It is estimated that there were about 200 passengers in the two tram carriages. During the ride, passengers noticed that the tram was accelerating at an unusual speed when going downhill. During investigations, it was said that the tram driver shouted for people to hold on because the tram's brakes were not working. Others say that the driver said nothing because she was trying to stop the tram. The driver was unable to stop the tram and it passed the stop at the amphitheatre at an estimated speed of 77–85 km/h. The tram derailed around a bend. The first carriage overturned first, followed by the second. The tram was stopped by a tree on the track.

The accident killed nine people, including the driver. Ten passengers were seriously injured, and another eighty suffered minor injuries.

== Aftermath ==
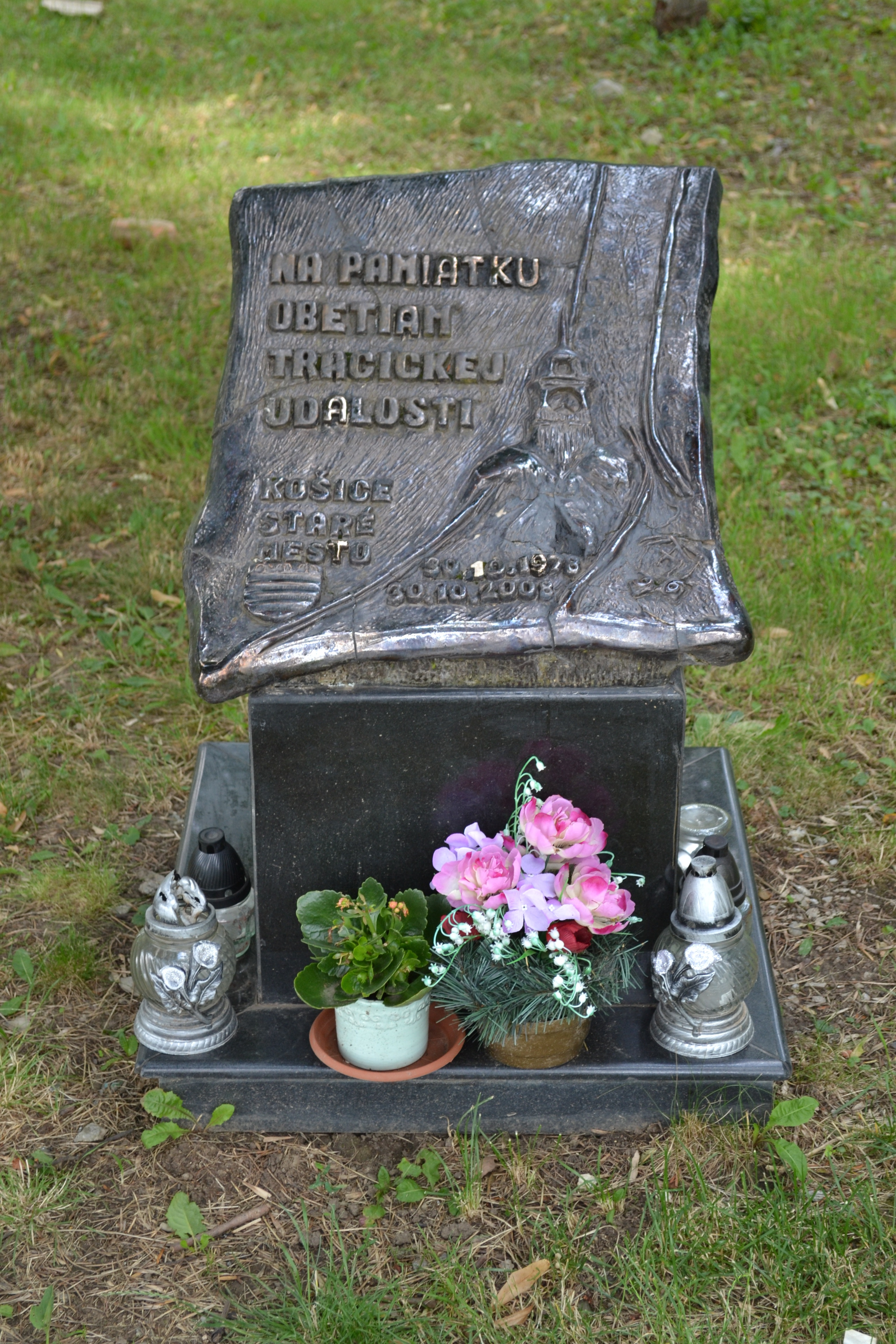
Memorial to the victims at the site of the accident

The investigation of the accident is often questioned, which is mainly due to the fact that the tram driver reported problems with the brakes and was ordered to complete the journey despite the malfunction and also that the state security officers shredded the investigation report in 1989. Only the resolution of the Public Security Investigation Department of 27 December 1978, has been preserved. This resolution identifies the tram driver, Marta Lileková, as the sole culprit in the accident.

On 30 October 2008, on the occasion of the 30th anniversary of the accident, a monument dedicated to the event was created by sculptor Zbynek Nišponský.

== See also ==
- List of tram accidents
