= 1950 Chicago streetcar crash =

Streetcar accident in Illinois, US

Coordinates: 41°46′48.2″N 87°37′31.3″W

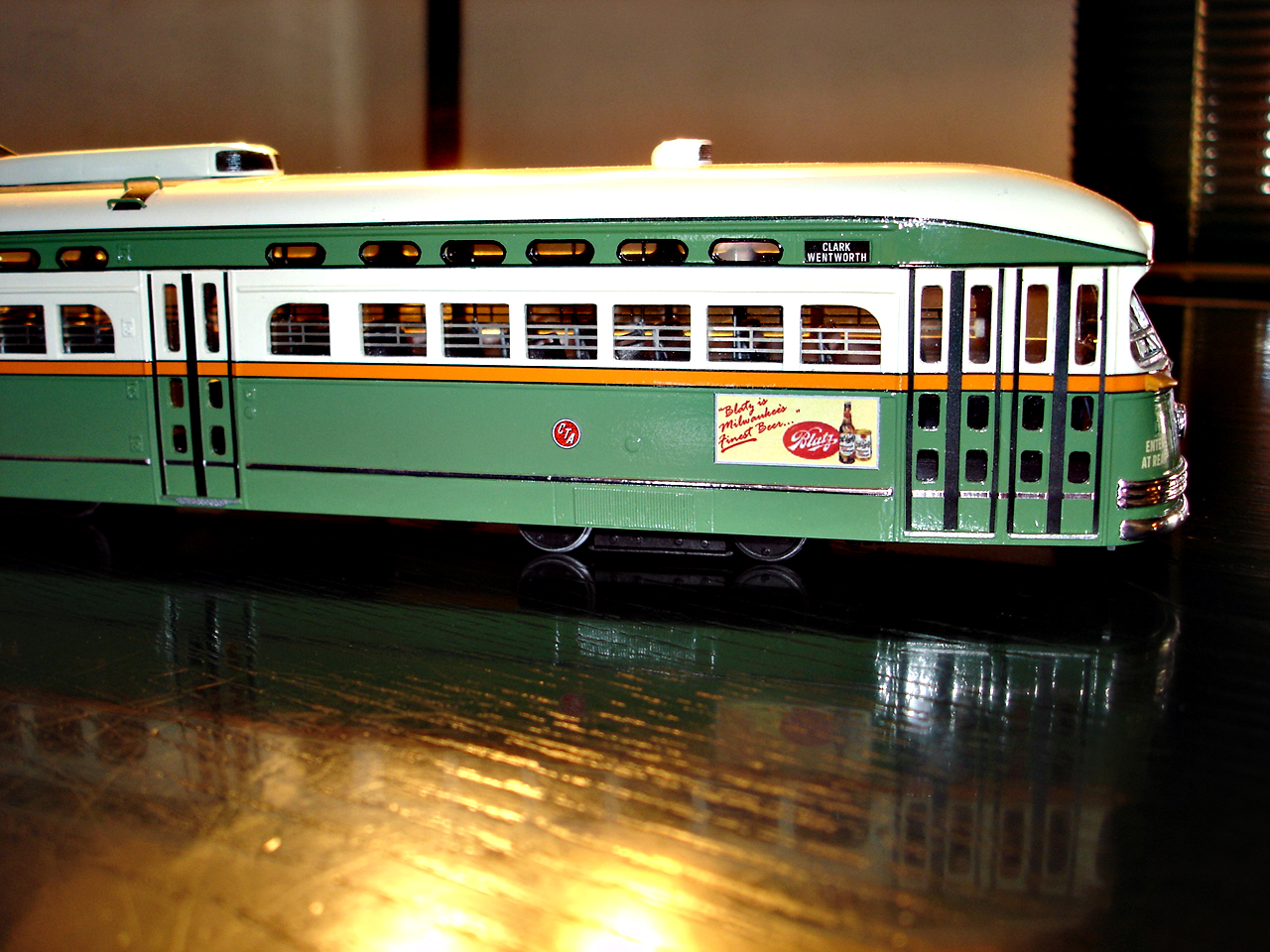
- A model replica of the Green Hornet streetcar

Details
- Date: May 25, 1950
- Location: Chicago, Illinois
- Country: United States
- Line: Green Hornet Streetcar
- Incident type: Collision
- Cause: Driver error

Statistics
- Deaths: 34
- Injured: 50
- Damage: $150,000 (estimated to be approximately $1,750,000 in 2022)

The 1950 CTA Streetcar Crash, also known as the Green Hornet Streetcar Disaster, occurred on May 25, 1950, when a Chicago Transit Authority (CTA) streetcar collided with a gasoline truck in Chicago, Illinois, United States. The resulting explosion killed 34 people and injured 50 others, remaining one of the most deadly public transit disasters in Chicago history. Over 100 people were made homeless by the collateral damage to adjacent buildings.

== Crash ==
The collision occurred at the intersection of 63rd and State Streets at around 6:30 p.m. on May 25, 1950. The streetcar was headed south on State Street but suddenly switched eastbound to avoid a flooded underpass. "Apparently, the motorman of the streetcar was not paying attention, and went through that switch at total velocity, and hit the side of that truck with dire consequences," said Craig Cleve, author of the book The Green Hornet Streetcar Disaster. The gasoline truck jackknifed after the collision and blocked State Street 200 feet north of 63rd Street. The motorman of the streetcar, Paul Manning, died at his post. The driver of the truck, Mel Wilson, died in the cab of the truck while the conductor of the streetcar, William C. Liddell, survived.

Fourteen-year-old Beverley Clark was alone as a passenger on the tram at the time of the collision and managed to open the center door using the emergency handle, saving several people from the inferno. The passengers swelled to the rear doors (which opened inward). The conductor William Liddell managed to temporarily open the rear doors. Arleen Franzen escaped through a small side window but others got trapped in this small gap.

63rd & State St. (Chicago)
The location of the crash was on the South Side of Chicago

== Consequences ==
Thirty-four people died in the streetcar while another fifty, some on the streetcar and others in the surrounding area, were injured. According to the National Safety Council’s report two days after the crash, it was the largest death toll from a motor vehicle collision, surpassing the 29 people killed in a 1940 Texas train-truck collision. Some victims were identified immediately because of personal belongings whereas other victims were identified at the Cook County Morgue by friends and relatives in the days following the crash.

In addition to the lives lost, nearby buildings and parked cars were consumed by the flames. Five buildings were completely destroyed between 6239 and 6247 State Street on the east side. The total property damage was estimated to be around $150,000 (estimated to be $1,502,663.90 in 2016). William C. Liddell, the streetcar conductor, disappeared after the crash but was arrested the day after, charged with leaving the scene of the accident.

== Aftermath ==
In 1955, the Chicago Transit Authority claimed it paid a total of $900,000 to families of the deceased. The accident was highly investigated, drawing conclusions as to what could prevent another such catastrophe. Among them were the addition of drainage systems for frequently flooded underpasses so operators would not have to detour, two yearly physical examinations of motormen, and streetcar doors that could remain open in case of an emergency to allow for evacuation. However, in 1958 the CTA elected to stop using streetcars entirely. They were replaced by transit buses that still run today.

== See also ==
- List of tram accidents
- 1972 Chicago commuter rail crash
- 1977 Chicago Loop derailment
