= 1954 Zagreb tram accident =

Transport incident in Zagreb, Croatia

Coordinates: 45°49′44″N 15°58′48″E

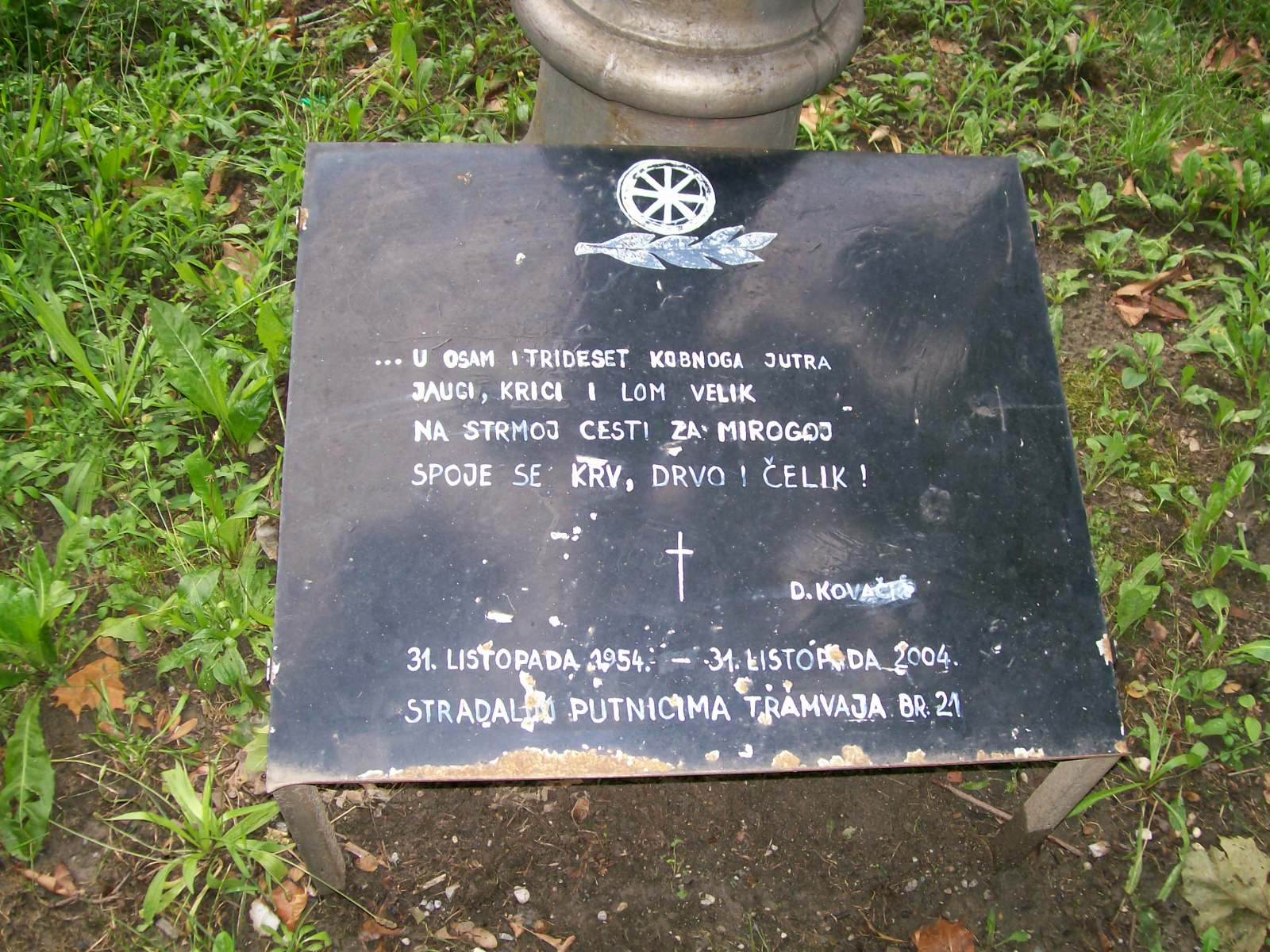
The memorial to passengers killed in the accident on Mirogoj Road

On 31 October 1954, in Zagreb, Croatia, a tram accident happened on Mirogoj Road, a steep road leading from Medveščak Street to Mirogoj Cemetery. A tram lost control during descent and crashed, killing 19 passengers, while 37 were injured, making this one of the worst tram accidents in the world.

== Events ==
This was not the first tram accident on the Mirogoj Road. Several tram derailments happened in the years prior to the 1954 accident. In 1952, seven people were killed.

At 8:30 in the morning, the M-24 tram left garage no. 21 traveling on line 13 which was, at the time, the relation between Mirogoj and Šoštarićeva Street (several hundred metres east of Ban Jelačić Square). The tram traveled downhill from Mirogoj towards the intersection Gupčeva Zvijezda. About 60 people had boarded the tram at Mirogoj, having been to the cemetery in preparation of All Saints' Day. The driver released the parking brake and started to descend the hill. Upon reaching the first curve, he attempted to apply the track brake to no effect. He then used the emergency brake, which releases sand onto the tracks in order to increase friction, but the tram was going too fast to stop. It continued to pick up speed until the last curve, near Gupčeva Zvijezda, where it derailed, rolled over and skidded 40 metres (130 ft) into a street light, uprooting and dragging along several trees in the process. The tram's speed was estimated at 80 km/h (50 mph), five times the speed limit.

People waiting for the tram at the nearby stop provided first aid, along with doctors and nurses from a nearby hospital, while stopped car and taxi drivers drove the injured to hospitals. The department for blood transfusion did not work on Sundays at the time, but opened to accept the tram passengers.

== Investigation and aftermath ==
During the investigation that followed, it was discovered that the tram was involved in another accident earlier that day, where it had hit a horse carriage, but later continued towards Mirogoj. A smaller-than-expected amount of sand was recovered on Mirogoj Road, which might have been due to the earlier accident.

Tram traffic was suspended indefinitely along Mirogoj Road as a result of the accident. It was reinstated in 1964, the trams equipped with four types of brakes this time, and suspended again on 15 May 1967 to be replaced with buses. The tracks were removed in 1970s.

== See also ==
- List of tram accidents
