= Tacoma streetcar disaster =

1900 streetcar accident in Washington State

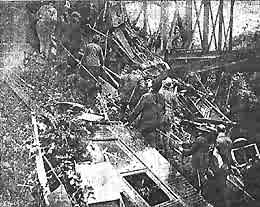
- Aftermath of the Tacoma streetcar disaster as it appeared in the July 5, 1900 Tacoma Daily Ledger

Details
- Coordinates: 47°12′N 122°24′W
- Country: United States
- Incident type: Streetcar derailment

Statistics
- Deaths: 43
- Injured: ~65

The Tacoma streetcar disaster was a public transportation accident that took place in Tacoma, Washington, on July 4, 1900 when an overloaded streetcar failed to negotiate a curve and plunged down an embankment near a trestle that spans today's South Tacoma Way. The accident resulted in 43 deaths and approximately 65 injuries, many serious.

== Background ==
Tacoma was served by several privately owned streetcar companies starting from 1888, and by 1900 there were lines running from the city center to several suburban areas, as well as up and down the steep hills in Tacoma's downtown area. One of the companies was Tacoma Railway & Power, which operated lines from Tacoma to Spanaway and from Tacoma to Steilacoom.

== Accident ==
The car involved in the accident originated at 8:00AM in the Edison neighborhood (now known as South Tacoma). The car was filled over capacity with people from outlying areas en route to Tacoma's 4th of July parade. Conditions were wet. As the car descended a hill down Delin Street towards a sharp curve, it became evident the motorman would not be able to slow down sufficiently, and passengers began to jump off. Near the intersection of South 26th and "C" Streets, where the tracks curved to the north onto a trestle, the car left the tracks and plunged over 100 feet (30 m) into a ravine.

Residents and bystanders in the area heard the crash and hurried to give aid. The carnage at the scene was described as horrific, with many victims trapped under the wreckage. Fatalities numbered 37 on the day of the accident, with 6 more dying of their injuries in the following days.

== Aftermath ==
The following day, an inquest was convened by the Pierce County Coroner. Ultimately, the accident was blamed on the motorman, F. L. Boehm, for allowing the car to reach excessive speed, with the jury also finding that Tacoma Railway and Power Company was criminally negligent for assigning Boehm to an unfamiliar route and for improper maintenance of its cars, rails, and the unsafe grade. Boehm testified that he might have been able to safely negotiate the curve, had the car not been overloaded. The Tacoma Railway and Power Company stopped using the trestle shortly thereafter and it was torn down in 1910.

== See also ==
- List of tram accidents
