= 1907 Birmingham Tramway accident =

Fatal tram accident on 1 October 1907 in Birmingham, England

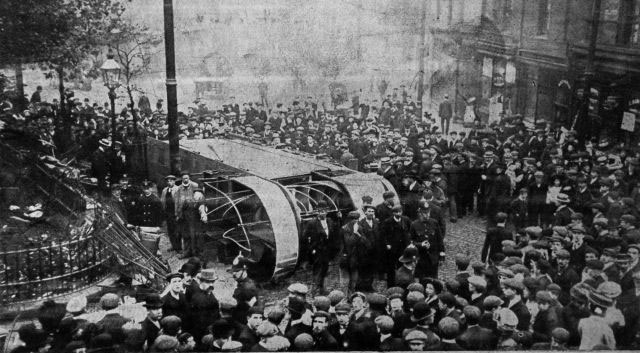

Details
- Date: 1 October 1907
- Location: Birmingham, England
- Coordinates: 52.4866°N 1.9181°W
- Country: England
- Operator: City of Birmingham Tramways Company Ltd
- Cause: Brake failure

Statistics
- Trains: 1
- Deaths: 2
- Injured: 17

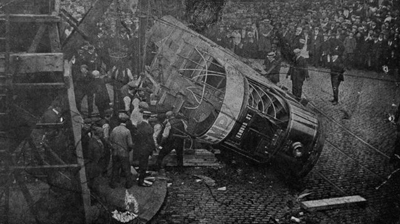
The overturned tram: from a contemporary postcard

The 1907 Birmingham Tramway accident was a fatal tram accident which occurred on 1 October 1907 in the city of Birmingham, England.

== Events ==
A tram operated by City of Birmingham Tramways Company Ltd was going downhill on Warstone Lane in the Jewellery Quarter area of the city when its brakes failed and it ran away. At the junction of Warstone Lane and Icknield Street it overturned at high speed and skidded until it stopped on the other side of the street, smashing into the pavement. Two people died and 17 were injured. It is the deadliest tram accident in the area covered by the modern West Midlands county. The tram's brakes were later found to have been faulty.

The coroner's inquest heard that the driver had, shortly after leaving the depot, discovered that the magnetic brake was not working correctly, and so controlled the tram using the hand brake until a reversing point - the brake acting as it should from the opposite end. Upon reaching the terminus he reported the defect to an inspector and asked him to meet the tram on the return journey when the tram would again be being driven from the problematic end. The inspector boarded the tram at the top of the hill and attempted to use the magnetic brake to control the descent as usual, but encountered the same problems as the driver. By the time they applied the hand brake it was too late to avoid the accident.

A Board of Trade enquiry was held by H.A. Yorke, it found that that immediate cause was the actions of the inspector in taking the tramcar down the hill with a defective magnetic brake and experimenting with that brake on an incline.

== See also ==
- List of tram accidents
