= Košice Amphitheatre =

Amphitheatre in Slovakia

- Amfiteáter Košice
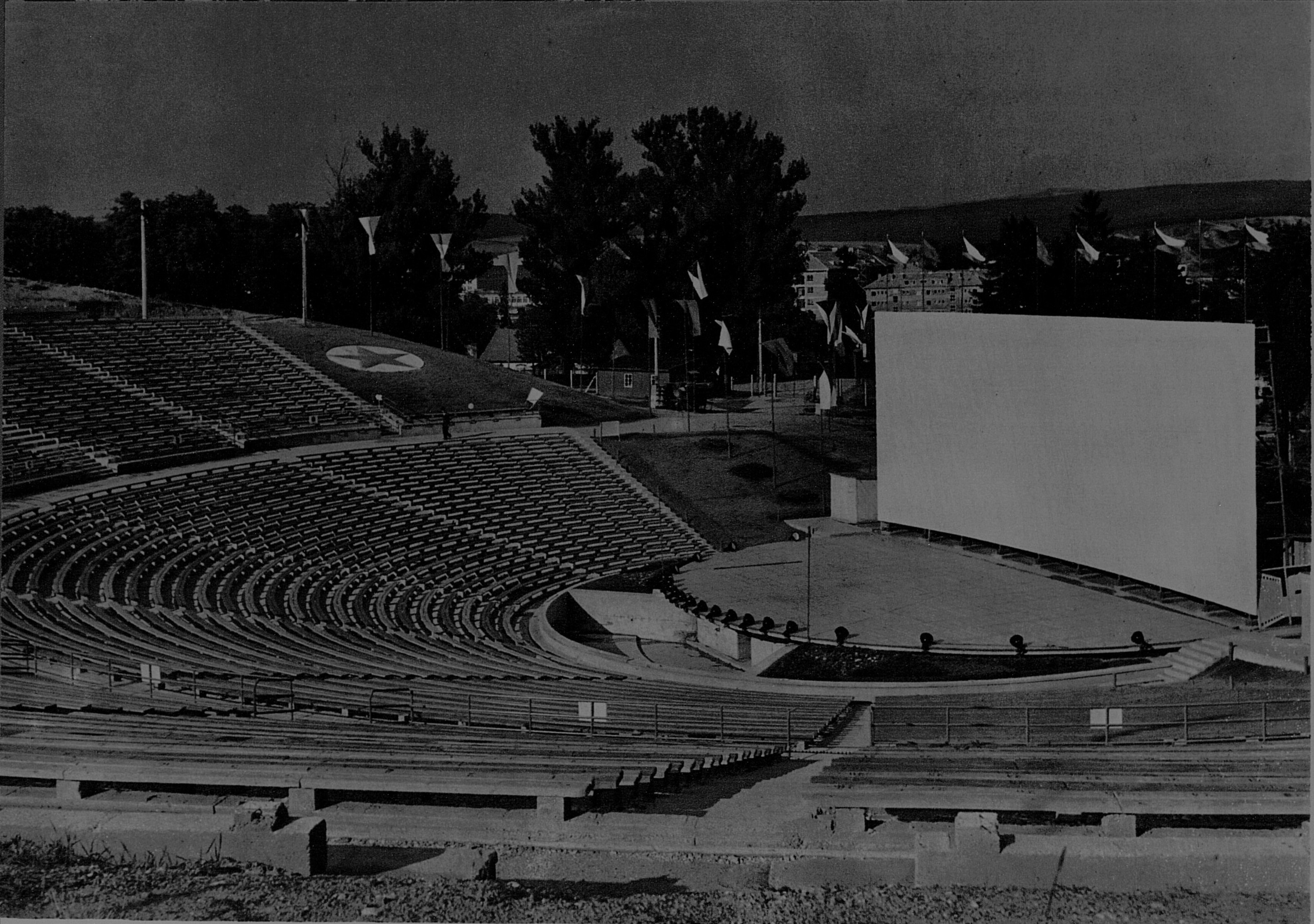
- The amphitheatre in 1959
- Interactive map of the Košice Amphitheatre area

General information
- Location: Košice, Slovakia
- Coordinates: 48.727177°N 21.238461°E

Other information
- Seating capacity: 5,000

The Košice Amphitheater (Slovak: Amfiteáter Košice) is an open-air theatre in Košice, in the Sever district of the city, at Festival Square No. 2. Despite its name, it only has one semi-circle of seating and so is modelled on an ancient Greek theatre rather than a Roman amphitheatre.

== History ==
Its location was proposed in 1954 on the eastern slope of the Kalvária hill. The construction began with earthworks by the Civil Engineering Department in 1955, and the construction itself, as part of the "Z" campaign, began on its own in 1956, in which students from 20 secondary vocational schools and institutions participated, and all the major construction companies in the city. Its entrance was to be from the back, and thus a road bypass and the entire Festival Square were created. The entire construction was originally divided into 4 stages, but in the end there were two stages, the 1st stage was completed in 1959 and the second stage took place in 1963 - 1966. In the second stage, sanitary facilities and final landscaping were completed. The first mention of the final approval in the city archives is from 1963, when its "capable parts" were put into use. The construction of the EKRAN building, behind the projection screen, where the changing rooms for performers and the restaurant and offices of the Park of Culture and Leisure were to be located, was postponed until 1968.

With its seating capacity of 25,000 and the dimensions of the largest projection screen, its design by Ing. arch Gabrini and Ing. arch V. Malinovský and subsequent construction was one of the largest in Czechoslovakia. The first summer screening dates back to 1965 as part of the "Workers' Film Festival", which after years moved to it from the city cinemas. On Saturday, June 19, 1965, the premiere of the "Oscar" film of the city of Sabinov, The Shop on Main Street, was held. The screening was attended by 20,000 spectators. From 1995, the building was managed by the Košice North Local Authority until August 1, 2012, when reconstruction began as part of the investment projects Košice - European Capital of Culture 2013, which ended on December 28, 2012. The building was then managed by the Košice City Hall. From January 1, 2014, it came under the management of the newly established contributory organization of the city of Košice "K13 - Košice Cultural Centers" with its registered office at Kukučínová Street No. 2, in the new Kulturpark.
