= Barnsley and District Tramway =

Electric tramway network serving the town of Barnsley, South Yorkshire

Coordinates: 53.553°N 1.481°W

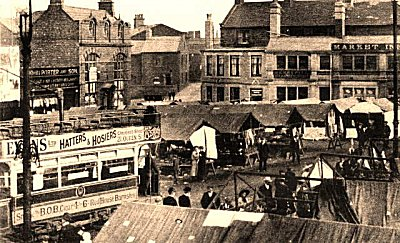
- An inbound Barnsley tram on May Day Green in 1902

Overview
- Headquarters: Barnsley
- Locale: England
- Dates of operation: 1902–1930
- Successor: Abandoned

Technical
- Track gauge: 4 ft 8 1/2 in (1,435 mm)

The Barnsley and District Electric Traction Co. was an electric tramway network serving the town of Barnsley, South Yorkshire.

The company was a subsidiary of British Electric Traction, and services began on 31 October 1902. In early 1898, three companies had applied for local tramway systems; the Barnsley Corporation applied in 1900 for a larger network than it finally built. In 1913, the company began to run motor buses to Hoyland and other points. "Electric" was dropped from the company name in 1919. The Barnsley company changed its name to Yorkshire Traction Co. (YTC) in 1928 and abandoned tramway operation in 1930.

Excluding Oxford and Bristol, YTC is the largest bus operator to have originated from a tramway company in England.

== The network ==
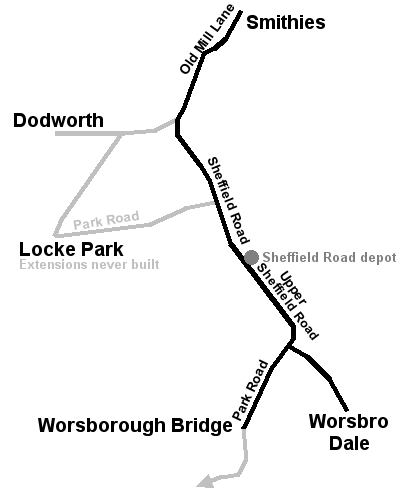
The Barnsley and District tramway network in 1925.

The Barnsley electric tramway was a standard-gauge 4 ft 8 1/2 in (1,435 mm) line, running from Smithies (near Monk Bretton Colliery), 2 miles south of Barnsley town centre, to two termini, at Worsbrough Bridge and Worsbough Dale, with a junction at the crossroads of Upper Sheffield Road and Kingwell Road at the Cutting End by the present day Cutting Edge public house. The line ran from the level crossing on Old Mill Lane, down the Barnsley town centre to Sheffield Road and split into two branches down Park Road (Worsbrough) and High Street. At the road junction south of Market Place, the left fork was occupied by the Dearne District. Both networks were virtually next to each other at this point, but they never connected.

=== Extensions ===
The Barnsley tramway was intended to be larger than it actually was, but the Great Central Railway (GCR) company refused to allow the passing of tramway tracks over its own network, and prevented authorised lines from being built. One of these lines would have extended the tramway away from Barnsley towards Carlton Road to the north. Other lines would have extended the tramway into a loop on Park Road (Barnsley) in Locke Park and south from Worsborough Bridge down Park Road (Worsbrough) to Hoyland Common; this extension was also blocked by the GCR.

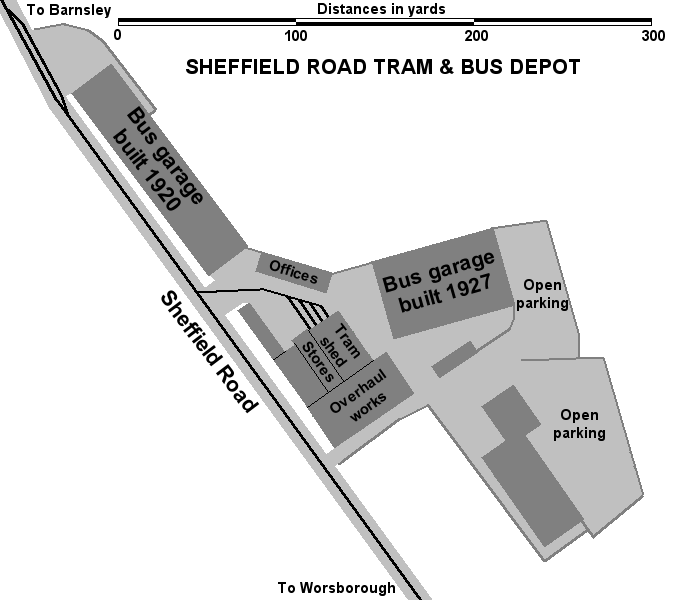
Barnsley trams' Sheffield Rd depot.

== Tram depots ==
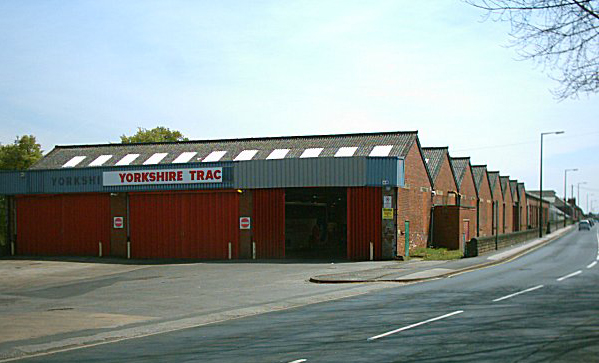
A view of the 1920 bus depot

=== Sheffield Road shed ===
The shed stood next to the 1920s bus garage of the same company to the south of Barnsley town centre. The shed had four running tracks and an extensive yard. Overhaul workshops were situated to the back of the shed.

At the end of tramway operations the depot became a bus depot exclusively, passing to Stagecoach Yorkshire and finally closing for housing development on 20 October 2008. Demolition work started in April 2009.

Very little of the system survives today apart from a few sawn off overhead wire poles in the cutting of Upper Sheffield Road and the occasional piece of track unearthed during roadworks.

== Rolling stock ==
The Barnsley & District used two types of vehicle:

- 13 four-wheeled double-deck tramcars.
- 1 demi-car.
