= Milan tram derailment =

Derailment of an Italian tram in 2026

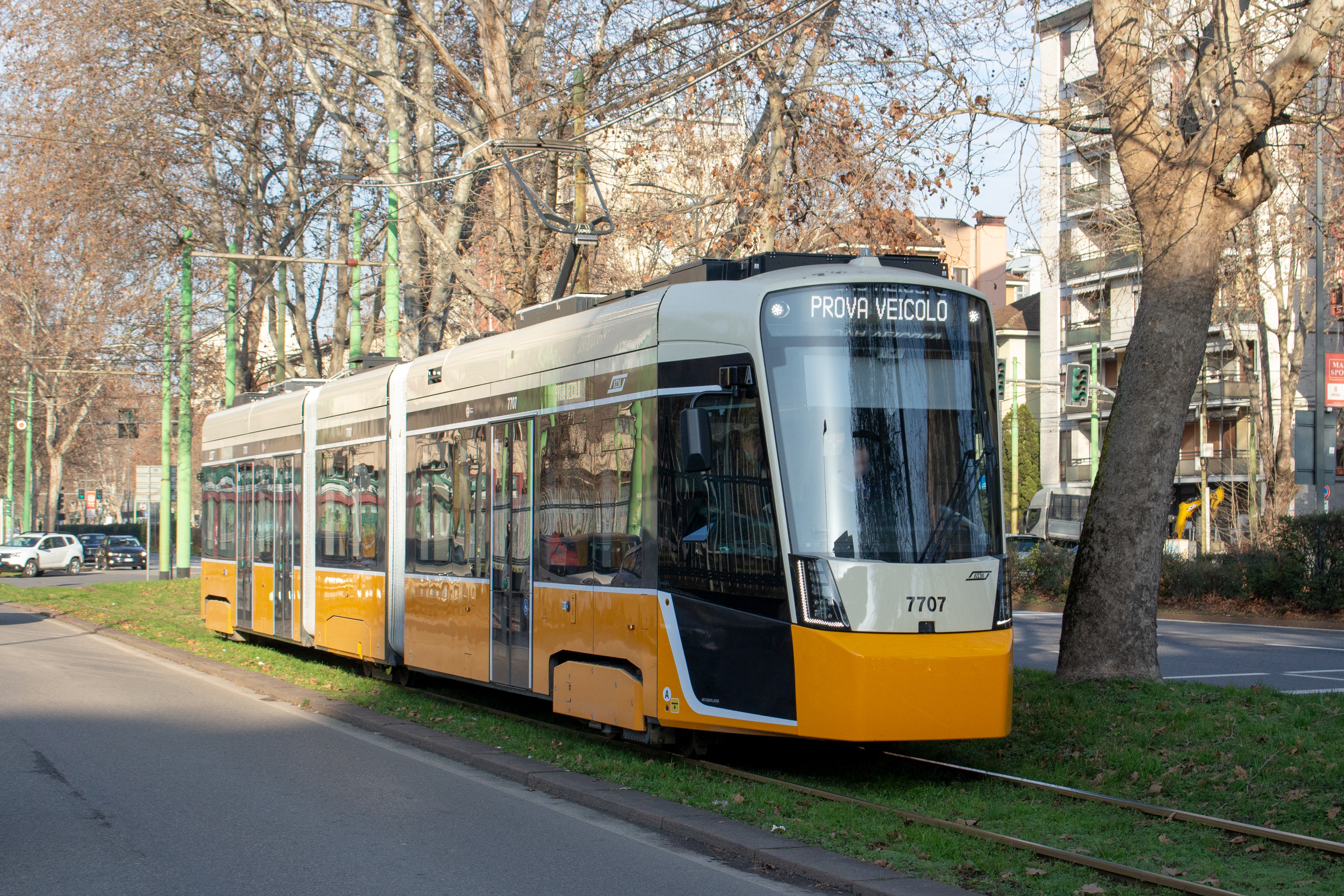
- A Stadler Tramlink in Milan

Details
- Date: February 27, 2026; 16:00 (local)
- Location: Milan
- Country: Italy
- Line: 9
- Operator: ATM
- Incident type: Derailment, collision with building

Statistics
- Trains: One Tramlink
- Deaths: 2
- Injured: 54

On February 27, 2026, a tram derailed in the center of Milan, Italy, killing two people and injuring 54 others, including some seriously. The state-of-the-art tram was traveling full on line 9, on Viale Vittorio Veneto, at around 4 p.m. local time when it derailed and collided with a building.

== Accident ==
The three-car tram, one of the newest bidirectional Tramlink models with driver cabins at each end, recently in operation in Milan, left the tracks on Via Vittorio Veneto, near the city's Central Station, colliding with a shop window. The tram was traveling between Piazza Repubblica and Porta Venezia and upon reaching the intersection with Via Lazzaretto, it should have continued straight, but it left the tracks and made a left turn. The driver lost control of the vehicle, which crashed into a building, knocking down a traffic light and breaking a restaurant window.

=== Victims ===
Two people were killed and 54 more injured. The fatalities were Ferdinando Favia, a 59-year-old Italian man, and Okon Johnson Lucky, a 49-year-old man from Nigeria.

== Consequences ==
The accident occurred at a time when the city was packed with international visitors, celebrities, and journalists for Milan Fashion Week and in the interval between the Winter Olympics and the Paralympic Games.

== Investigation ==
The initial investigation focused on the condition of driver, who tested negative for alcohol and drugs but reported feeling ill while driving. It was also reported that the driver skipped a stop and failed to operate a track switch, routing the tram onto curved rather than straight track.
