= Tram accident =

Accident involving a tramway

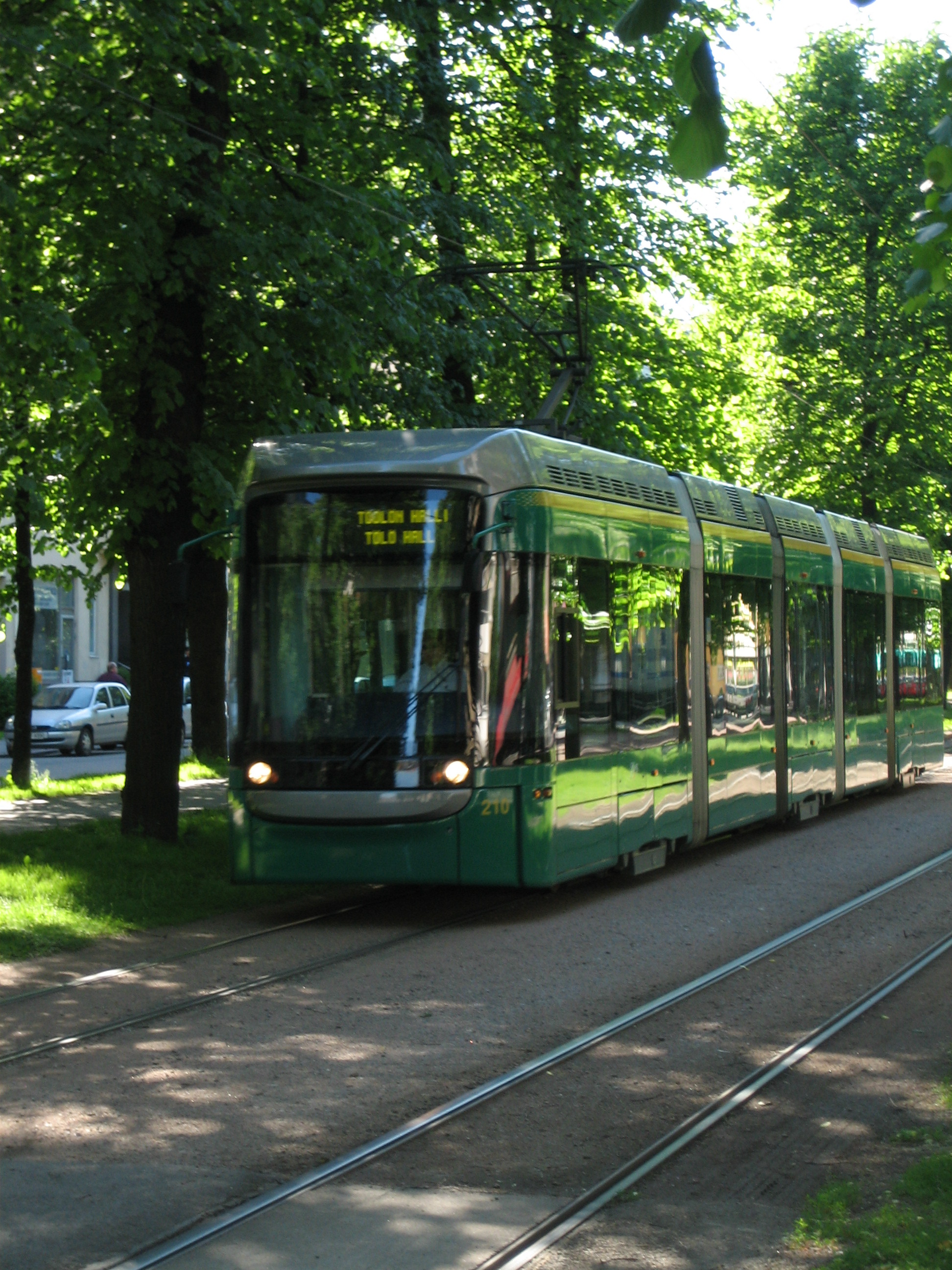
A tram running on tracks isolated from vehicle lanes in Helsinki, Finland.

A tram accident is any accident involving a tram or tram system.

Though tram systems can be environmentally friendly, efficient, and cost effective methods of transport within urban areas, issues such as poor maneuverability and long braking distances also pose public safety concerns. Research indicates that for each kilometer traveled, trams are 12 times more likely to be involved in a serious accident than a car.

== Types of accidents ==
=== Tram derailments and collisions ===
Tram derailments are often caused by damaged track, collisions with obstacles such as other vehicles or pedestrians, junction failures, or excessive speed at a junction or curve. Additionally, collisions may occur between trams due to faulty junctions or poor driving.

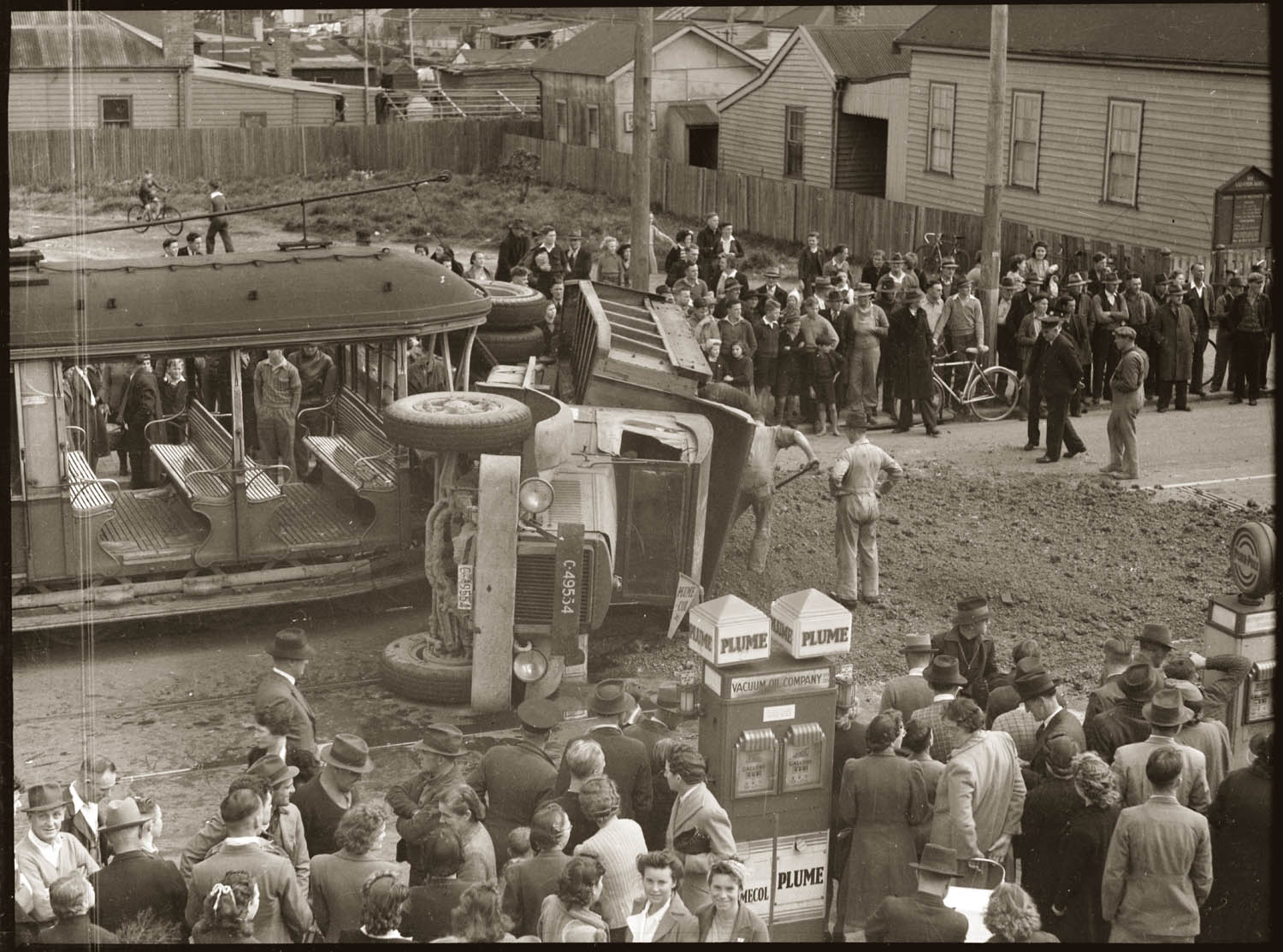
Collision between truck and tram on Sydney's original tram network

=== Passenger accidents ===
Trams coming to a sudden stop may cause injuries to passengers on board. Passengers may also slip, trip or fall on the tram or the tram platform. Blind passengers may particularly be at risk of falling off a tram or getting injured by closing doors. In areas of overcrowded tram systems, illegal passengers are in danger of falling off or being trapped between tram cars. Fire aboard a tram puts passengers at risk of severe injury or death.

Additionally, passengers may be struck by a car while exiting the tram or while waiting at a tram platform. Such incidents are also taken into account during tram public safety studies.

=== Pedestrians and cyclists ===
While collisions with cars are the most common form of tram accident, cyclists and pedestrians are the group most at risk of death during tram collisions. Cyclists may experience a loss of control if bicycle tires get jammed in tramway tracks. More rarely, members of the public may also climb over a tram car, or in other ways get in contact with the electric conductors or other electric appliances of a tram, and receive an electric shock.

The mortality of pedestrians hit by a tram seems to be much higher than the mortality of pedestrians hit by a motor vehicle. Typically most seriously injured people have been caught under or between tramcars. Non-impact absorbing parts at the side of the trams may lead to serious head injuries even at low speeds.

== Accident analysis ==
In some countries accident investigation boards investigate all rail accidents and hazardous situations that may have led to a serious accident. These investigations are detailed analysis on the causes and consequences of the accidents. Investigations create information and recommendations to prevent further accidents. The investigations can be required by law with systematic guides determining minimum requirements for an analysis. In addition, rail accident investigations can analyze previous occurrences of a similar character.

Some national authorities keep statistics on tramway incidents. An example of an authority collecting accident and incident reports from national authorities is the European Railway Agency, which keeps a public safety database on railway licences, certificates, safety indicators, national safety rules, and accident investigations. In the European Union, the safety of railways has been regulated with directives, which also require the collection of common safety indicator statistics from member countries. In the EU, common safety methods (CSMs) and common safety targets (CSTs) have been set for European railways.

== Safety measures ==
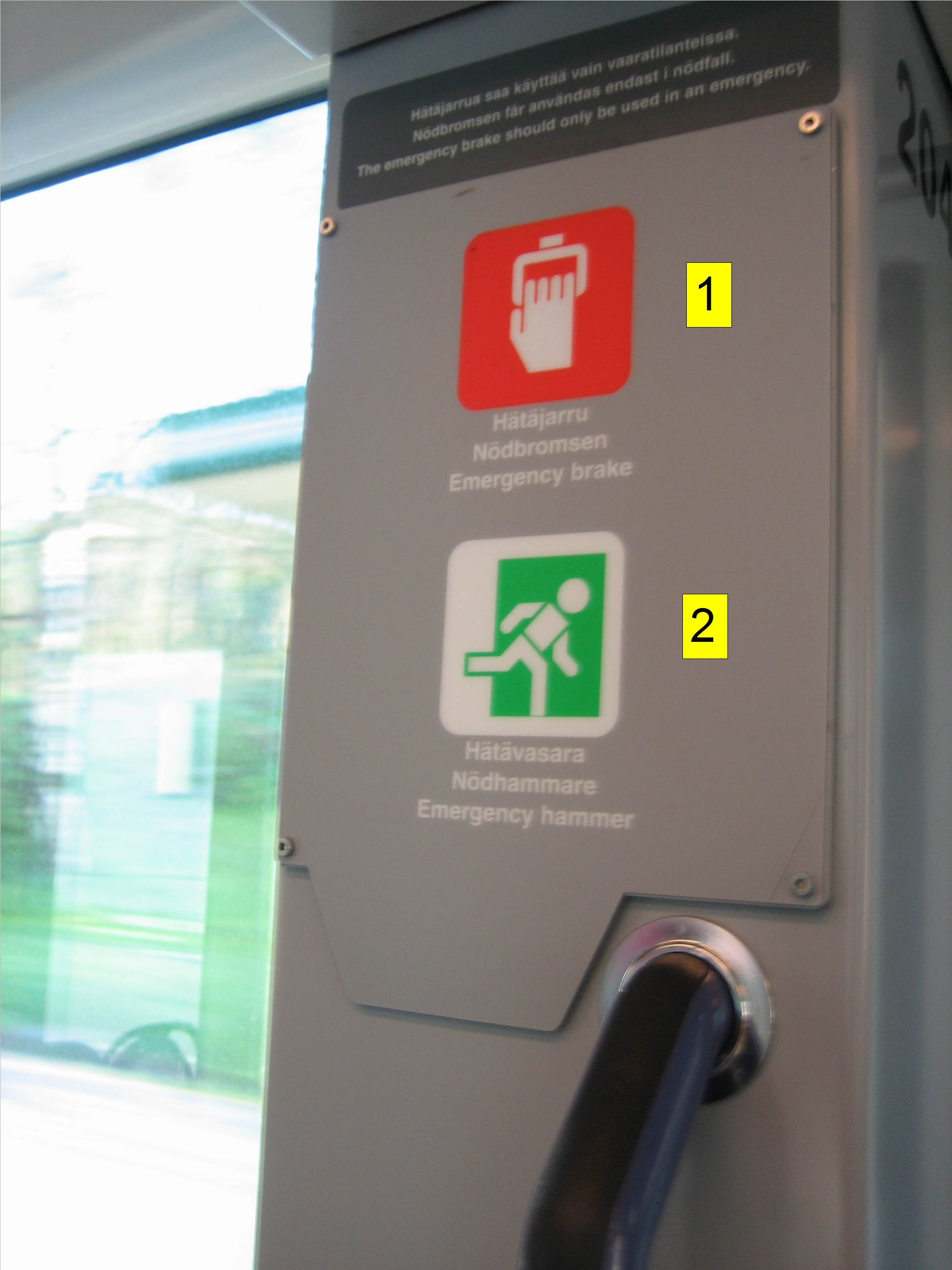
Emergency brake and emergency hammer near a tram door.

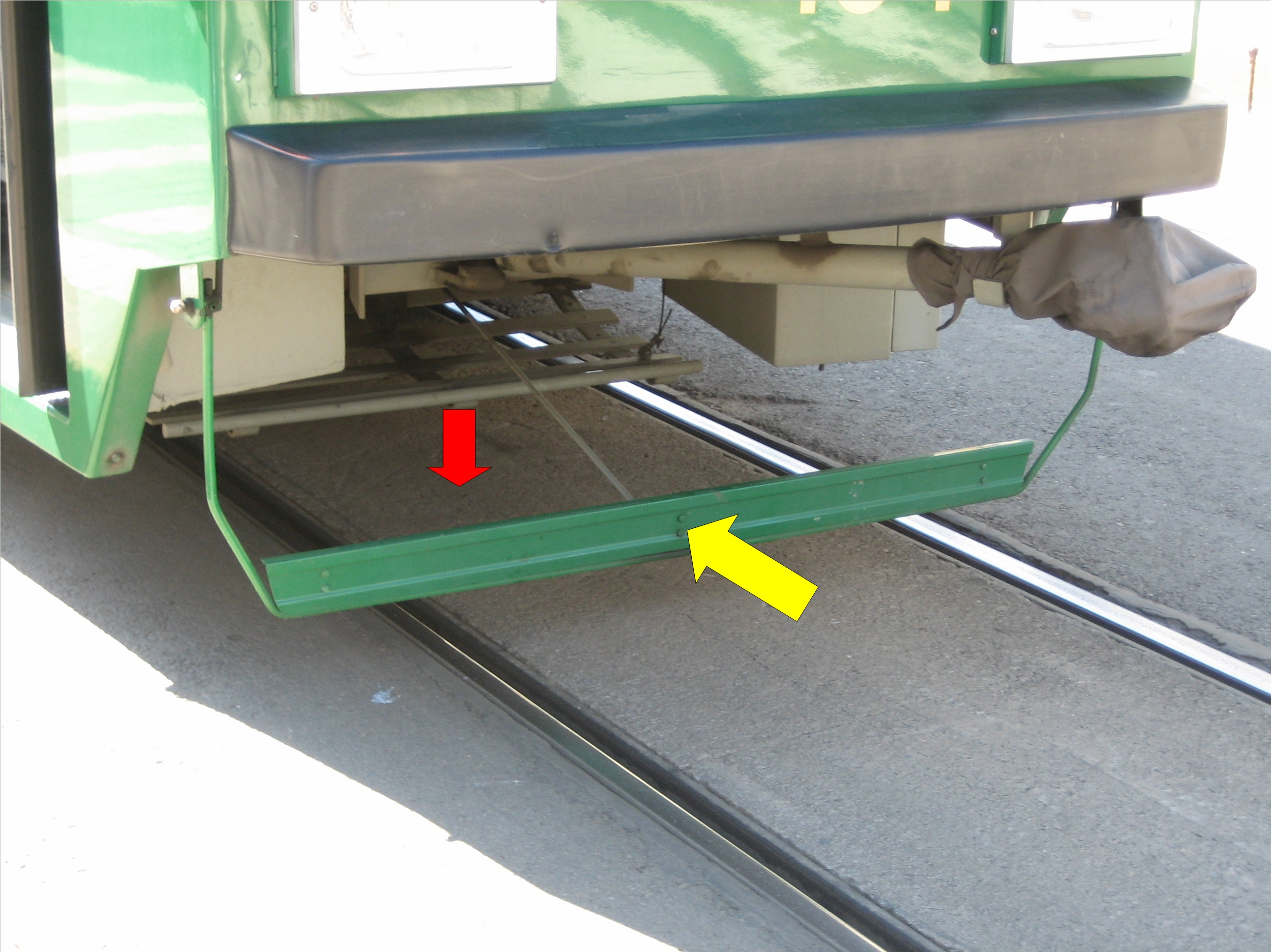
A protective shield in front of a tram. When a person hits the detector (yellow arrow), a shield (red arrow) is launched which prevents the person from getting under the wheels.

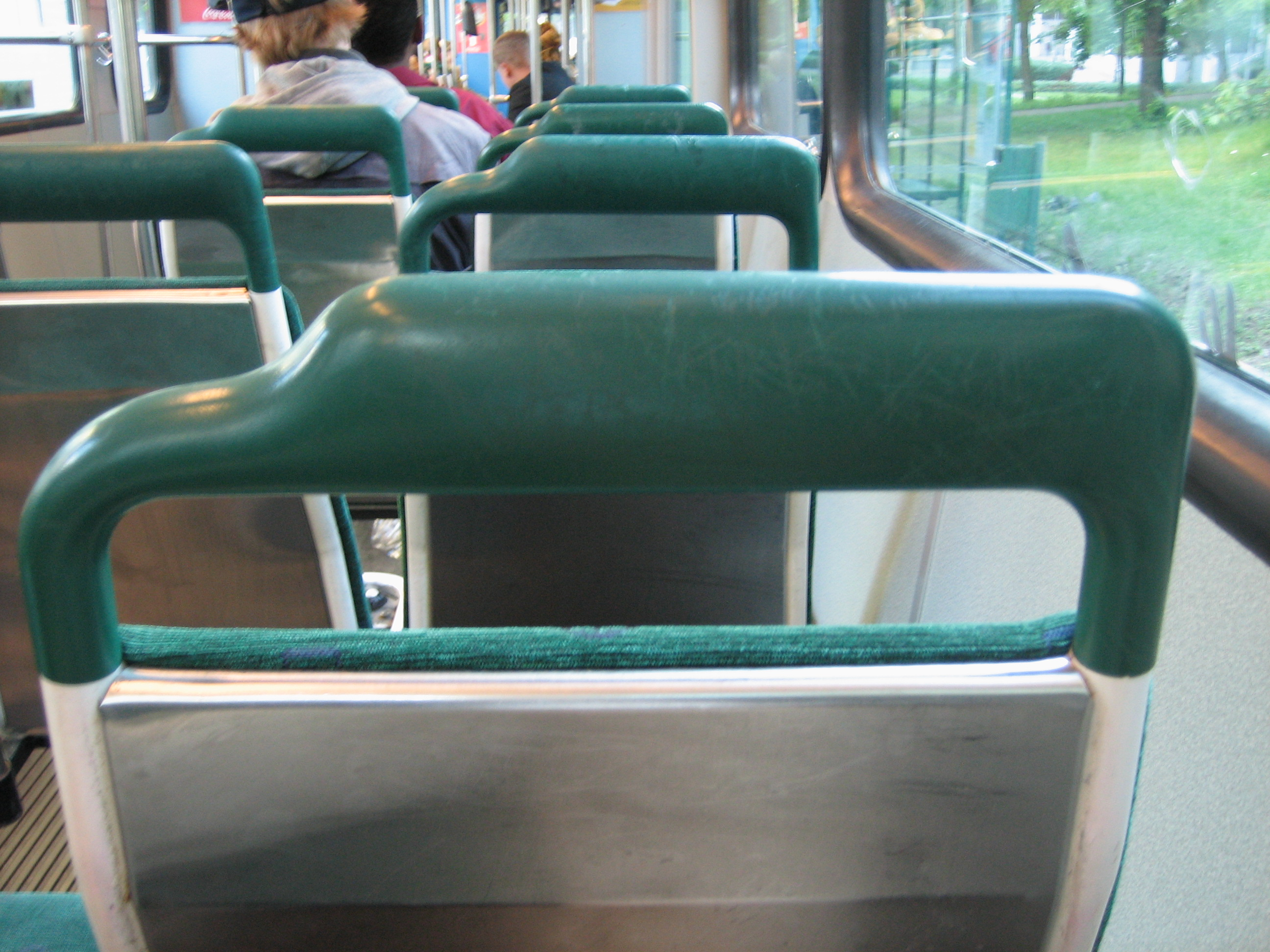
Fireproof, round shaped, flexible and/or impact absorbing materials are used in the tram interiors.

=== Tram stops ===
When evaluating general traffic safety, the safety of tram lines and train and tram crossings are given particular attention. Some cities or areas have systemically developed new safety systems and planned new, safer tram stops. These measures have included accessible tram stops, safety staff, road-based improvements like speed humps near tram stops, better lighting of tram stops, raised dividing strips to separate trams and motorists, traffic light sequence changes, speed limit changes near tram stops, and electronic flashing "give way to trams" signs to warn other traffic in places where necessary. Tram stops have also been separated with barriers from the street in some locations.

=== Tram design ===
Structural design of trams can minimize the risks to tram drivers, tram passengers, pedestrians, and passengers in other vehicles in various kinds of tram-to-tram, tram-to-vehicle, and tram-to-pedestrian collisions.

For example, some trams contain emergency brakes for passengers to access. Both icy winters and falling leaves pose a threat by making the rails more slippery. Therefore, some trams are also able to drop sand on the rails to increase the friction during emergency braking. A brush car can be used to clear the rails.

Automatic door controlling sensors also decrease the possibility of entrapment injuries. In Toronto, the CLRV streetcars have a skirt added to the front of the car covering the coupler to prevent passengers from being dragged under the car's wheels. Common safety features onboard tram often include driver's vigilance control systems and programmable logic speed controllers. A tram also typically carries first aid kit, a radio and/or a phone, some tools, and a fire extinguisher.

=== Tram control centres ===
A quality system may guide the safety of a tram system. A tram system may have a control centre following the trams, having radio contact with the drivers, and ability to contact and guide guards, emergency dispatch centre, or repair patrols.

=== Education ===
==== Tram drivers ====
Basic first aid, safety courses, and protocols to follow in an accident are taught to tram drivers. Some organizations test the drivers for alcohol and/or drugs regularly to avoid driving under the influence. The health of the drivers may also be assessed regularly or in case of need. Some organizations also give education to drivers and re-evaluate their skills and manners periodically.

==== Rescue teams ====
Rescue organizations are also informed on tram structures, electricity, risks, and specific rescue and firefighting tactics concerning trams. Rescue organizations may also train with trams in simulated accident and firefighting situations.

==== General public ====
Various cities and traffic companies have given safety and traffic instructions for passengers, pedestrian, wheelchair users, cyclists, and motorists. These instructions tell how to behave in traffic to avoid accidents. For example, the instructions advise not to obstruct the tramway, suggest motorists avoid driving directly on the track, and tell the pedestrians to use designated crossways and to look both ways before crossing the tracks. Local tram regulations may give requirements for the passengers not to carry flammable, soiling, or destructive chemicals or space-blocking packages in trams. Enlightenment of children and adults have also been done by using games and tests.

== Accident protocol ==
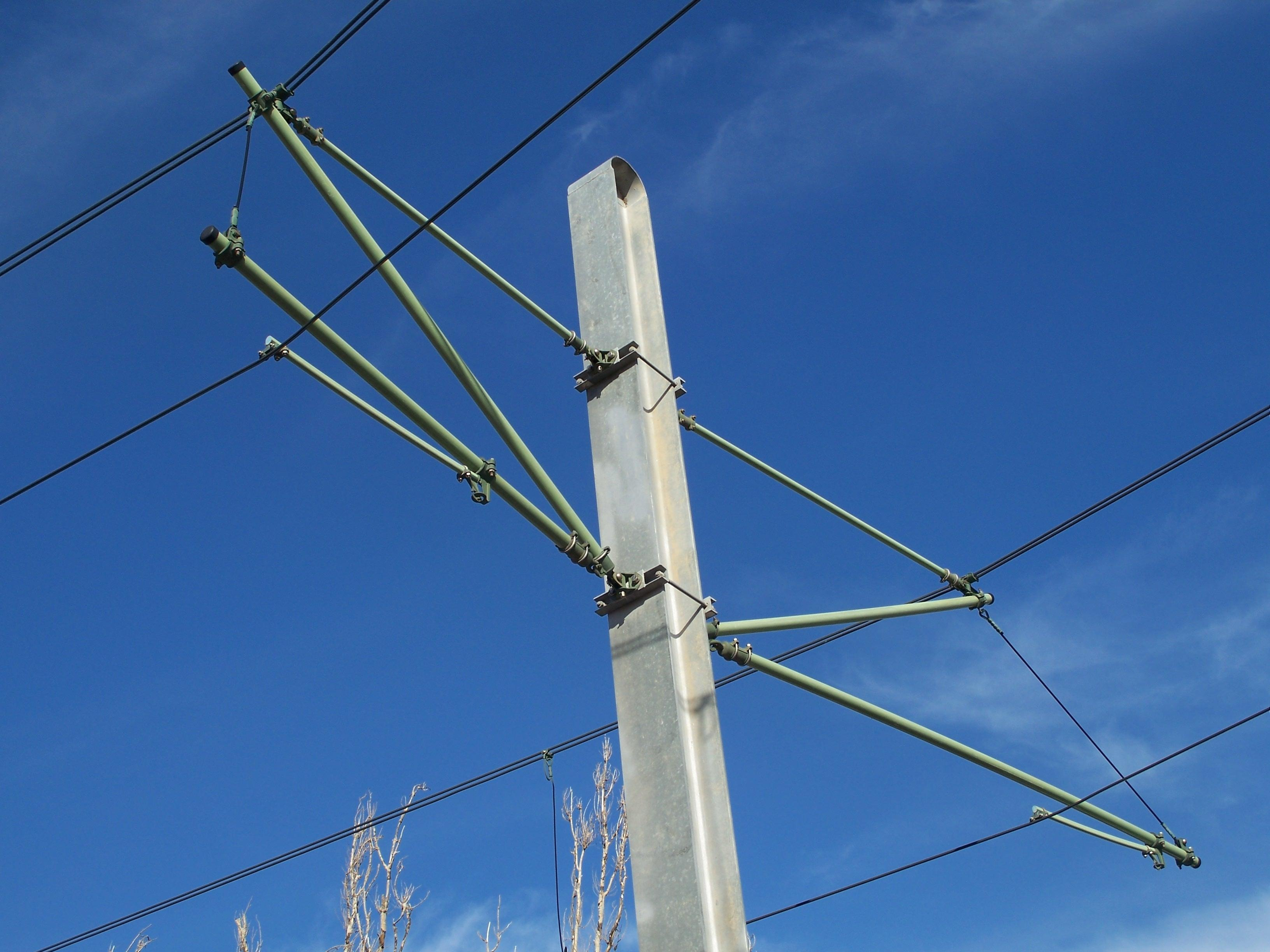
Overhead wires used to power trams in Athens.

Emergency dispatch centres have strategies and emergency response guides prepared for various kinds of tram accidents. These response guides can contain information on what emergency response units (police, ambulance, fire apparatus, investigation units etc.) are sent to the accident scene in various kind of accidents (fire, derailment, collision, pedestrian hit by a tram etc.).

At the accident scene, a ground connection is used to prevent electric shocks from overhead lines. The accident scene is surveyed, and in the case of several injured persons, a triage process or other recognition of patients' states is done. The most critically injured patients are the first to receive attention and treatment. Hospitals can also be alerted in major accidents.

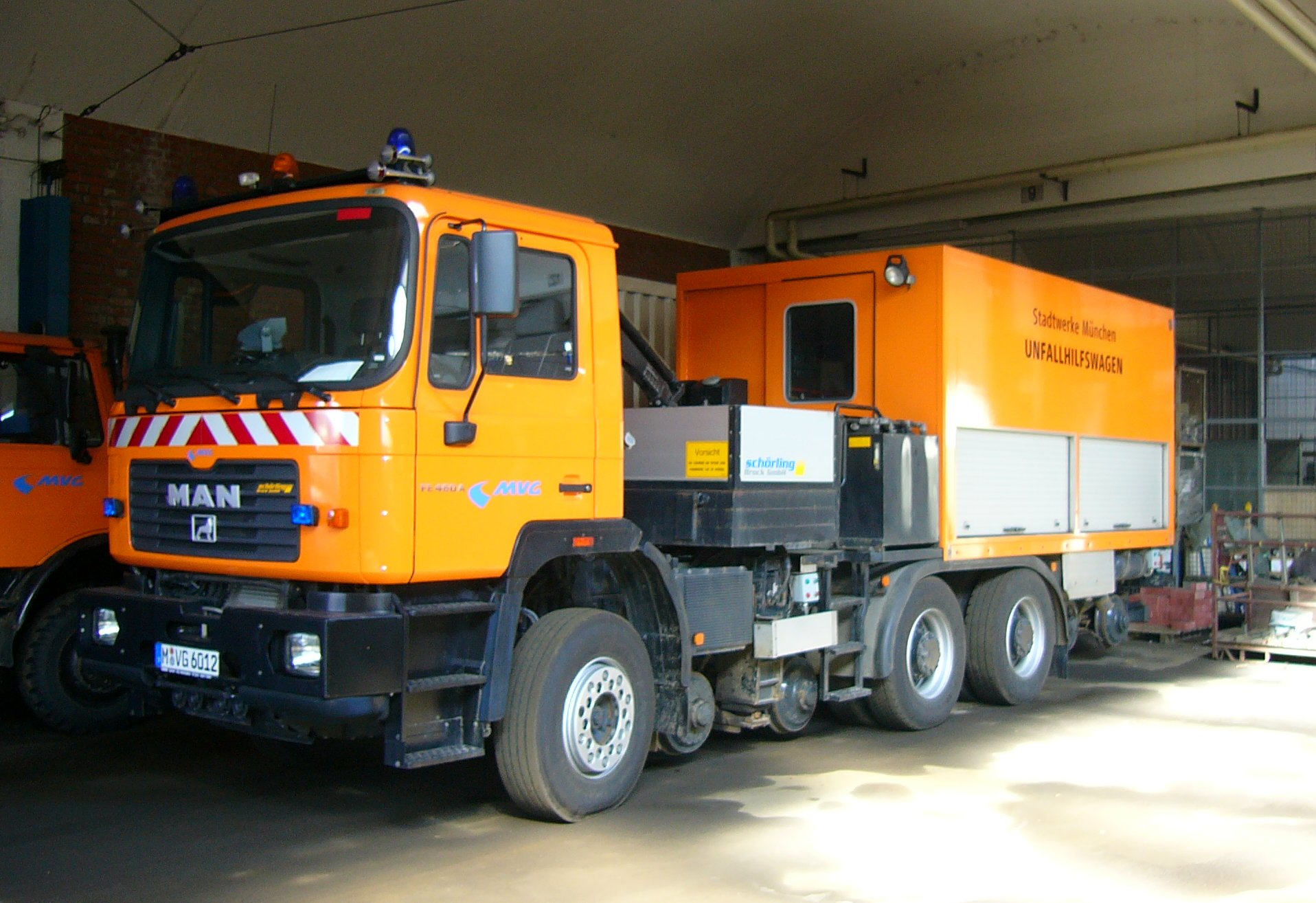
A MAN truck with crane and drawbar for pulling, rerailing, and shunting trams in Munich, Germany.

In the case of someone underneath a tram, lifting bags or hydraulic jacks brought by fire brigades can be used to elevate the tram and release anyone trapped under the vehicle. A crane can also be used to lift a tram or an overturned tram. If a patient is trapped inside crushed structures, various kinds of extrication tools, like hydraulic spreaders, rams, cutters, and circular saws can be used. In some cases, it is also possible to drive the tram backwards, but in most cases this would only cause more injuries to the victim. While cutting, lifting or turning an overturned tram or vehicle, structures often have to be stabilized to mitigate the risk of moving parts, and to secure suspended vehicles or objects.

Cranes, tow trucks, hydraulic jacks and rollers can be used to rerail a derailed tram vehicle.

After the patients have been treated and transported, police inquiries may take place. After a full inspection, the vehicles involved may be allowed to leave the scene. In severe accidents, special traffic or accident investigation boards may analyze the accident and its consequences, and give recommendations to improve safety in traffic. After the accident, the tram, the tracks and the overhead lines may also need repair.

== See also ==
- List of tram accidents
- Tram
- Tram stop
- Tramway track
- Derailment
- Street running
