= Segerstedt =

Segerstedt is a Swedish surname. It may refer to:

- Amy Segerstedt (1835–1928), Swedish teacher and philanthropist, founder of the Braille Loan Library in Stockholm
- Erik Segerstedt (born 1983), Swedish singer
- Torgny Segerstedt (1876–1945), Swedish scholar of comparative religion and newspaper editor-in-chief
  - Torgny T:son Segerstedt (1908–1999), son of Torgny Segerstedt, Swedish philosopher and sociologist
  - Ingrid Segerstedt Wiberg (1911–2010), daughter of Torgny Segerstedt, Swedish journalist and politician
