= Torsten Billman =

Swedish artist (1909–1989)

Torsten Edvard Billman (6 May 1909 – 6 April 1989) was a Swedish artist who worked as a printmaker, illustrator, and buon fresco painter. He counts as one of the 20th century's premier wood-engravers.

The poet Gunnar Ekelöf wrote about Torsten Billman: "To those, who with the word art visualise large, magnificent, 'striking' canvases Torsten Billman doesn't have not much to offer. His art serves the simple, neglected, homeless of existence. It features the fellows from the Nippon and other ships, marked by the hard life in ports as well as on board. His art shows the interiors of East End bars, where you get acquainted with the dark side of life. His art however isn't any 'social' art of the arrogant, placarding character there was so much of especially during the 1920s and 30s. It's social, not in attitude or trend, but with objectivity and revealing sharpness in the human portrayal that sometimes seems almost brutal – repulsive, but sadly true. Yet it's, however always carried by compassion. Never by sentimentality. This involves a simple statement of: 'Such is man'. But from the ravaged features, and the gout-ridden limbs stiff from work there's still a notion emanating of how man should look like and could look like."

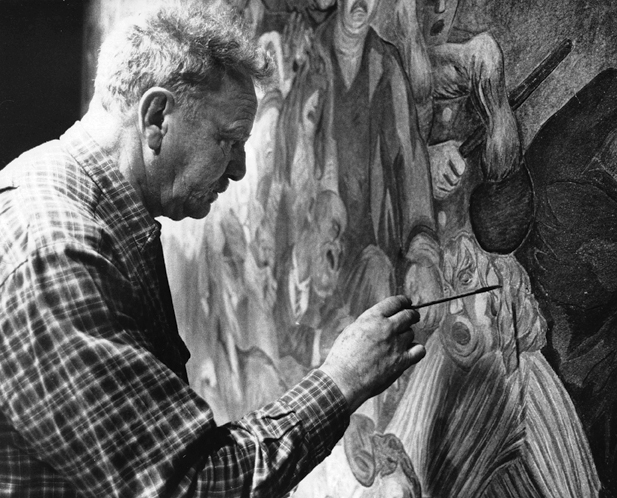
Torsten Billman restoring his buon fresco Development of Society (1947) in Gävle, 1983

== Biography ==
=== Early years ===
Born in Kullavik, Sweden, Torsten Billman disliked school, with the drawing lessons as the only exception. During a drawing lesson with a substitute teacher Torsten had on a piece of blotting paper drawn a detailed composition, which was supposed to represent an Indian with his tent and utensils. "After the teacher had inspected the pictures produced by the class, Torsten was called to his desk. He expected a sympathetic judgment from the teacher; yes, he also hoped that he might impress a certain girl in the class. So he stepped forward fearlessly. He had hardly reached the plattform when he received such a box on the ear that he fell to the floor. As he crestfallen rose to return to his own desk he was further rebuked by the teacher, who ordered him immediately to fling the drawing in the red-hot stove." "It was my first vernissage", said Torsten Billman.

His father, Frans Ludwig Billman (1862–1930), was born in Berg' parish near Billingen. Here, Torsten Billman's grandfather had worn himself out in the hell of a crofter's holding. Torsten's mother Maria (1870–1953), born Hultgren, came from Skövde. Both parents had grown up under very poor conditions in Västergötland. Frans Billman's great talent for tailoring allowed him, despite only 14 days of elementary school, go to Copenhagen and London to train himself to become a fine tailor. In the 1890s Frans and Maria moved to workingclass suburb Haga, Gothenburg. In 1909 they moved, with their three-year-old daughter Ingegerd (b. 1906), to Kullavik (south of Gothenburg). In Kullavik Frans Billman opened his own tailor shop. Frans wished that Torsten also should become a tailor; so Torsten's artistic interest lay dormant after he finished school in 1924. Torsten also understood that the father got fewer and fewer customers, as more and more hand-tailors in the mid-1920s were knocked out by the expanding clothing industry. Torsten had no desire to become a tailor. What he looked for was both freedom and contact with human beings, work communion.

=== Years at sea ===
Billman was 17 years old when he in Stockholm, 1926, signed on SS Valencia; a cargo-boat plying the Mediterranean. He first worked as a deckhand; too young to sign up for a job in the engine department (under 18 years old). In 1927 he became a coal trimmer. His artistic awakening was on SS Nippon, in 1928, a bigger long-distance runner plying the Far East. With white school chalk he drew caricatures of his fellow seamen and officers on the soot-blackened walls and bulkheads of the stokehole. Drawings that evoked encouragement from the men in the forecastle and also from the officers. "That ship put my slumbering pictoral talent in motion. I documented and I stored images – this I understood afterwards", Billman recalls. After the next ship SS Nordic, early in 1929, he told his sister, Ingegerd, that he wanted to become an artist. He worked on five different merchant ships 1926–1929 and 1932 as a deckhand (1926–27), coal trimmer and stoker.

=== First woodcut ===
Torsten Billman's cousin on his mother's side Nils Svahn (1890–1936) was an editorial cartoonist at the newspaper Social-Demokraten, in Stockholm 1920–29. During Torsten's visit in Stockholm in the autumn of 1929, Nils explained a little about the woodcut for Torsten. Returned to Kullavik from military service in the Navy in Karlskrona, as a stoker on HSwMS Sverige 1929–1930, he made his first woodcuts Hands (1930) and Thirst (1930) as an unemployed stoker. Billman had not been to any art museum or anything like that and he know nothing about woodcut technique, so his first wood engravings was cut out of the wood of a margarine case with an ordinary carpenter's knife. Artistically he was "the complete savage", but he became interested when he saw reproductions of Frans Masereel and Käthe Kollwitz and when he later saw lithographs by Honoré Daumier it was a stirring experience for him.

=== Images to union magazine ===
Torsten Billman's first published images (an ink drawing) was published in the November 1930 issue of the union magazine Eldaren (The Stoker). He also made a few covers for the union magazine Sjömannen (The Sailor). His very last work of art was the Christmas 1988 issue cover.

=== Art studies ===
Upon the recommendation of a German woman in Kullavik he gained admittance in 1931 to The Industrial Arts School in Gothenburg, with Hjalmar Eldh as a teacher. Billman studied book illustration at the school. A good example of woodcut making from this period is A Fiddlers Burial (1931), inspired by a poem from collection of verse Black Ballades by the Swedish poet Dan Andersson. He also made five linoleum cuts (linocut) with which he illustrated Upton Sinclair's novel Jimmie Higgins (unpublished illustrations). A sympathy for the little fellow and the underprivileged is a pervading characteristic of all his graphic work from that time on.

When Frans Billman died in 1930, the family had received some money on Frans' life insurance. During the second term at The Industrial Arts School, Torsten Billman had no money left for the studies. One morning in April 1932, on the train from Kullavik to art school, Billman wrote to his sister about expensive water colours he cannot afford to buy.

Billman tried to get work on a ship again. In the summer of 1932, he signed on his last ship, SS Marie. He had bought some sketchbooks so that he could draw during the trip. With these drawings he was accepted as a student at Valand School of Fine Arts in Gothenburg in 1933. The teacher Sigfrid Ullman (1886–1960) discovered Torsten Billman early. Under Sigfrid Ullman's direction he was able to work according to his own intuition, and here he came on an even keel again. Torsten Billman left Valand 1934, after only three terms.

=== Woodcuts made after the trip to Antwerp 1936 ===
In the spring of 1936, the Swedish composer Gösta Nystroem, that was curator at Göteborgs Konsthall 1934–1936, organizes a scholarship to Billman. Billman was given the opportunity to study art in March and April in Antwerp. The journey gave inspiration for new motifs. But above all had the harbour environments strongly reminded him of his years as a sailor. Within a year after the trip he made some of his classic black and white woodcuts with sailor motifs such as: Through the Red Sea – Changing of the guard in the stokehole (1936) and The newly signed on sailors (1936), which is one of Billman's best-known woodcuts. About the woodcut Stoker watch goes over deck in the storm (1936/37) the artist said: "I remember the first scene I got inspiration from. It was when the watch came up and the boat was filled with water and there they stood up to their necks in water, so to speak. That I thought, I would try to portray. But it took many years. I had stored such motifs." "I've experienced all my images myself", Torsten Billman often underlined.

=== At the crossroads ===
Torsten Billman's girlfriend since 1933 (Valand School of Fine Art), Kristina Hedenström (b. 1910), traveled to Paris in March 1938 to study art. Billman visited Paris in May and September 1938, and he met Swedes who had participated in the Spanish Civil War. The impressions from the journeys through Nazi Germany by train was a confirmation that a new major European war was imminent. During the visit in September he realized that their relationship was over – Kristina's intention was to stay in Paris.

In March 1939 Billman traveled to London. He made drawings for newspapers in Gothenburg and also visited Tate Gallery and The British Museum. In London he entered a planned marriage of convenience with a Jewish woman from Germany who intended to flee via Sweden.

In mid-August 1939 Billman biked to Paris (from Gothenburg) to try to persuade Kristina to return to Sweden, when a major war in Europe seemed to be coming closer by the day. After a week in Paris World War II breaks out. The 10 September 700 Swedes were transported by train from Paris to Dieppe. From Dieppe they were evacuated by two Swedish hired boats – over mined waters – to Gothenburg. Kristina Hedenström never returned to Sweden. She died in Paris in November 1943 at 33 years old.

=== Anti-Nazi images ===
After the Valand period Billman worked sporadically as a drawer for Göteborgs Handels- och Sjöfartstidning 1934–1940. The newspaper was led by the legendary editor-in-chief Torgny Segerstedt (1876–1945), which made the newspaper internationally known for his uncompromising anti-Nazi stance. Billman would later cooperate with Torgny Segerstedt's daughter the journalist and politician Ingrid Segerstedt Wiberg, which resulted in a buon fresco and a book etc.

From 1936 until 1945 Billman made images (inkdrawings and woodcuts) against fascism and Nazism. Not many newspapers dared to publish them. See: Satirarkivet, note 1.

=== Grisaille woodcuts 1940–1945 ===
In a letter of November 1937, to art historian Gunnar Jungmarker (1902–1983) at the Nationalmuseum in Stockholm, Billman reveals that he is in an artistic crisis. The black and white woodcut restricts his expression – too brutal contrasts between black and white surfaces. It was not until 1940 he was able to present a woodcut with several grey tones, developed from the ordinary black printing ink. Jungmarker called this type of woodcut: grisaille woodcut. "Gris" from French for "grey". A time-consuming printing process, exclusively for handprinting, with several grey-wood blocks (1-4) aside from the black and white key block. These first free grisaille woodcuts (made before the work with Dostoevsky's novel Crime and Punishment, in 1945) are based on self-perceived events for example from Billman's sailor years 1926–32, European travels 1936-39 and trips around Sweden during the war years. Some shining grisaille woodcuts are French Restaurant (1940), Artist Family (1941), Wilderness Kitchen (1942), Around a Guitar Player (1942), Stairway in the South (1942), Stormy Day, Dieppe sept. 1939 (1944) or Tropical Harbour (1945).

=== Book illustrator ===
Torsten Billman made a name for himself with the ink drawings he made in 1941–1943 to illustrate Harry Martinson's poetry collection Nomad (1931). Harry Martinson, winner of the Nobel Prize in Literature in 1974, like Billman had been through the mill and worked as a seaman. The illustrated edition, with some new poems, was published in 1943 by Albert Bonniers förlag in Stockholm.

Most impressive are his penetrating studies of the characters in Fyodor Dostoevsky's novel Crime and Punishment. Billman's illustrations was published by Bonniers in 1948 and 1980. This consist of some 40 grisaille woodcuts. Art critic Tord Baeckström in Göteborgs Handels- och Sjöfartstidning wrote about the grisaille woodcuts: "Billman concentrates the expression of a picture with remarkable assurance – with a few jabs of his iron he can summerize a face which speaks the poet's own language, an interior that breathes a hopeless misery, or a suggestion of a wintry street scene so that one feels the pull of Dostoevsky's prose." The publisher, collector and art connoisseur Gerard Bonnier (1917–1987) said about Billman's Dostoevsky-images: "I find them to be some of the best book illustrations made in Sweden during the 1900s."

In 1970 Billman illustrated Georg Büchner's tragedy Woyzeck with 24 woodcuts – another high point among his literary illustrations. Woyzeck the little man who is completely at the mercy of his capricious and cruel masters. "Billman squarely places social responsibility on himself as an artist: He clearly sides with the underdog."

=== Buon fresco painter ===
Between 1943 and 1949 Billman made his largest buon frescoes, in scope and artistic quality. When Billman 1943 was asked, by the ombudsman Knut Ring at Swedish Seafarers' Union and the art historian Carl Nordenfalk at Gothenburg Museum of Art, if he wanted to carry out a buon fresco on two walls of 20 metres in the New Seamen Homes ceremonial room, Billman had just worked with woodcuts and small ink illustrations. But 1943 Billman start to work on his first buon fresco painting To Sailors – Workers at Sea (1944) in Seamen's Home in Gothenburg. Billman depicts coal trimmer and stoker down in coal bunkers and stokeholes with self-perceived realism, which has not been previously seen in buon frescoes. There are also events from World War II, for example when Nazi aircraft attacking a merchant ship etc.

Billman's fresco sketches for Development of Society was awarded first prize in Nationalmuseums major competition for public art in conjunction with the exhibition Good Art in Homes and Assembly Halls in Stockholm 1945. In 1947 the buon fresco was completed in The People's House in Gävle. The buon fresco portrays key processes in Swedish history, from the 1870s (Modern Breakthrough) to the end of World War II. Billman have placed the socialist agitator August Palm (1849–1922) in the center of the fresco as a criticism to the labour movement's establishment about their forgotten history and heritage. The two other main figures in the Gävle-fresco is the author August Strindberg, next to a scene from his novel The Red Room (Strindberg) and the publicist Torgny Segerstedt.

The buon fresco In Front of Smålands Taberg (1949) in The People's House in Norrahammar (outside Jönköping/Sweden) is Torsten Billman's work to the honour of labour. With realism, poetry and local colour Billman portrays a recognizable everyday work among the foundry workers in Norrahammar. In the 1950s Billman studied buon fresco painting during his travels in Italy.

=== Grisaille woodcuts after 1963 ===
In 1963 Billman returns with his political satires Time Images. Billman had not made any "political" pictures since World War II. Billman use his developed grisaille-technique in prints such as: The Murder of Lee Oswald (1964), The Warren Commission (1964), Indian Appeals to Lincoln (1965), Mozart's funeral (1965), Party (1967) and Tear Gas in Paris (1968).

In The Murder of Lee Oswald and The Warren Commission Torsten Billman incisively commented events in the wake of the assassination of president John F. Kennedy. The Murder of Lee Oswald uncovers, in the condensed black satire, complex links people only could sense but, then, could not put into words. Two pictures – made when it happened – who went against the grain of mainstream media and which today has a prophetic force. Bertrand Russell wrote appreciatively to Torsten Billman about these two grisaille woodcuts.

He died on 6 April 1989 in Kungsbacka, Sweden.

== Major literary illustrations ==
Ink drawings:

- Harry Martinson, Nomad (poetry collection). Albert Bonniers förlag, Stockholm 1943.
- Nils Ferlin, Goggles (poetry collection). Albert Bonniers förlag, Stockholm 1945.
- B. Traven, The Death Ship. Bokförlaget Atlantis, Stockholm 1978. ISBN 91-7486-002-X.
- August Strindberg, Tales. Bokförlaget Atlantis, Stockholm 1979. ISBN 91-7486-081-X.
- Franz Kafka, The Castle (novel). Carlsson Bokförlag, Stockholm 1990. ISBN 91-7798-330-0.

Grisaille woodcut:

- Fyodor Dostoevsky, Crime and Punishment. Albert Bonniers förlag, Stockholm 1948 and 1980 (new edition) ISBN 91-0-044968-7.
- Honoré de Balzac, Cousin Pons. Sällskapet Bokvännerna no. 54, Stockholm 1961.

Woodcut:

- Georg Büchner, Woyzeck. Sällskapet Bokvännerna no. 88, Stockholm 1970.
- Jean Bruller (Vercors), The Silence of the Sea. Sällskapet Bokvännerna no. 96, Stockholm 1975. ISBN 91-7022-070-0.

== Sources ==
- Gunnar Jungmarker, Torsten Billman. Folket i Builds Konstklubb, Svenska Mästargrafiker IV, Stockholm 1956.
- Dan Lennervald, Torsten Billman, bildmakaren (Torsten Billman, The Image Maker). Published by Halland Art Museum and The Workers' Educational Association in Sweden. Kungsbacka, Sweden 2010. ISBN 978-91-633-7644-3.
- Küllike Montgomery, Torsten Billman. Bildförlaget Öppna Ögon, Stockholm 1986. ISBN 9185906433.
- Leif Sjöberg, Torsten Billman and the Wood Engraver's Art. The American Scandinavian Review pp. 163–171, Vol. LXI, No. 2, June 1973, New York, N.Y. The American-Scandinavian Foundation.
