= 2025 Gothenburg tram derailment =

Transport incident in Gothenburg, Sweden

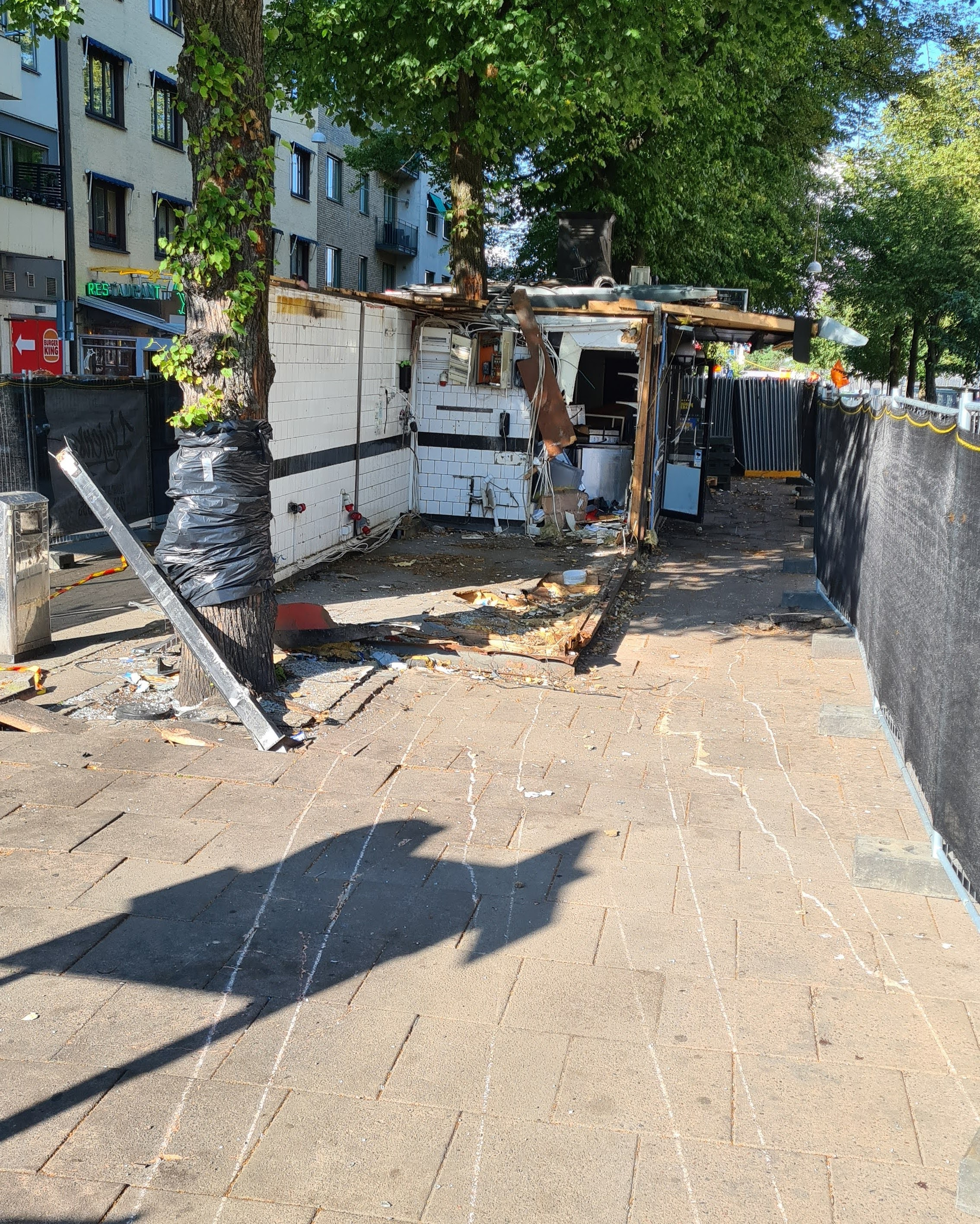
- The Sannegårdens Kebab snack bar three weeks after the accident. The outdoor seating area was located in front of the building, on the area where the white scrape marks left by the tram are now visible. The indoor seating area was located beyond the kitchen.

Details
- Date: 20 June 2025; 00:47:48 CEST (UTC+02:00)
- Location: Kungsportsavenyen, Gothenburg
- Country: Sweden
- Line: 3
- Operator: Gothenburg Tramway
- Owner: Gothenburg Municipality
- Incident type: Derailment and collision with building
- Cause: Excessive speed through points due to unconscious driver

Statistics
- Trains: 1 M31 tram
- Passengers: 10
- Crew: 1
- Deaths: None
- Injured: 8 in total; 4 in tram; 3 passengers; 1 driver; 4 in snackbar; 3 guests; 1 employee

The 2025 Gothenburg tram derailment occurred in the early hours of Midsummer Eve, on 20 June 2025 at 00:47, when a tram derailed at high speed and crashed into a snack bar at Kungsportsavenyen, Gothenburg, Sweden. Eight people were injured, three of them seriously. The excessive speed was caused by the driver suddenly falling ill and losing consciousness.

== Sequence of events ==
=== Earlier ===
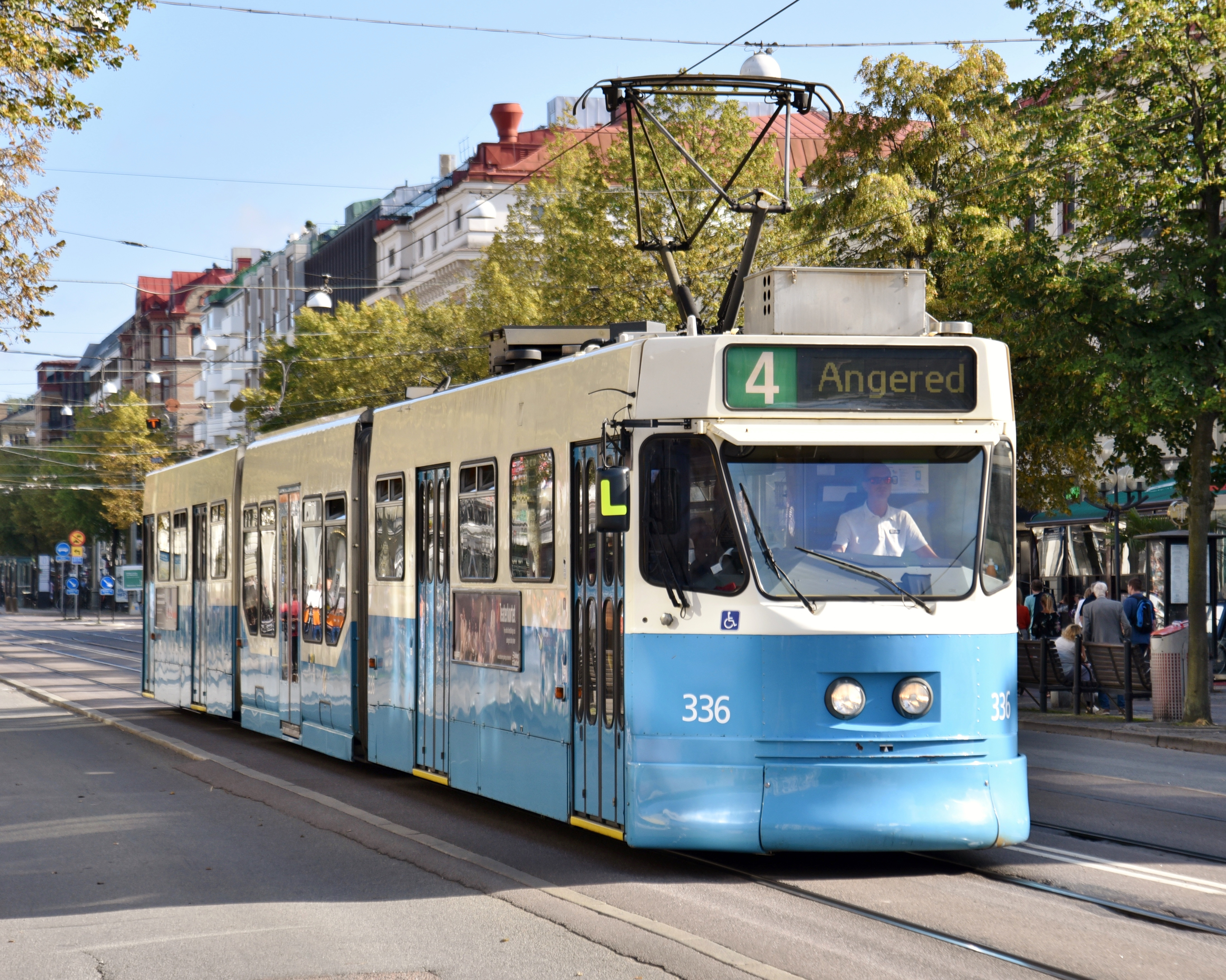
An M31 tram, same class as tram 379 that derailed.

It is about forty-five minutes past midnight on a clear, starry night before Midsummer Eve, with the temperature at 12 °C. Tram 379, class M31, operating on Line 3, is travelling its final service of the day towards Drottningtorget (Note: The stop is since 2026 known as "Drottningtorget", but at the time it was named "Centralstationen".) before returning to Rantorget Depot.

The driver, a 59-year-old man, was a qualified tram driver with seven years of experience, having previously, among other, worked as a bus driver since the mid-1990s. He worked a rotating schedule consisting mainly of afternoon and evening shifts. On the day of the accident he had started work around 16 o'clock, he felt completely well, ate and drank as usual, and did not feel tired. He had just come off an extended break, and there was also nothing else in his daily routine that reportedly differed from normal. Toxicological tests carried out at the hospital later that morning were negative for both alcohol and drugs.

=== Vasaplatsen ===
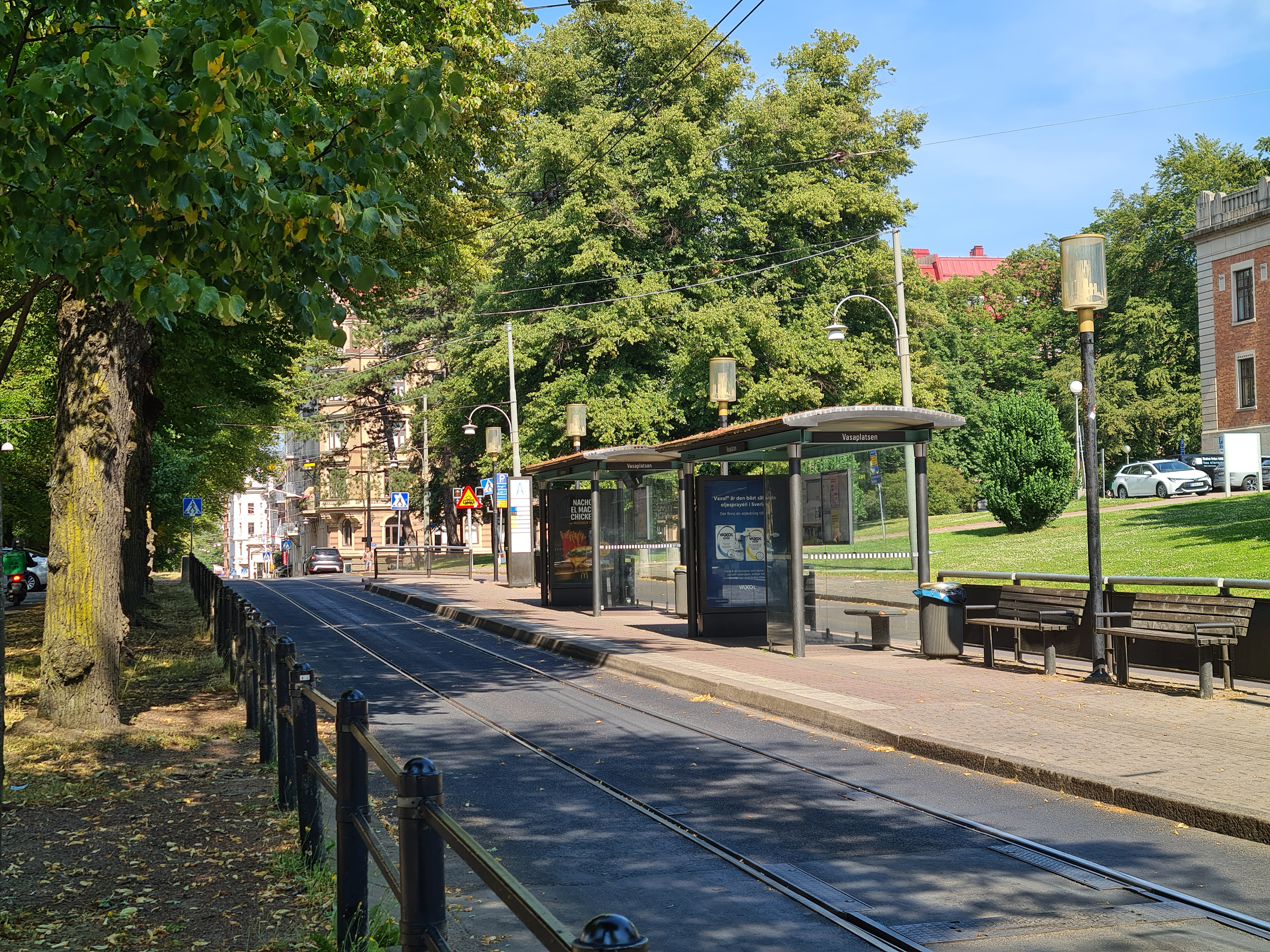
Stop Vasaplatsen which tram 379 overshot by 7 metres (23 ft).

In connection with the arrival at Vasaplatsen at 00:46, the driver's health deteriorated, as there were several irregularities in connection with the stop.

During the arrival, the tram overshot the stopping marker (Note: A stopping marker is a yellow guide mark on the platform that indicates where buses and trams are to stop with their first door.) by 7 metres (23 ft), came to a stop with a jerk, and the doors opened immediately. The tachograph recorded an abnormal and somewhat prolonged braking during which no signal to the service brake appeared to originate from the driving control. Instead, it appears that the door-open button was used to brake the tram.

At the stop an average passenger exchange took place, four passengers alighted and one boarded over a period of 14 seconds, but the doors remained open for a total of 33 seconds. By comparison, the previous longest passenger exchange had been at the larger stop Järntorget with 22 seconds.

=== Vasagatan ===
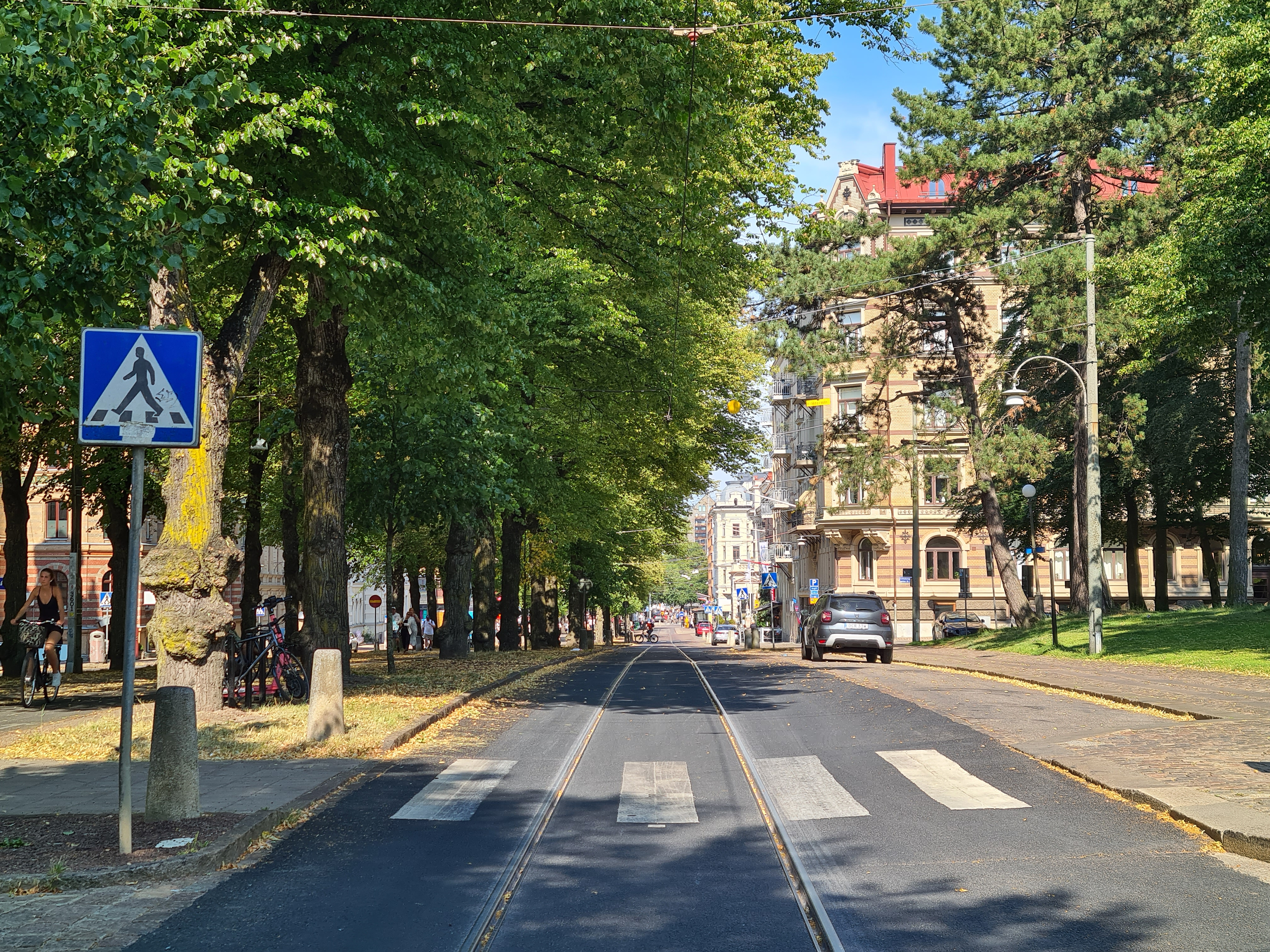
Vasagatan where tram 379 reached 64 kilometres per hour (40 mph) as technical systems prevent further acceleration.

The driver was most likely unaware of his condition, or of how quickly it would deteriorate, as the tram departed Vasaplatsen under full power. At some point in connection with this, he lost consciousness, although the exact time is unknown. As both his hand and foot remained on their respective vigilance controls, which require only minimal pressure and constitute the only installed system for monitoring the driver's level of consciousness, the tram continued forward.

This section of Vasagatan has a slight downhill gradient, which further increased the acceleration, and the tram quickly reached 64 km/h (40 mph). The speed thereafter remained largely constant until the derailment, as built-in technical systems attempted to prevent the tram from exceeding its maximum permitted speed of 60 km/h (37 mph).

Further down Vasagatan, a taxi turned onto Teatergatan and avoided the tram with literally a second to spare. Three seconds later, the tram passed the Valand stop and reached the three-way junction at Kungsportsavenyen.

=== Kungsportsavenyen ===
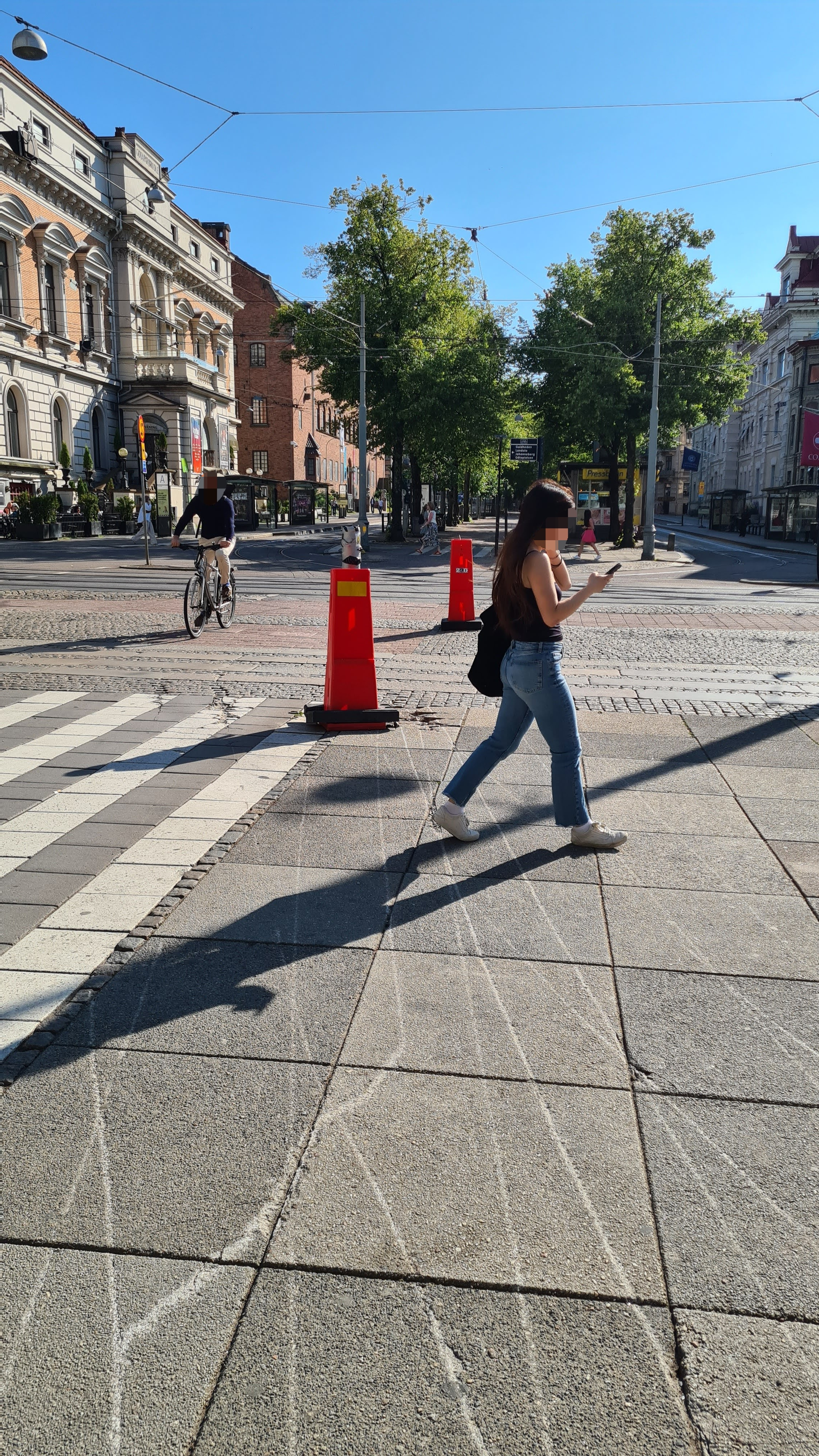
Scratch marks from tram 379 from Vasagatan, across Kungsportsavenyen, towards the snack bar.

At Kungsportsavenyen, along the pedestrian walkway in the centre of Vasagatan, is the snackbar Sannegårdens Kebab. One employee is working in the kitchen while the colleagues are taking out the rubbish. Inside the dining area, three customers are seated and a further two are standing at the outside ordering window. The outdoor seating area is empty.

The points from Vasagatan onto Kungsportsavenyen were set to the left, towards Kungsportsplatsen. The front section of the tram attempts to follow the curve, but the wheel flanges climb over the rails and the tram derails. The strong lateral force throws both the passengers and the unconscious driver to the right. As a result, the driver's body also moves the driving control into the emergency brake position, simultaneously activating the warning bell.

A passer-by crossing the path of the derailed tram manages to run aside at the last second before it continues towards the snackbar. The two customers at the ordering window also manage to get out of the way at the last second, but the employee in the kitchen and the three customers in the dining area remain inside the building.

At 00:47:48, the tram first strikes the outdoor seating area and then continues into the snackbar itself. As the tram forces its way into the kitchen area, timber studs, insulation and other building materials are pushed into both the driver's cab and the passenger compartment.

The tram's path along Vasagatan until the derailment and collision with the snack bar.

== Evacuation ==
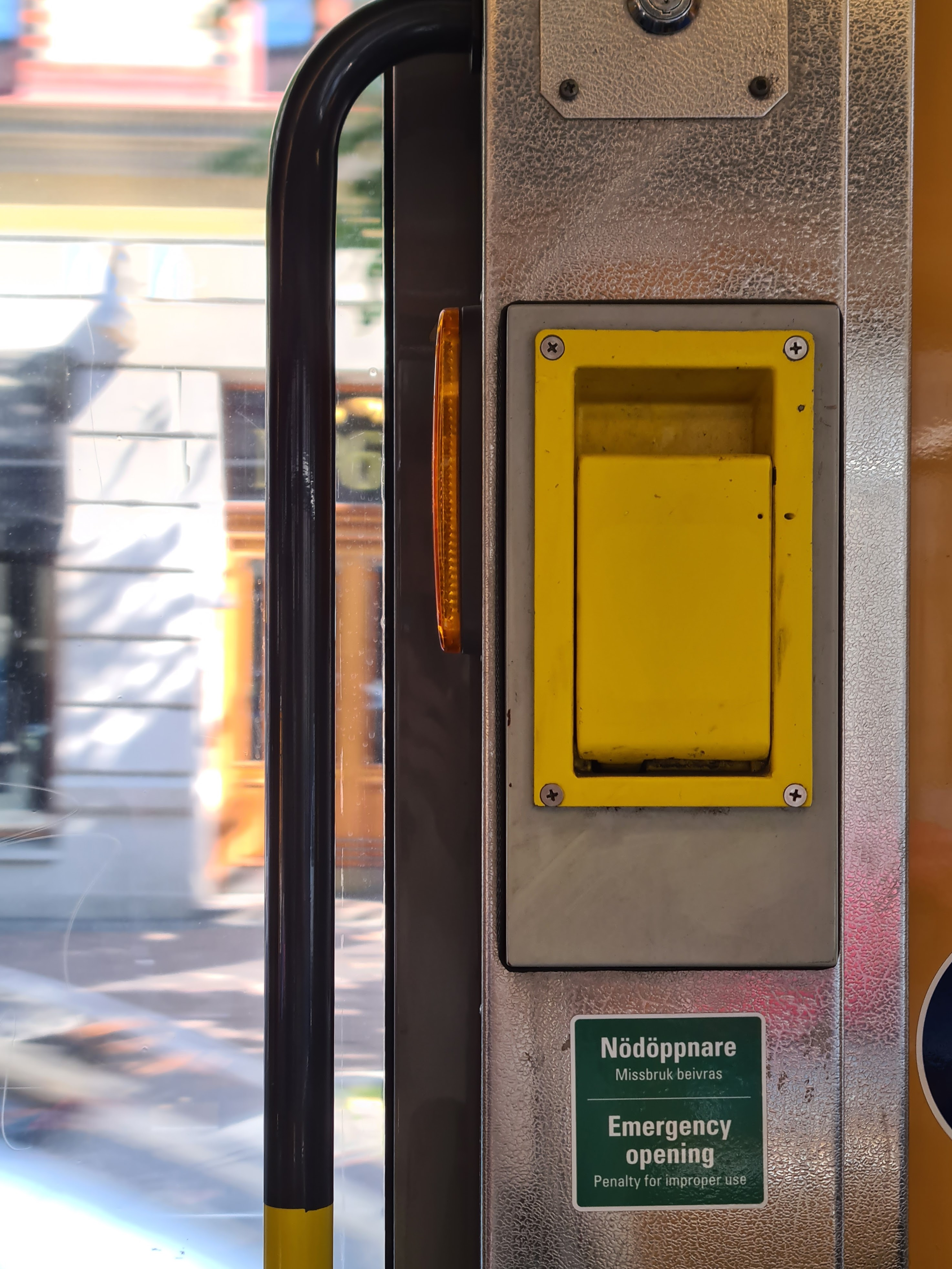
An emergency door release handle on an M31 tram, the same type fitted to tram 379. The handle sprang back after being pulled down too quickly, which closed the doors and prevented further evacuation for almost a minute. Gothenburg Tramways have said that they will rectify this abnormal behaviour in an upcoming overhaul.

As Kungsportsavenyen is a central hub for much of Gothenburg's nightlife, there were several witnesses to the accident. At 00:48:12, twenty-four seconds after the crash, the first emergency call was received by SOS Alarm, and nearby members of the public quickly arrived to assist with the evacuation.

The third pair of doors, in the middle section of the tram, was emergency-opened immediately after the accident, but after only two passengers had managed to evacuate, the doors closed and could not be opened again. While people outside attempted to reopen the third pair of doors, the passengers in the front section of the tram evacuated through the second pair of doors. After approximately 40 seconds, they succeeded in reopening the third pair of doors, and all passengers had evacuated by 00:48:52, approximately one minute after the crash. A later technical investigation by the Accident Investigation Authority showed that the emergency door release handle returns to its original position if it is operated too quickly and without sufficient care.

Inside the snackbar, where the kitchen had largely been demolished, the employee was trapped beneath a refrigerator. A friend from a nearby kiosk managed to pull him out of the building.

As the driver's cab was filled with building materials and had sustained very extensive damage, no attempts were initially made to reach the driver. Once the evacuation had been completed, however, sounds were heard from inside the cab, whereupon several people opened the front doors and began clearing away debris to reach him. Just over three minutes later, they succeeded in pulling the driver out, after which he was assisted to a park bench by two people. The driver was found to have no serious external injuries, but he had a reduced level of consciousness, was confused, and was unable to answer questions. A member of the public with medical training assessed the driver as possibly being in shock.

== Emergency response ==
The first emergency services unit arrived at 00:54:52, approximately seven minutes after the crash.

As both the tram and the snackbar had already been evacuated, the focus was on treating the injured and securing the surrounding area. Despite the extensive damage to the snackbar, its load-bearing structure remained intact and there was no risk of collapse. To ensure that no one was trapped beneath the tram, a recovery vehicle was requested. The lifting operation began at 02:22, and no person was found underneath the tram.

=== Injuries ===
The two passengers seated in the second row at the front of the tram sustained serious injuries. A third passenger, seated in the fourth row, sustained minor injuries and sought medical attention independently. The remaining passengers escaped without major injuries. The employee who was in the kitchen sustained serious injuries to his leg and hip, and the three guests in the dining area sustained minor injuries. Four people were transported to hospital by ambulance, and a fifth by the police.

=== The driver ===
==== At the accident site ====
The driver has no memory of the period after Vasaplatsen until he was sitting on a park bench receiving pain stimulus from the ambulance personnel. The only physical injury noted by the ambulance personnel was a laceration to the lip. They also noted that the driver had vomited, was somnolent, pale and fatigued, and was yawning frequently in a manner they perceived as abnormal. The ambulance personnel's initial assessment was that the driver may have suffered a stroke or an epileptic seizure before the accident.

As the ambulance personnel were needed elsewhere at the accident scene, the driver was handed over to a newly arrived ambulance crew consisting of a nurse and a nursing assistant. During the handover between the two ambulance crews, some information was lost. Among other things, the newly arrived crew gained the impression that the driver had been unaffected and had exited the driver's cab without assistance. As the driver was considered a possible suspect at the time, a police officer also accompanied him in the ambulance.

==== At the hospital ====
Upon arrival at the hospital, the ambulance personnel reported that the ECG and vital signs showed no abnormalities and that the driver showed no external signs of serious injury. The attending physician was undergoing specialist training in surgery and managed the case independently. He ordered CT scans of the brain and chest, as well as laboratory tests.

The CT scans showed no internal injuries, and the laboratory tests revealed no signs of either alcohol or drugs. Together with the physical examination, this led the physician to conclude that no further treatment or observation in hospital was required. The final diagnoses were "laceration of the lip" and "chest contusion". The driver's lip was then sutured, and he was referred to his local community health centre to have the stitches removed one week later. No investigation of the disturbance of consciousness was undertaken in the emergency department, and the driver was instead advised to contact a doctor if necessary.

At the time, all trauma beds at the hospital were occupied. No consideration was given to admitting the driver to another type of ward. A consultant on-call (Note: A senior physician on-call, usually off-site, who provides advice and can come to the hospital if required.) and an intermediate on-call (Note: A senior on-call physician based at the hospital, available to assist more junior doctors if necessary.) physician, in the form of a more experienced colleague, were also available, but the latter was occupied with stabilising a more seriously injured patient from the same accident.

Shortly after 03 o'clock, following his stay at the hospital, the accompanying police officer transported the driver to the police station for questioning. There, he was held in a police cell for a short time before being questioned from 05:41 to 06:05. The driver was then allowed to return home.

== Aftermath ==
=== Accident Investigation Authority ===
During the same night, the Swedish Accident Investigation Authority (SHK) consulted with Gothenburg Tramways and the police regarding the accident and authorised clearance of the accident scene. The tram could then be recovered to the Rantorget tram depot for technical examination, and the accident site on Kungsportsavenyen could be partially restored. SHK began its technical examination of the tram on 21 June and of the accident site on 22 June.

Following its investigation, the SHK concluded that there were no faults in either the track infrastructure or the tram that could have contributed to the accident. As Gothenburg's tram system operates on the principle of driving on sight, the driver constitutes the primary safety barrier in the event of a hazard.

The investigation further shows that the vigilance control was not designed to deal with situations in which the driver suddenly suffers a disturbance of consciousness. Nor were there any other technical systems, either in the vehicle or the track infrastructure, to monitor the driver's condition or the safe operation of the tram. In the absence of clear regulations and guidance, it is in practice left to each manufacturer, owner and operator to determine what constitutes an adequate level of safety.

In several previous accident investigations (Brunnsparken 2025, Sälöfjordsgatan 2025, Angeredsbanan 2024, Komettorget 2017 and Beväringegatan 2011), Gothenburg Tramways and the Urban Environment Administration (Note: In Swedish: Stadsmiljöförvaltningen. This administration has overall responsibility for Gothenburg's public spaces and overall accessibility.) were unable to determine the cause of the accidents, including whether the driver had suffered a disturbance of consciousness. The SHK has therefore repeatedly emphasised the need for driver-facing cameras so that the recordings can be used to support safety investigations. Gothenburg Tramways has previously considered the introduction of driver-facing cameras on several occasions but has each time decided not to proceed.

=== The driver ===
As the healthcare services focused primarily on the driver's immediate injuries, his medical condition was never investigated in greater detail. This limits the ability to determine what caused the driver's disturbance of consciousness. During his visits to the emergency department and the community health centre, no medical assessment was made regarding his fitness to retain his driving licence or to operate vehicles.

The first time the disturbance of consciousness was addressed by a physician was in late September 2025, during an occupational health examination. As a result of that examination, the driver was deemed unfit to operate trams.

Initially, the police opened a criminal investigation into gross negligence and causing grievous bodily harm (transl. grov vårdslöshet samt grovt vållande till kroppsskada). However, as the underlying cause was determined to be illness and there was no evidence of criminal intent, the police discontinued the investigation against the driver.

=== The snackbar ===
Some time after the accident, the snackbar was demolished. According to the owner, in June 2025, there were plans to rebuild the snackbar. But 12 months later the site was still empty.

=== The emergency door release ===
During the evacuation of the tram, a situation arose in which a pair of emergency-opened doors closed automatically despite passengers still remaining inside the tram. An SHK investigation showed that the emergency door release can spring back and cause the doors to close if it is not pulled down carefully. Gothenburg Tramways will rectify the abnormal behaviour of the emergency door release as part of the upcoming overhaul of its tram fleet.

== See also ==
- 1992 Gothenburg tram derailment
