= Torgny =

Torgny is a given name. Notable people with the name include:

- Torgny Anderberg (1919–2000), Swedish actor and film director
- Torgny Lindgren (1938–2017), Swedish writer
- Torgny Mogren (born 1963), former Swedish cross country skier
- Torgny Säve-Söderbergh (born 1914), Swedish writer, translator, and professor of Egyptology at Uppsala University
- Torgny Segerstedt (1876–1945), Swedish professor and scholar of comparative religion
- Torgny T:son Segerstedt (1908–1999), Swedish philosopher and sociologist
- Torgny Söderberg, Swedish songwriter
- Torgny Segerstedt (1876–1945), Swedish scholar of comparative religion, editor-in-chief of Göteborgs Handels- och Sjöfartstidning (1917–1945)
- Torgny Torgnysson Segerstedt (1908–1999), Swedish philosopher and sociologist
- Torgny Wåhlander, Swedish long jumper
- Torgny Wickman (1911–1997), Swedish screenwriter and film director

== See also ==
- Torgny (village), a village in the Belgian municipality of Rouvroy, Wallonia
- Torgny Melins, dansband from Säffle, Sweden
- Torgny the Lawspeaker, the name of one of at least three generations of lawspeakers by the name Þorgnýr
- Torgny Peak, bare rock peak 2 nautical miles (3.7 km) west of Fenriskjeften Mountain in the Drygalski Mountains of Queen Maud Land

Media related to Torgny (given name) at Wikimedia Commons
