= 1992 Gothenburg tram derailment =

1992 transport incident in Gothenburg, Sweden

Coordinates: 57.699170°N 11.969427°E

Vasaplatsen tram accident
- Aftermath of the accident.

Details
- Date: 12 March 1992 c. 9:10 a.m. CET (UTC+01:00)
- Location: Vasaplatsen, Gothenburg, Sweden
- Country: Sweden
- Line: 7
- Operator: Göteborgs Spårvägar
- Cause: Brakes disconnected by unqualified personnel following a power outage, unknowingly disabling the emergency brakes.

Statistics
- Trains: 1 tram (4 carriages)
- Vehicles: 4 automobiles
- Deaths: 13
- Injured: 42

The route of the runaway tram, from stop Wavrinskys plats in the south to stop Vasaplatsen in north.

On 12 March 1992, an accident occurred at Vasaplatsen in Gothenburg, Sweden when a tram with disconnected brakes rolled 1.5 kilometres (0.9 mi) downhill, travelling backwards against traffic along Guldhedsgatan and Aschebergsgatan. Reaching speeds of up to 100 km/h (62 mph), it ploughed sideways across the Vasaplatsen tram platform, crushing over 50 waiting commuters as well as two cars and their passengers on a parallel road. The accident remains the deadliest in the history of the Gothenburg Tramway, killing 13 people and injuring 42 others.

== Course of event ==
=== Lead-up to the accident ===
The accident originated when a tramway segment used by Line 7 lost power, due to a malfunctioning pantograph that burned an overhead wire near the Medicinaregatan stop. This caused a power outage along an extended section of track. The accident tram, designated tram train number 19 and consisting of the M21 duo-carriage sets 235 and 245, came to a sudden halt near the Wavrinskys plats stop when the outage triggered an automatic brake, partially blocking a roundabout. Shortly after, the driver evacuated the tram to allow passengers to find alternative ways of transport.

As the track behind it belonged to a different segment that was unaffected by the power outage – other trams had begun building a queue and were waiting. A traffic controller began sending these into service one by one by reversing them down Aschebergsgatan Street. An auxiliary switch was set westward towards Vasagatan Street, allowing trams to reverse along Vasagatan Street and then continue eastbound in service towards Valand stop and onwards to the line's terminus Kortedala.

In blue: the rerouted path of reversing trams along Vasagatan Street via an auxiliary switch. In red: the path later taken by carriage 245–235, which derailed at the switch and continued towards Platform D on the road surface.

However, the accident tram at stop Wavrinskys plats could not be reversed, as it was without power. Its brakes were automatically engaged. A traffic controller manually disengaged the brakes via the outside so that the tram could roll downhill about 20–30 metres (70–100 ft) down street Guldhedsgatan, in the direction of stop Chalmers, where the overhead line had power. The driver was asked to ride along so he, when given signal, could pull the emergency brake under the live wires.

This order was a violation of existing regulations. The brakes of a powerless tram should only be disengaged when it was connected to another tram or a recovery vehicle. The traffic controller's assumption that the brakes would automatically re-engage upon re-entering a powered section was also incorrect. This required the tram to be restarted from the driver's console. However, this was not possible because the fuse in the control panel blew when the tram entered the powered section, preventing the tram systems from starting.

=== The accident ===
==== Street Guldhedsgatan ====
A police patrol, consisting of officers Birgitta Apelqvist^{α} and Stefan Karlsson – who were on site to manage traffic around the obstructing tram – was asked to drive alongside the tram to prevent traffic from interfering with the short manoeuvre.

What had been intended as a 20–30 metres (70–100 ft) manoeuvre quickly turned into an uncontrolled rollback. The police patrol, positioned alongside the tram, recognised the danger almost immediately and drove ahead to warn others. Inside the tram, the driver frantically ran through the carriage, pulling all four emergency handles – though none of them functioned, as the brake system had been disengaged – as the tram continued to gain speed.

The tram rolled backwards down street Guldhedsgatan, past stop Chalmers, and continued on Aschebergsgatan past stop Kapellplatsen, against traffic, unable to brake.

==== Intersection Engelbrektsgatan ====
At the intersection of Aschebergsgatan and Engelbrektsgatan, the police vehicle narrowly avoided a collision with a Ford Escort – which, unaware of the danger, had pulled over into the opposite lane to give way to the police car behind him – but was instead struck by the tram. The car got demolished, but the driver survived the crash with only a sprained foot and injuries from flying glass. The police then pulled out of the tram’s path and moved to the side, both because of its high speed and because they had nowhere left to go.

==== Intersection Vasagatan ====
At the next intersection, with Vasagatan, the tram crashes into a taxi standing still, which lands on its roof. This is also where the tram hits a junction at an estimated speed of 100 km/h (62 mph), derails, and continues moving sideways through the street.

==== Tram stop Vasaplatsen ====
At the Vasaplatsen tram stop people were waiting for a tram towards Tynnered. Only a few manage to notice the runaway tram in time, since most are looking down at the ground, shielding themselves from the falling snow.

The 54-tonne tram ploughed sideways across the platform at Vasaplatsen stop. It mowed down over 50 people, crossed a parallel roadway, crushing two cars – including several parked ones – and finally crashed into a nearby building.

Two cars were crushed beneath the tram, one of which had its fuel tank punctured and caught fire. The fire spread to the tram. Police attempted in vain to extinguish it. There were three people in the cars, all of whom died.

Within 40 minutes, all the injured had been taken to hospital. In video footage, flames could be seen along the tram rails – it was burning petrol flowing downhill towards street Parkgatan. Thirteen people were killed and forty-two were injured.

=== Rescue operation ===
The first emergency call from the public reached SOS Alarm at 9:17 a.m., followed shortly by twenty additional calls. Emergency services were dispatched at 9:18 a.m., and hospital wards were notified a couple of minutes later. Initial estimates of the number of injured ranged from 100 to 200, likely due to the scale of the accident and the widespread chaos at the scene. Some of the first emergency personnel to arrive initially believed the scene was a training exercise, due to the large number of injured spread across the street and the extensive destruction. Even experienced responders described the scene as surreal and unlike previous real incidents.

No medical assembly point for the injured was established, and no advanced medical care was provided at the scene. Instead, ambulance personnel followed the rapid evacuation strategy known as “load and go”, in which only basic first aid was administered before the patient was immediately transported to hospital. This approach was considered the most appropriate, as on-site care was not time-efficient due to the high number of severe injuries and the close proximity of Sahlgrenska Hospital, Östra Hospital, and Mölndal Hospital. At 10:03 a.m., the last patient was picked up and transported to hospital. Later forensic examination of the 13 deceased showed that none could have been saved through medical intervention at the scene of the accident.

== Aftermath ==
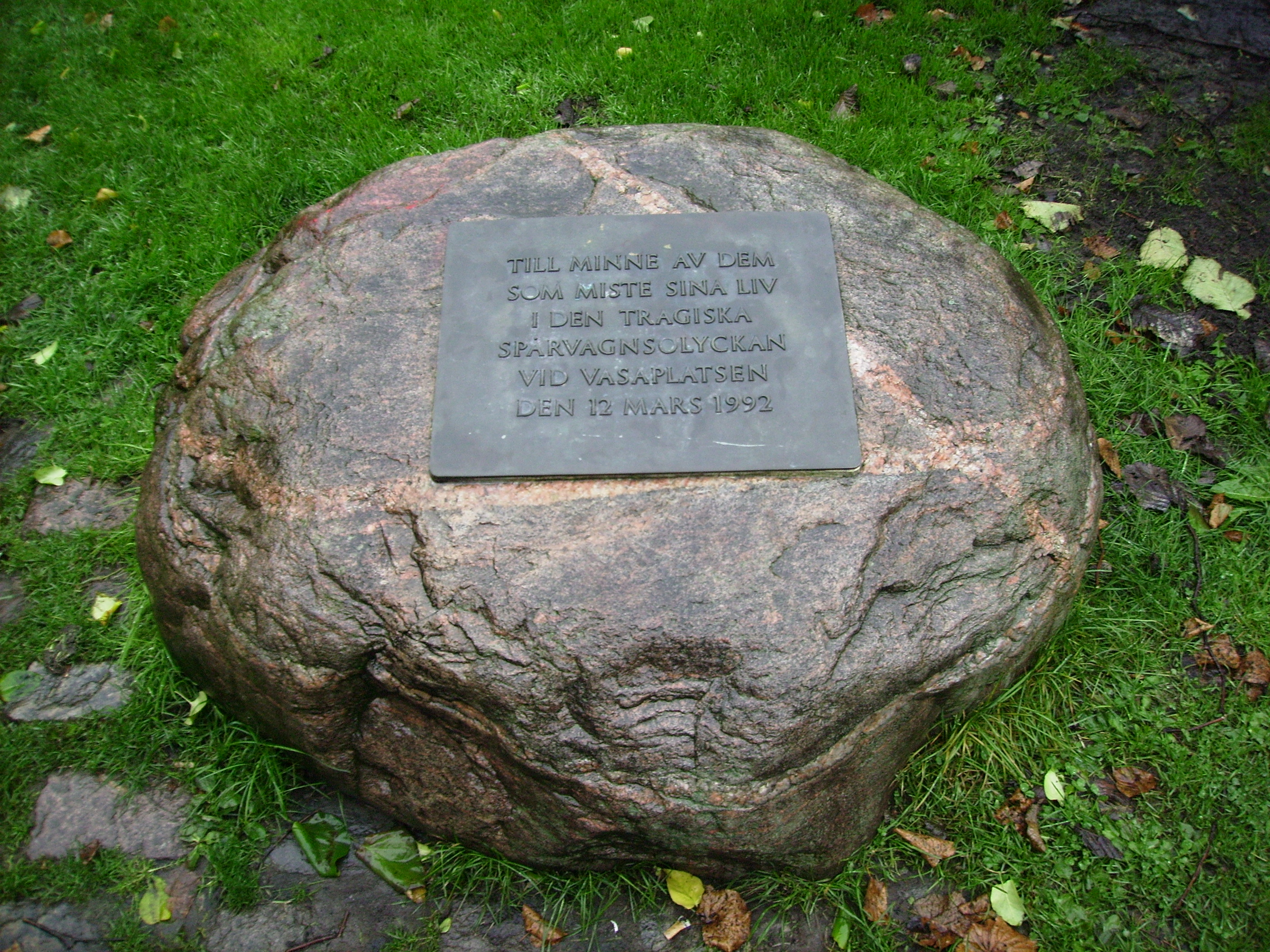
A memorial stone at Vasaplatsen, near the site of the accident.

The same evening, the function to manually disconnect the mechanical brakes from the outside was removed. Since this had been widely covered in the media, they did not dare keep it as it was, as anyone would have been able to disconnect the brakes with relative ease.

During the subsequent investigation, two opposing opinions arose about who, or what, was to blame:

- One side considered that the fault lay with the traffic controller. The policy included several safety regulations stating that only technicians were allowed to disconnect the mechanical brakes, and the traffic controller should have known this.
- The other side believed the fault lay within the system, citing insufficient policies and training, and argued that the traffic controller could not reasonably have known about the knock-on effects. Part of this argument was that neither the driver nor 13 of the 18 other controllers knew about the full consequences – among other things, that the emergency brakes would also be disconnected – when manually disconnecting the mechanical brakes, and that there were no warning systems to inform them of this.

The Swedish Accident Investigation Authority concluded that the company had not provided its staff with sufficient training on the affected M21 tram model.

Two years after the accident, the managing director and the traffic controller of Göteborgs Spårvägar were prosecuted. The charges were gross negligence manslaughter and gross public endangerment (transl. grovt vållande till annans död och grov allmänfarlig vårdslöshet). The court ultimately argued that the fault lay with the traffic controller, as the rules approved by Järnvägsinspektionen (transl. The Railway Inspectorate) were clear, and that the traffic controller "should have known better". However, since there were deficiencies in both the regulations and the training provided, and because the brakes could be disconnected with relative ease, the court concluded that the offence did not constitute a gross violation. As such, the managing director was acquitted. The traffic controller, however, was convicted of causing another person's death, causing bodily harm, and reckless endangerment (transl. vållande till annans död, vållande till kroppskada och allmänfarlig vårdslöshet), and was given a suspended sentence along with a fine of kr 5,000.

A 2010-hour-long episode of P3 Dokumentär about the accident summarises the issue of blame and responsibility as follows:

And in that way, this case is complex, because it's not easy to determine whose responsibility it really was. The accident claims the lives of 13 people and injures 42 others. The actual cause was a disconnected brake – and the traffic controller who disconnected the brake was the only one convicted, even though he didn't know that the emergency brake was also being disconnected. Göteborgs Spårvägar was then criticised for the staff's lack of knowledge. But since their rules and training had been approved by an authority, they didn’t realise what a safety risk it posed. And no better answer than that is given to the question of blame.

— Ida Lundqvist, P3 Dokumentär

Today, a memorial stone stands on the grass in the park next to the tram stop where the accident occurred.

== Miscellaneous ==
- The traffic controller went on sick leave and later received a new position at a subsidiary company.
- The driver returned to work after three weeks, initially driving together with an instructor by his side.
- Police officers Birgitta Apelqvist^{α} and Stefan Karlsson were awarded the Medal for Noble Deeds, fifth class in gold, by the Swedish government for their actions.
- The fire service's old crane truck SDO 428, a 1969 Magirus Kranwagen, was used in active duty for the last time during this incident.
- A similar accident occurred on the same street in the 1930s, when a trailer car became detached from a turning loop then located at stop Kapellplatsen. Fortunately, there were no passengers aboard the runaway trailer. A driver in a motorised tram travelling up street Aschebergsgatan noticed what was happening and managed to reverse his tram at relatively high speed to intercept the free-rolling trailer. He succeeded reasonably well, and only material damage occurred. Since then, all Albert couplings in the tram system have been equipped with a safety chain.

== Gallery ==
Path of the runaway tram (June, 2025).

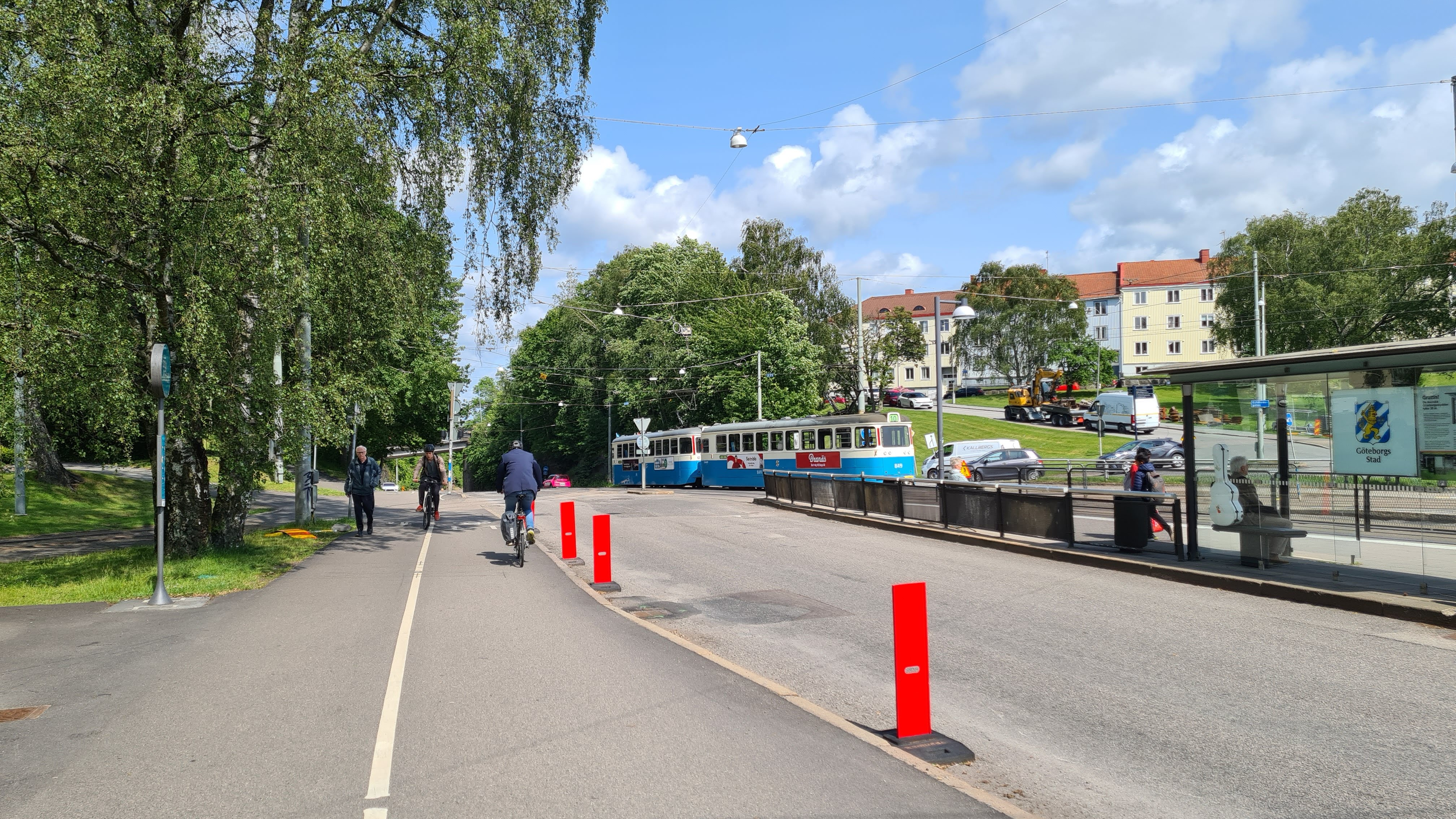
Stop Wavrinskys plats, where the runaway tram started rolling.

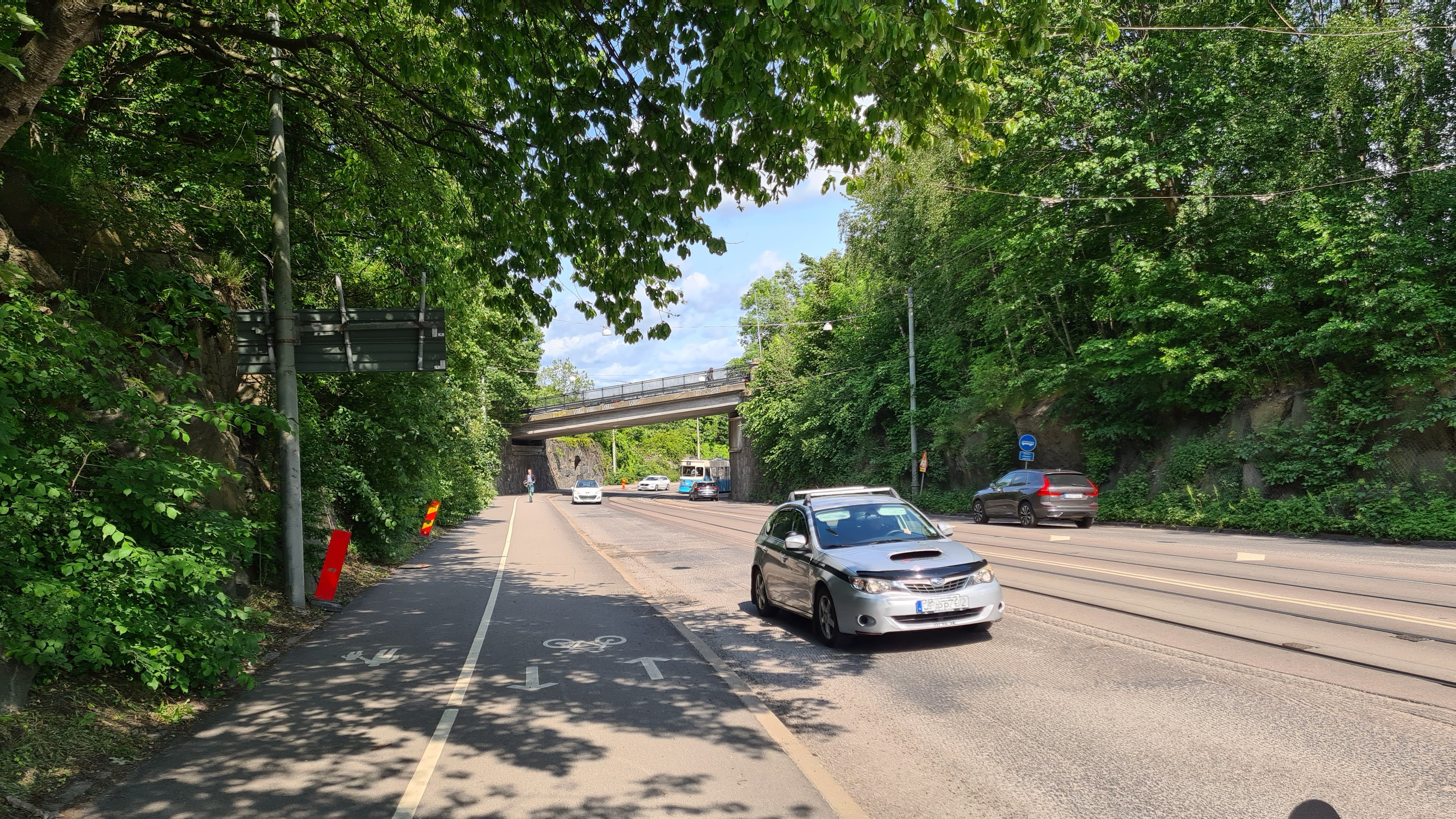
Upper part of street Guldhedsgatan after Wavrinskys plats.

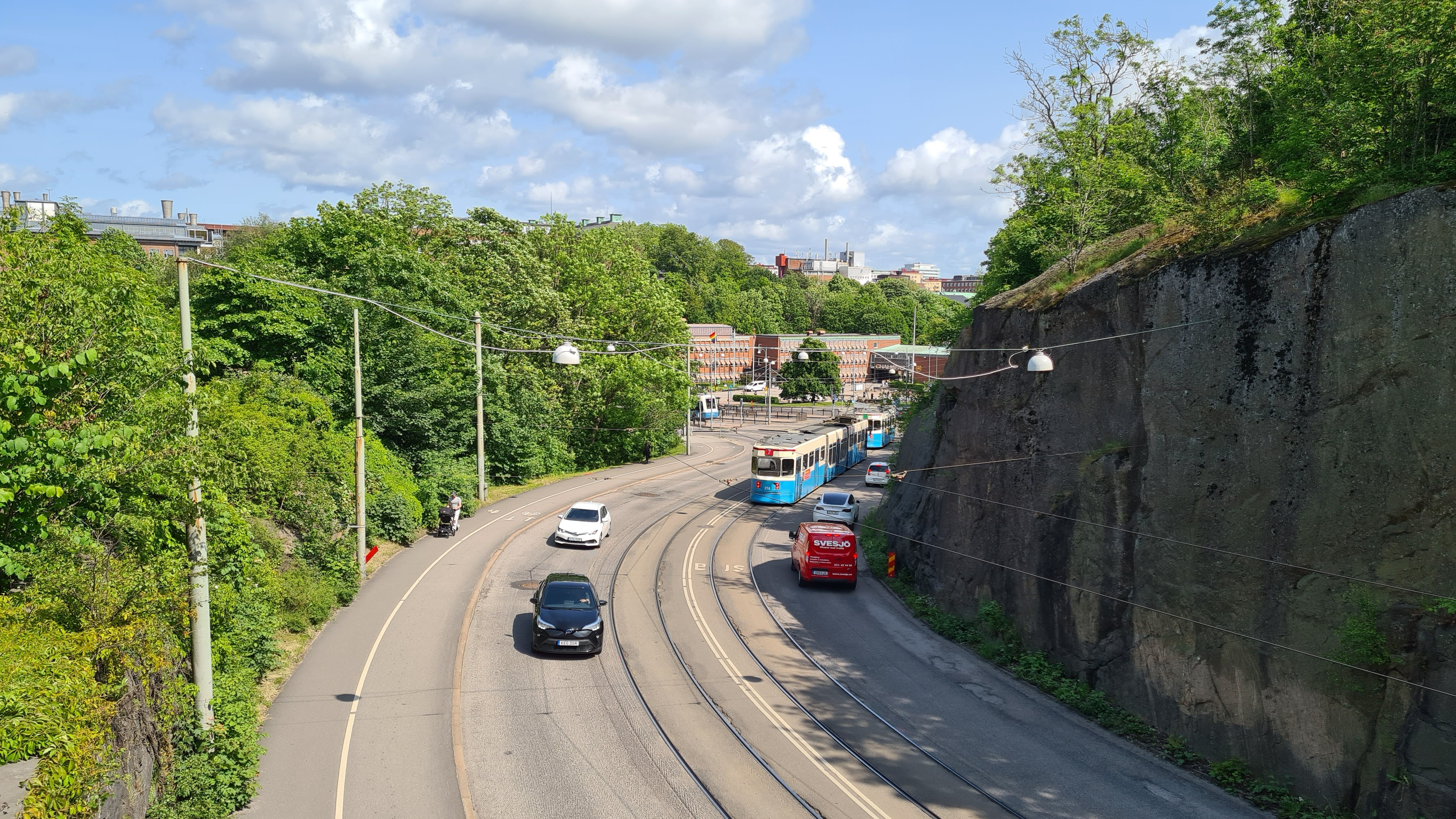
Lower part of street Guldhedsgatan towards stop Chalmers.

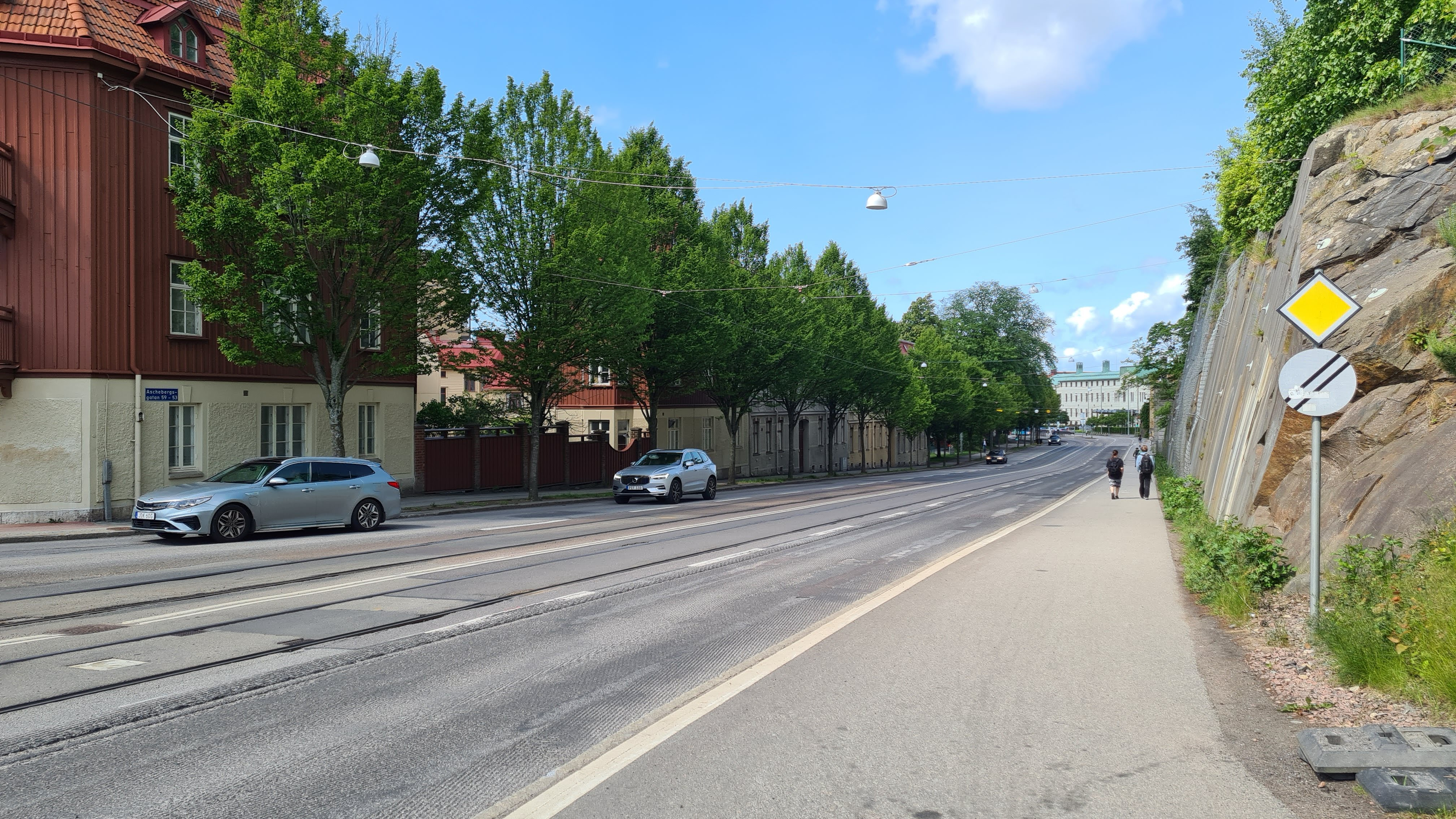
The upper part of street Aschebergsgatan, after stop Chalmers towards stop Kapellplatsen.

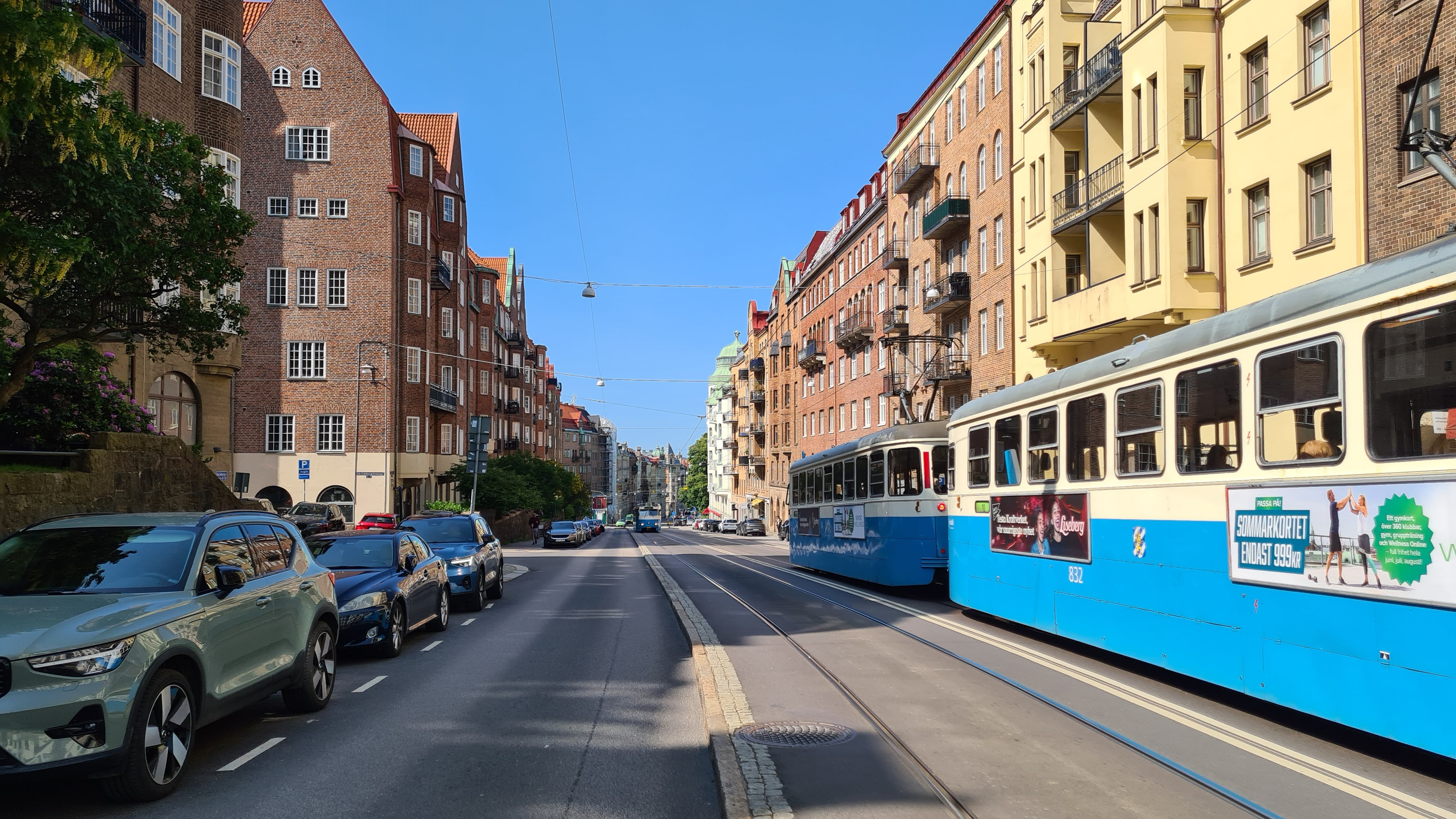
Street Aschebergsgatan after stop Kapellplatsen, towards stop Vasaplatsen.

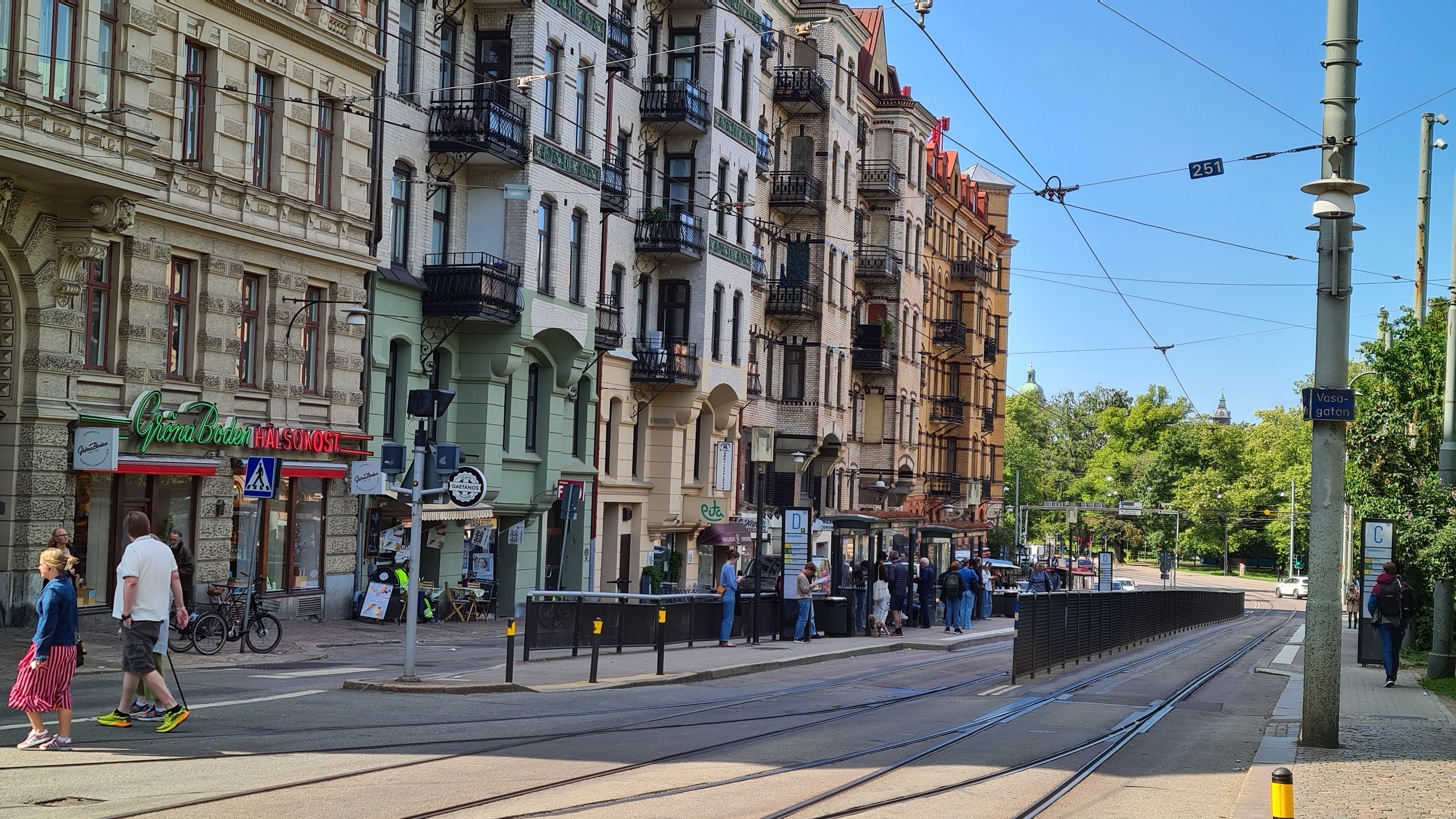
Stop Vasaplatsen, where the runaway tram crashed into platform D.

== Notes ==
^α At the time of the accident, the police officer's name is Birgitta Apelqvist. Later, for unrelated reasons, she changed her surname and is referred to as Birgitta Norrman in some sources.

== Sources ==
- Forsberg, Anders (2006). Linje 7 [Line 7] (in Swedish). Stockholm: Trafiknostalgiska Förlaget. ISBN 9185305189.
- Hansson, Jan, ed. (1999). Millennium - årtusendets bok [Millennium – the book of the millennium] (in Swedish). Gothenburg: Göteborgs-Posten. p. 288. ISBN 9789197336321.
