= Vasagatan =

Vasagatan (Swedish: "The Vasa Street") named after King Vasa is a common name for major streets in Swedish cities, the two most well-known being:

- Vasagatan, Stockholm
- Vasagatan (Gothenburg)
