= Bo Ralph =

Swedish linguist, Member of the Swedish Academy

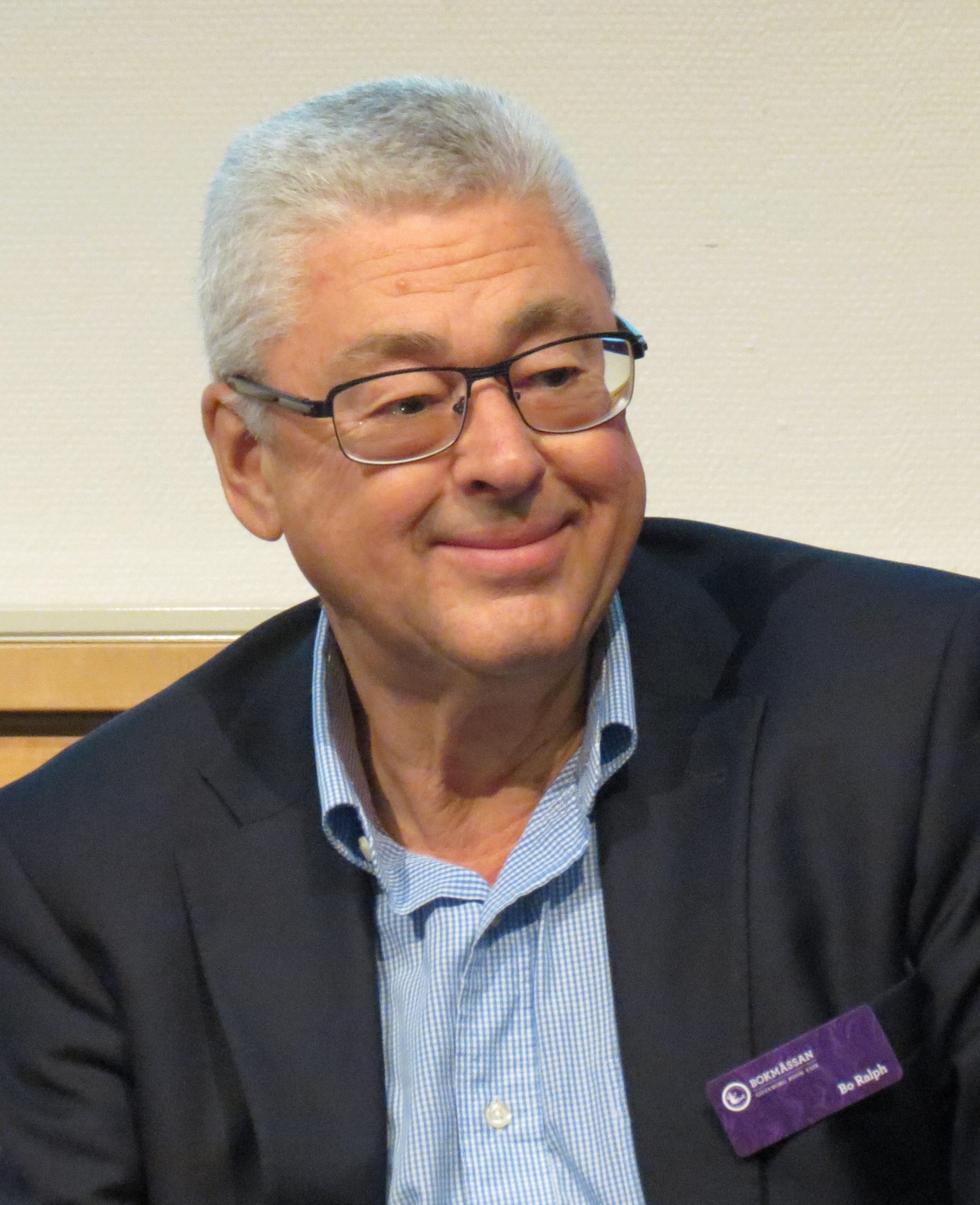
- Born: Bo Rune Ingemar Ralph; 4 October 1945 (age 80); Gothenburg, Sweden
- Occupations: linguist, university teacher, writer
- Employer(s): Stockholm University; University of Gothenburg

Member of the Swedish Academy (Seat No. 2)
- Incumbent
- Assumed office 20 December 1999
- Preceded by: Torgny T:son Segerstedt

Bo Rune Ingemar Ralph (born 4 October 1945) is a Swedish linguist, member of the Swedish Academy, and professor of Nordic Languages at the Department of Swedish Language at University of Gothenburg. He was elected to the Swedish Academy on 15 April 1999 and admitted on 20 December 1999. Bo Ralph succeeded the philosopher and sociologist Torgny T:son Segerstedt to Seat No.2.

He is a member of the Norwegian Academy of Science and Letters.

== Bibliography ==
- Introduktion i historisk språkvetenskap (1971)
- Riktlinjer för en systemlösning till Meijerbergs etymologiska register (1972)
- Contributions to case theory (1972)
- The development of final devoicing in the Germanic languages (1973)
- Constraining predictiveness in phonology (1974)
- Phonological differentiation : studies in Nordic language history (1975)
- Fornsvenska (1984)
- Svenskans grundläggande prepositioner (1984)
- Sicket mål (1986); co-author: Lars-Gunnar Andersson
- Mål på hemmaplan (1987); co-author: Lars-Gunnar Andersson
- Torgny Segerstedt : inträdestal i Svenska akademien (1999)

== Notes ==
Cultural offices
Preceded by Torgny T:son Segerstedt	Swedish Academy, Seat No.2; 1999–present	Incumbent
