= Fenristunga =

Ice field in Antarctica

Fenristunga (71°52′S 8°17′E) is a sloping field of ice within the rock walls of hairpin-shaped Fenriskjeften Mountain, in the Drygalski Mountains of Queen Maud Land, Antarctica. It was mapped from surveys and air photos by the Sixth Norwegian Antarctic Expedition (1956–60) and named Fenristunga (Fenrir's tongue) in association with Fenriskjeften Mountain.
