= Martin H:son Holmdahl =

Swedish professor of anesthesiology

Svante Martin Henriksson Holmdahl (10 June 1923 – 11 March 2015) was a Swedish professor of anesthesiology, who was rector magnificus of Uppsala university between 1978 and 1989.

Holmdahl began his medical studies in Uppsala in 1942. In 1953 he became responsible for the anesthesiology department at the Academic Hospital in Uppsala.

In 1956 his doctoral dissertation Pulmonary Uptake of Oxygen, Acid-base Metabolism, and Circulation During Prolonged Apnoea was published. He became head of the anesthesiology department at Uppsala university in 1965, and in 1970 he was appointed prorektor. When Torgny T:son Segerstedt retired as vice chancellor of the university in 1978, Holmdahl was appointed as his successor, and he held the post until his retirement in 1989.

In 2003, Uppsala University instituted The Martin H:son Holmdahl Scholarship for the promotion of human rights and liberty, in honour of Holmdahl's 80th birthday. He died at the age of 91 in Uppsala in 2015.

Academic offices
Preceded by Torgny Segerstedt	Rector of Uppsala University; 1 July 1978 – 30 June 1989	Succeeded by Stig Strömholm
