= Torgny Peak =

Mountain in Queen Maud Land, Antarctica

Torgny Peak (71°51′S 8°6′E) is a bare rock peak 2 nautical miles (3.7 km) west of Fenriskjeften Mountain in the Drygalski Mountains of Queen Maud Land, Antarctica. Photographed from the air by the German Antarctic Expedition (1938–39). Mapped from surveys and air photos by Norwegian Antarctic Expedition (1956–60) and named for Torgny Vinje, meteorologist with Norwegian Antarctic Expedition (1956–60).
