= Ingvar Andersson =

Swedish historian

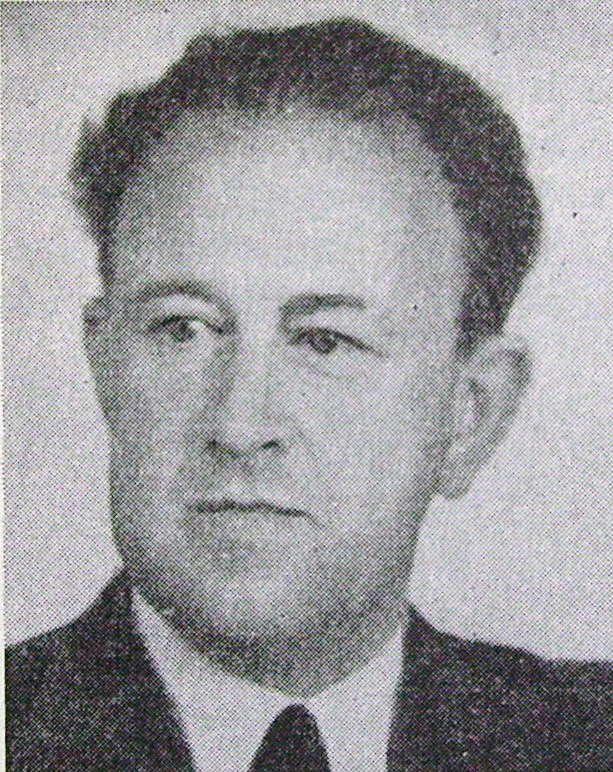
Carl Ingvar Andersson

Carl Ingvar Andersson (19 March 1899 – 14 October 1974) was a Swedish historian and director of the National Archives of Sweden.

Andersson was an associate professor at Lund University from 1928 to 1938 and director of the National Archives from 1950 to 1965. Most of his historical research was focused on the 16th century. Among his works is a biography of Eric XIV of Sweden (1935) and his life's work Skånes historia (1947–1975). In 1950 Andersson became a member of the Swedish Academy.

Cultural offices
Preceded by Martin Lamm	Swedish Academy, Seat No.2; 1950-1974	Succeeded by Torgny T:son Segerstedt
