= Torgny T:son Segerstedt =

Swedish philosopher and sociologist

Torgny T. Segerstedt
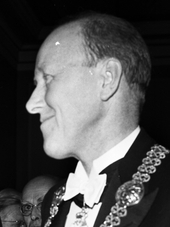
- Segerstedt in 1957
- Born: Torgny Torgnysson Segerstedt; 11 August 1908; Mellerud, Sweden
- Died: 28 January 1999 (aged 90); Uppsala, Sweden
- Occupations: philosopher, sociologist, university teacher
- Employer: Uppsala University
- Spouse: Marie-Louise Segerstedt
- Parent: Torgny Segerstedt (father)
- Relatives: Ingrid Segerstedt Wiberg (sister)
- Awards: Kellgren Award (1993)

Member of the Swedish Academy (Seat No. 2)
- In office 20 December 1975 – 28 January 1999
- Preceded by: Ingvar Andersson
- Succeeded by: Bo Ralph

Torgny T. Segerstedt (11 August 1908 – 28 January 1999) was a Swedish philosopher and sociologist.

== Biography ==
Torgny T. Segerstedt was born at Mellerud, in Holm parish, Älvsborg County, Sweden. He was the son of Torgny Segerstedt (1876–1945), scholar of comparative religion who taught at Lund University and publicist remembered especially for his uncompromising anti-Nazi stance. He grew up in Stockholm and from 1917, when his father became editor of Göteborgs Handels- och Sjöfartstidning, in Gothenburg.

After completing his secondary education at Göteborgs högre samskola, Segerstedt matriculated at Lund University in 1927, and, after receiving his Licentiate in 1931 and studying in Paris and London, completed his Ph.D. in practical philosophy in 1934. Segerstedt's dissertation was Value and reality in Bradley’s philosophy and his following studies were also dedicated to the study of English and Scottish philosophy. His direction towards moral philosophy and influences from research in other fields, such as cultural anthropology and sociolinguistics, brought him closer to the field of sociology.

After a few years of teaching in Lund, he was appointed to the chair of philosophy in Uppsala in 1938, and then to a new chair in sociology in 1948; this was the first professorial chair in that discipline at a Swedish university. He served as rector magnificus of the university from 1955 to 1978. As rector of Uppsala University for 23 years, he led it through the most significant period of expansion and reform in its history and presided over its 500th anniversary in 1977. He retired in 1978 and was succeeded as rector by Martin H:son Holmdahl.

He was a member of numerous academies and learned societies, including the Swedish Academy from 1975. On 2 June 1978 Segerstedt received an honorary doctorate from the Faculty of Pharmacy at Uppsala University. He was awarded the Illis quorum in 1978.

Cultural offices
Preceded by Ingvar Andersson	Swedish Academy, Chair No 2; 1975-1999	Succeeded by Bo Ralph
Academic offices
Preceded by Åke Holmbäck	Rector of Uppsala University; 1 July 1955 – 30 June 1978	Succeeded by Martin H:son Holmdahl
