= P3 Dokumentär =

- Genre: Documentary
- Country of origin: Sweden
- Language: Swedish
- Home station: Sveriges Radio P3
- Original release: 2004
- Website: https://sverigesradio.se/sida/default.aspx?programid=2519
- Podcast: https://api.sr.se/api/rss/pod/3966

P3 Dokumentär is a Swedish radio show broadcast by Sveriges Radio P3 created by Kristofer Hansson and Fredrik Johnsson. The show looks back in history by digging into archives and interviewing people who were present at the time and place of the event. The events takes place in Swedish contemporary history and the topics range from international political scandal to lesser local topics.

== About P3 Dokumentär ==
P3 Dokumentär was created by Kristofer Hansson and Fredrik Johnsson. The first documentary was aired in the spring of 2004 on the topic of the assassination of Olof Palme. It was aired on the show Frispel broadcast by Sveriges Radio P3. During 2005 the show was aired during national holidays such as easter and the National Day of Sweden. In 2006 the show was given its own spot on the schedule.

The show has been nominated for the award Stora Radiopriset on several occasions and has been given the title Podradio of the year three years in a row by the website podradio.nu. In 2009 P3 Dokumentär was awarded Stora Radiopriset in the category "Public Service of the year (2009)".

In 2011 P3 Dokumentär was awarded the Lars Salvius award.

P3 Dokumentär tells its stories from a Swedish perspective on contemporary history, the humans behind the headlines and tries to contextualize important event. The sister show P3 Dokumentär Special is similar but the events takes place outside of Sweden. Yet another sister show, P3 Dokumentär Världen started broadcasting on 25 July 2010.

The leitmotif of P3 dokumentär is the song "Marathon" by the producer Embee from the album Long distance runner by Promoe.
