= Fenriskjeften Mountain =

Mountain in Antarctica

Coordinates: 71°53′S 8°18′E

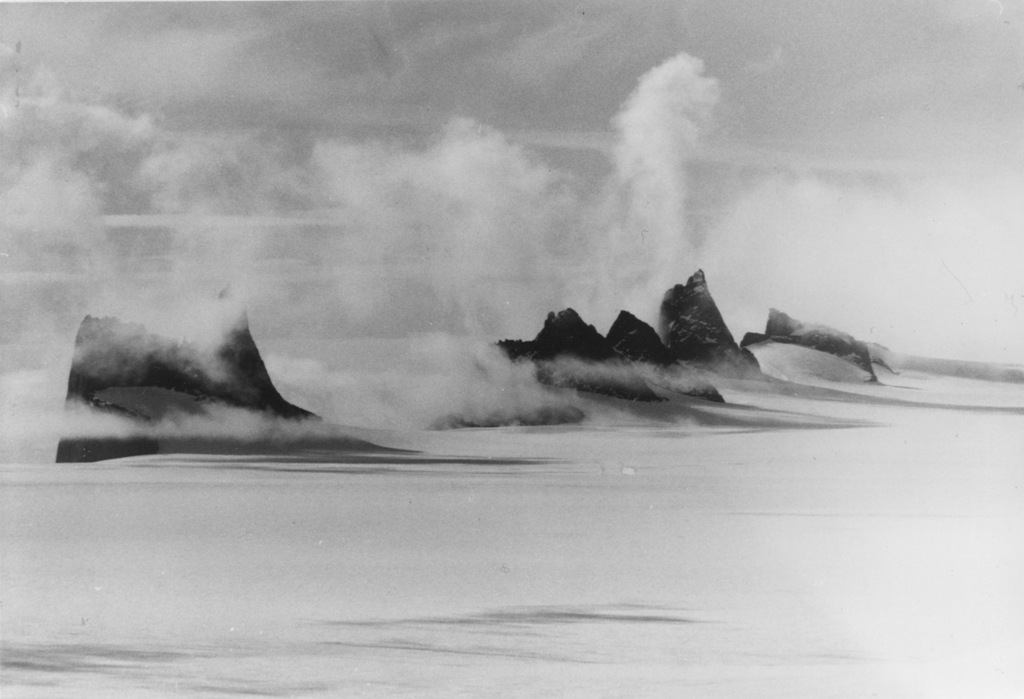
Fenriskjeften covered by fog

Fenriskjeften Mountain is a large bare rock mountain which in plan resembles a hairpin, forming the southern portion of the Drygalski Mountains in Queen Maud Land, Antarctica. It was plotted from air photos by the Third German Antarctic Expedition (1938–39), mapped from surveys and air photos by the Sixth Norwegian Antarctic Expedition (1956–60), and because of its shape named Fenriskjeften (Fenrir's jaw), after the wolf in Norse mythology.

== See also ==
- Fenristunga
