= Vasagatan (Gothenburg) =

Street in Gothenburg, Sweden

Coordinates: 57°42′0″N 11°58′25″E

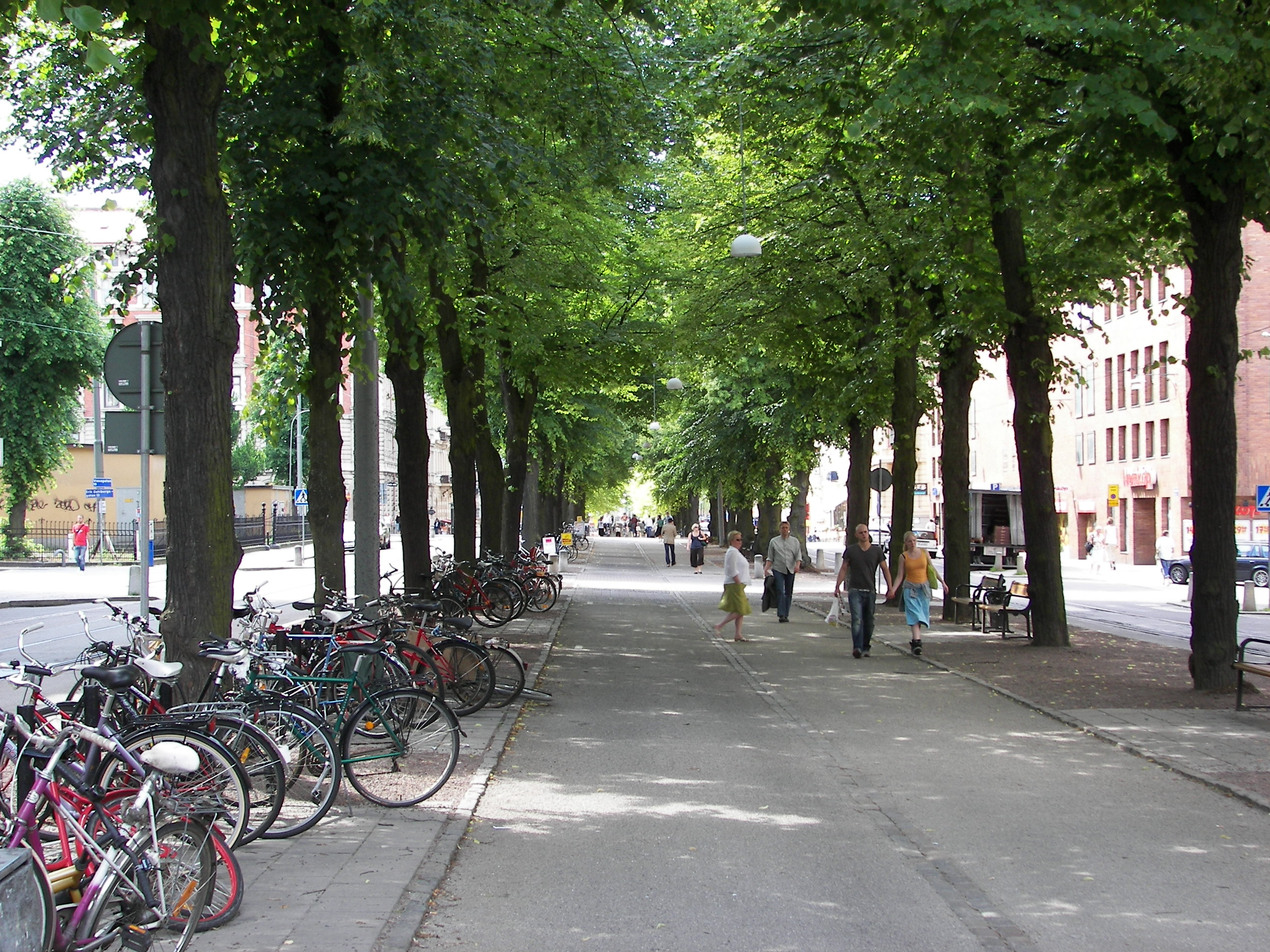
Vasagatan near Vasaplatsen, summer 2006

Vasagatan is a major street in central Gothenburg named after King Gustav Vasa. It stretches from Sprängkullsgatan in west to Heden in east.

Along it are well known establishments like the Röhsska Museum, University of Gothenburg and Gothenburg School of Economics and Commercial Law. The street is known for its many cafés, and it has several restaurants. It is said to have the most dense bicycle traffic in Gothenburg. The street crosses Kungsportsavenyn, and this crossing is the midpoint of nightlife in Gothenburg.
