= Ingrid Segerstedt Wiberg =

Swedish journalist and politician

Member of the Riksdag for City of Gothenburg
- In office 1958–1970

Personal details
- Born: 18 June 1911 Lund, Sweden
- Died: 21 May 2010 (aged 98) Gothenburg, Sweden
- Party: People's Party

Ingrid Segerstedt Wiberg (18 June 1911 – 21 May 2010) was a Swedish journalist and politician. She was a prominent activist for freedom of speech, peace, human rights and the care of refugees.

== Biography ==
Segerstedt Wiberg was born in Lund, Sweden as the second child of Norgwegian born Augusta Wilhelmina Synnestvedt (1874–1934) and Swedish journalist Torgny Segerstedt (1876–1945). Her brother Torgny T. Segerstedt (1908–1999) served as was Vice-Chancellor of the Uppsala University between 1955 and 1978.

When Segerstedt Wiberg was one year old, the family moved to Stockholm and later on to Gothenburg in 1917, when her father became editor in chief for the newspaper Göteborgs Handels- och Sjöfartstidning.

Between 1958 and 1970 Segerstedt Wiberg was a member of the Riksdag representing the Liberal People's Party.

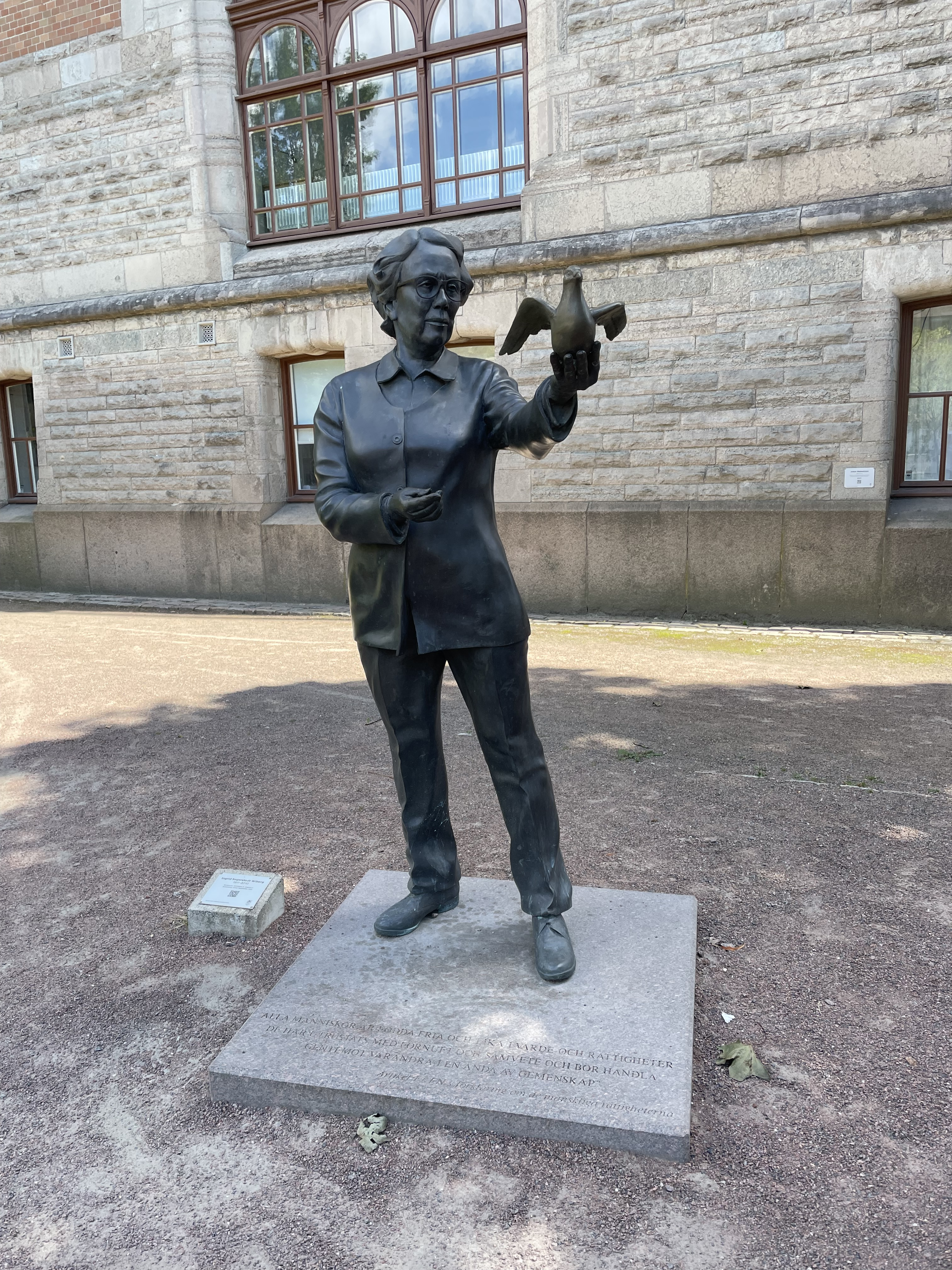
Statue of Ingrid Segerstedt Wiberg in Gothenburg/Sweden

She served as chairman of the Swedish section of the Women's International League for Peace and Freedom from 1975 to 1981.
