= Torgny Segerstedt =

Swedish professor and scholar

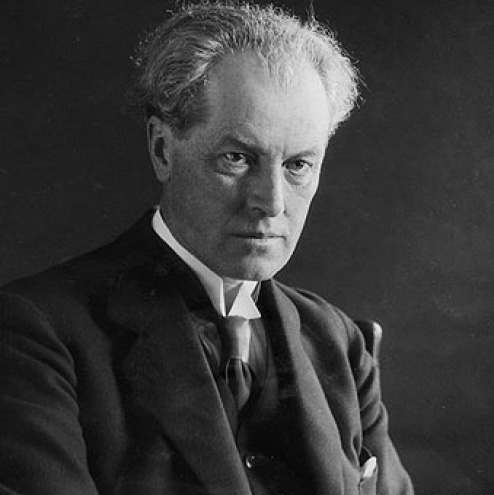
Torgny Segerstedt

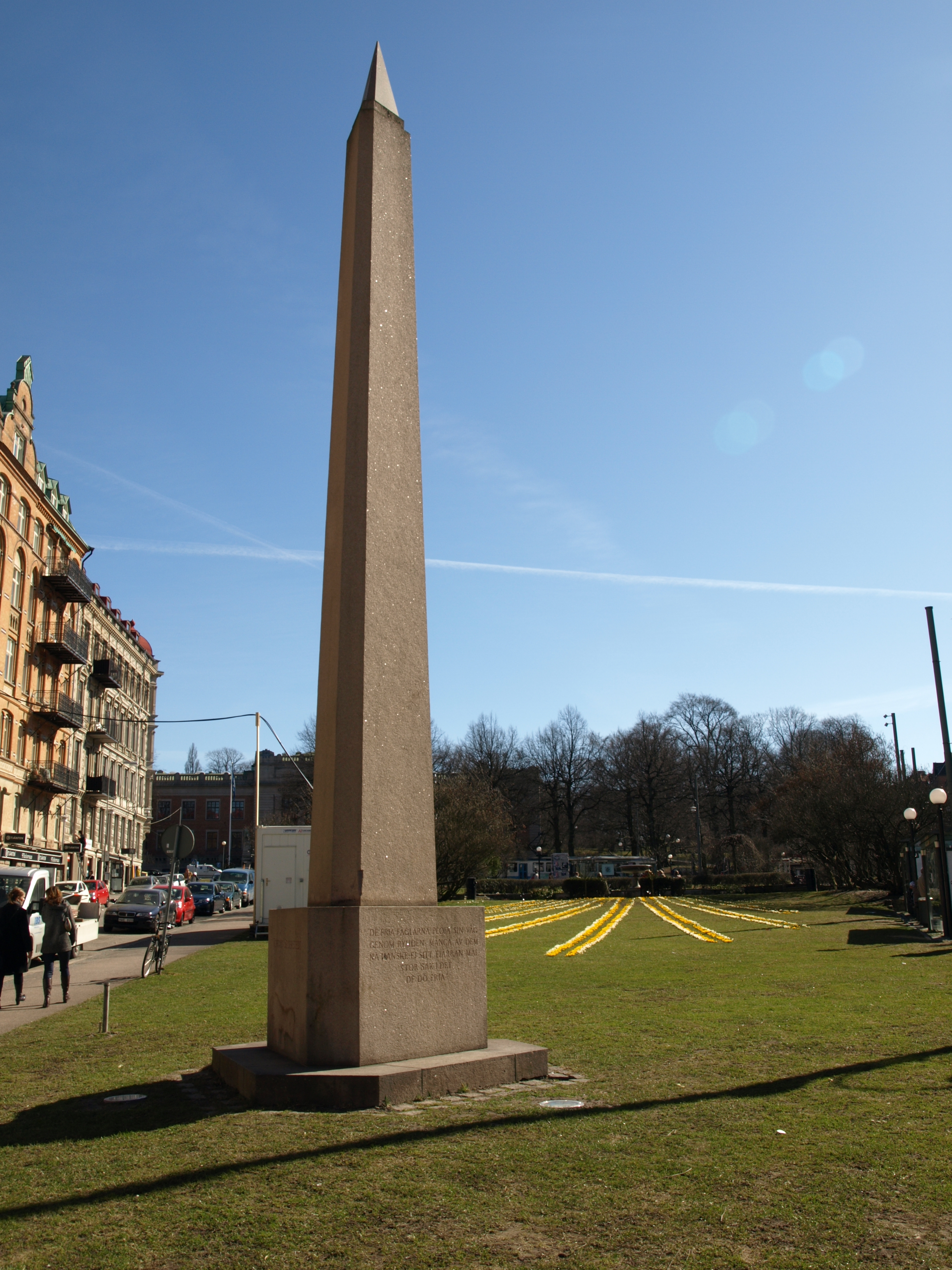
Torgny Segerstedt monument at Vasaplatsen, Gothenburg

Torgny Karl Segerstedt (1 November 1876 – 31 March 1945) was a Swedish professor and scholar of comparative religion, who later became editor-in-chief of the newspaper Göteborgs Handels- och Sjöfartstidning. He is most remembered for his uncompromising anti-Nazi stance and his efforts to alert the Swedish public to the threat of Fascism during the 1930s.

== Biography ==
Torgny Segerstedt was born at Karlstad in Värmland County, Sweden. He was the son of the teacher and publicist Albrekt Segerstedt (1844–1894) and Fredrika Sofia Bohman (died 1884). He earned a cand.theol. degree from Lund University in 1901 and in 1903 he became a lecturer in the history of religion. He was a lecturer in theological encyclopedics at Lund University from 1904 to 1912. He was awarded a doctor of theology in 1912. He was professor in the history of religions at Stockholm University from 1913 to 1917.

Torgny Segerstedt was editor-in-chief of the Gothenburg newspaper Göteborgs Handels- och Sjöfartstidning from 1917 until his death in 1945. After the rise of Adolf Hitler to power in Nazi Germany, the newspaper became the leading Swedish publication dedicated to the German struggle against Nazism. Throughout World War II, he remained an opponent to the Swedish government policies of concessions to Nazi Germany.

== Personal life ==
Torgny Segerstedt married his Norwegian born wife Augusta Wilhelmina Synnestvedt (1874–1934) in 1905. Their children were the philosopher and sociologist Torgny Segerstedt (1908–1999) and the journalist and politician Ingrid Segerstedt Wiberg (1911–2010). Segerstedt died in Gothenburg during 1945 and was buried at Kvibergs kyrkogård.

== Legacy ==
In 1955, the Torgny Segerstedt monument was unveiled at Vasaplatsen in Gothenburg. The ten-meter high, triangular monolith of granite was designed by Swedish sculptor Ivar Johnsson (1885–1970).

He was posthumously awarded the Illis quorum by the Swedish government in 1977.

The Torgny Segerstedt Foundation (Stiftelsen Torgny Segerstedts Minne) was founded in 1996 and was inaugurated by his daughter Ingrid Segerstedt-Wiberg. The foundation funds a visiting professorship at the University of Gothenburg.

Torgny Segerstedt was the subject of the 2012 Swedish film, The Last Sentence (Dom över död man). The story was based on the journalistic career of Segerstedt. It was directed by Swedish film director Jan Troell and featured the Danish actor Jesper Christensen in the role of Torgny Segerstedt.

== Other sources ==
- Anders Johnson (2006) Ett porträtt av Torgny Segerstedt – Personligheten och hjordinstinten (Göteborg: Tre Böcker Förlag AB) ISBN 9170296022
