= Vasaplatsen, Gothenburg =

Public square in Gothenburg, Sweden

Coordinates: 57°41′59″N 11°58′09″E

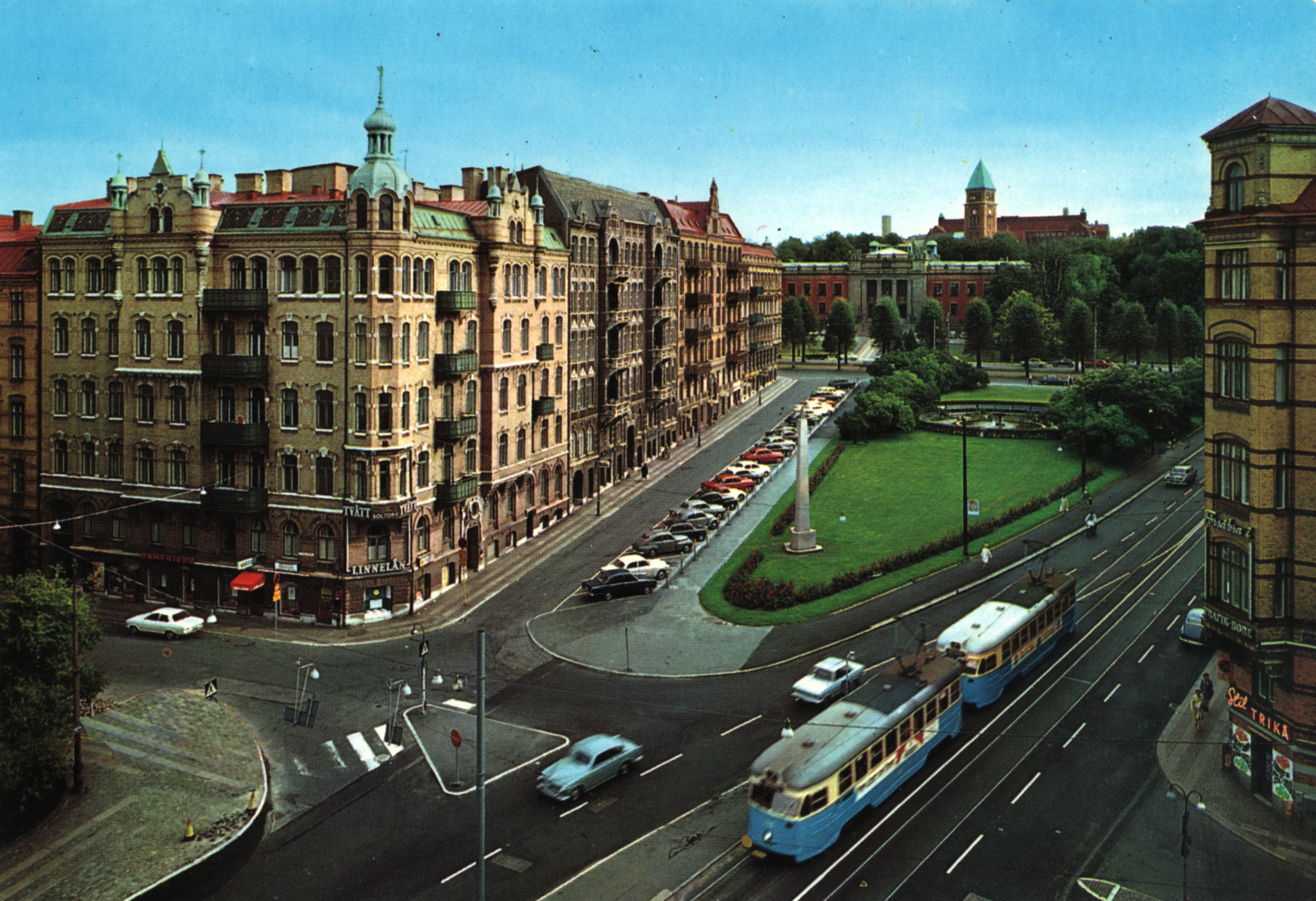
Postcard depicting an overview of the square, c. 1965. Photographed by Dino Sassi, published by Sa-mar AB.

Vasaplatsen is a public square in the city of Gothenburg, Sweden. Located in the central disctricts, the combined tram and bus stop serves as a minor hub of public transport. Adjacent is the Vasa Park and the University of Gothenburg main administrative building.

The square was opened to the public in 1897. A fountain was later installed the same year. On 31 March 1955, the Monument of Torgny Segerstedt was unveiled. In 1992, 13 people died after a tram derailed and crashed into the nearby stop.
