= Göteborgs Handels- och Sjöfartstidning =

Swedish newspaper

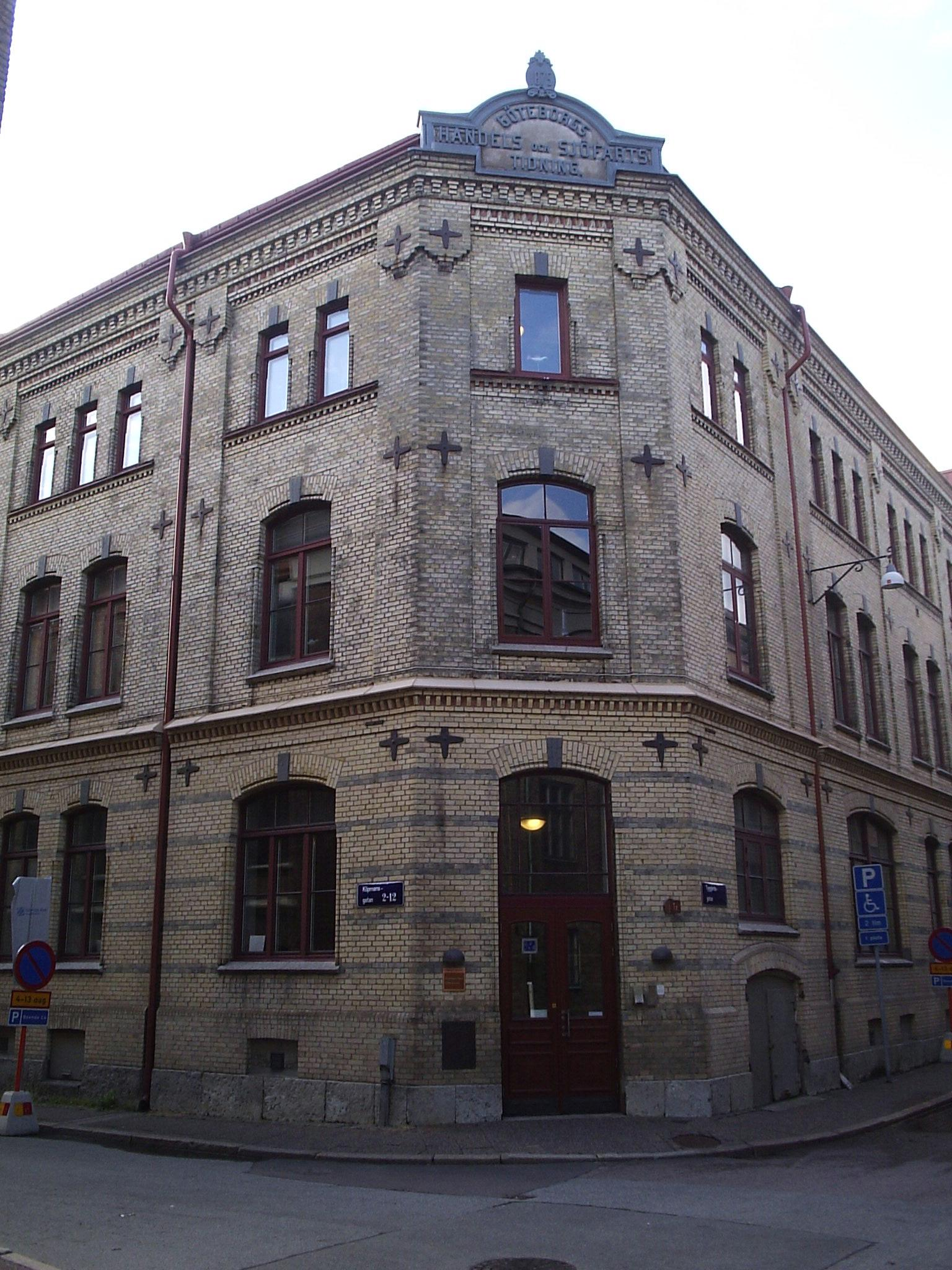
The building in which the newspaper had its office

Göteborgs Handels- och Sjöfartstidning (GHT) was a daily newspaper published in Gothenburg, Sweden, from 1832 to 1985.

== History and profile ==
Göteborgs Handels- och Sjöfartstidning was founded in 1832 by publisher Magnus Prytz and had a liberal alignment from the later part of the 19th century after Sven Adolf Hedlund became editor in 1852. The author Viktor Rydberg worked for the newspaper and several of his novels were published as series in the paper.

During World War II, GHT was one of the few Swedish newspapers that held a decidedly anti-Nazi profile, which made its editor-in-chief (since 1917) Torgny Segerstedt a controversial figure in neutral Sweden. The Norwegian illustrator Ragnvald Blix became known for his anti-Nazi caricatures published in the paper during that time under the pseudonym "Stig Höök". After the war the paper's liberal traditions were continued with journalism noted by distinguished foreign reporting and a daily cultural section prominent in the Nordic press. In 1973 the paper closed, but re-appeared as a weekly publication in 1975-1984, and then briefly again as a daily newspaper before it finally ceased publication in 1985.
