= List of Gothenburg Tramway stops =

System map of the tramway network, until December 2024 (outdated). See official map.

The following list includes tram stops in service of the Gothenburg Tramway. As of December 2024, there are 132 stops on 11 regular lines.

== List of stops ==
Name	Services	Notes
Allhelgonakyrkan	Line 6 (Gothenburg Tramway) Line 7 (Gothenburg Tramway) Line 11 (Gothenburg Tramway)	
Almedal	Line 4 (Gothenburg Tramway) Line 12 (Gothenburg Tramway)	
Angered Centrum	Line 4 (Gothenburg Tramway) Line 8 (Gothenburg Tramway) Line 9 (Gothenburg Tramway)	Terminus of Line 4, Line 8, and Line 9.
Aprilgatan	Line 6 (Gothenburg Tramway)	Terminus of Line 6.
Axel Dahlströms Torg	Line 1 (Gothenburg Tramway) Line 2 (Gothenburg Tramway) Line 7 (Gothenburg Tramway) Line 8 (Gothenburg Tramway)	Terminus of Line 2.
Bellevue	Line 6 (Gothenburg Tramway) Line 7 (Gothenburg Tramway) Line 11 (Gothenburg Tramway)	
Berzeliigatan	Line 4 (Gothenburg Tramway) Line 5 (Gothenburg Tramway)	
Beväringsgatan	Line 6 (Gothenburg Tramway) Line 7 (Gothenburg Tramway) Line 11 (Gothenburg Tramway)	
Bokekullsgatan	Line 3 (Gothenburg Tramway)	
Botaniska Trädgården	Line 1 (Gothenburg Tramway) Line 2 (Gothenburg Tramway) Line 7 (Gothenburg Tramway) Line 8 (Gothenburg Tramway)	
Briljantgatan	Line 1 (Gothenburg Tramway) Line 7 (Gothenburg Tramway)	
Brunnsgatan	Line 2 (Gothenburg Tramway)	
Brunnsparken	Line 1 (Gothenburg Tramway) Line 2 (Gothenburg Tramway) Line 3 (Gothenburg Tramway) Line 4 (Gothenburg Tramway) Line 5 (Gothenburg Tramway) Line 6 (Gothenburg Tramway) Line 7 (Gothenburg Tramway) Line 9 (Gothenburg Tramway) Line 10 (Gothenburg Tramway) Line 11 (Gothenburg Tramway)	
Bögatan	Line 5 (Gothenburg Tramway)	
Centralstationen	Line 1 (Gothenburg Tramway) Line 3 (Gothenburg Tramway) Line 4 (Gothenburg Tramway) Line 7 (Gothenburg Tramway) Line 9 (Gothenburg Tramway) Line 11 (Gothenburg Tramway) Line 12 (Gothenburg Tramway)	
Chalmers	Line 6 (Gothenburg Tramway) Line 7 (Gothenburg Tramway) Line 8 (Gothenburg Tramway) Line 10 (Gothenburg Tramway)	
Chapmans Torg	Line 3 (Gothenburg Tramway) Line 9 (Gothenburg Tramway)	
Doktor Fries Torg	Line 10 (Gothenburg Tramway)	
Doktor Sydows Gata	Line 10 (Gothenburg Tramway)	
Domkyrkan	Line 2 (Gothenburg Tramway) Line 6 (Gothenburg Tramway) Line 9 (Gothenburg Tramway)	
Ejdergatan	Line 6 (Gothenburg Tramway) Line 8 (Gothenburg Tramway)	
Ekedal	Line 11 (Gothenburg Tramway)	
Eketrägatan	Line 2 (Gothenburg Tramway) Line 5 (Gothenburg Tramway) Line 6 (Gothenburg Tramway)	
Ekmanska	Line 5 (Gothenburg Tramway)	
Elisedal	Line 4 (Gothenburg Tramway) Line 12 (Gothenburg Tramway)	
Fjällgatan	Line 11 (Gothenburg Tramway)	
Frihamnen	Line 2 (Gothenburg Tramway) Line 5 (Gothenburg Tramway) Line 6 (Gothenburg Tramway)	
Friskväderstorget	Line 2 (Gothenburg Tramway) Line 5 (Gothenburg Tramway) Line 6 (Gothenburg Tramway)	
Frölunda Torg	Line 1 (Gothenburg Tramway) Line 7 (Gothenburg Tramway) Line 8 (Gothenburg Tramway)	Terminus of Line 8.
Galileis Gata	Line 7 (Gothenburg Tramway) Line 11 (Gothenburg Tramway)	
Gamlestads Torg	Line 4 (Gothenburg Tramway) Line 6 (Gothenburg Tramway) Line 7 (Gothenburg Tramway) Line 8 (Gothenburg Tramway) Line 9 (Gothenburg Tramway) Line 11 (Gothenburg Tramway)	
Godhemsgatan	Line 3 (Gothenburg Tramway) Line 11 (Gothenburg Tramway)	
Gropegårdsgatan	Line 2 (Gothenburg Tramway) Line 5 (Gothenburg Tramway) Line 6 (Gothenburg Tramway)	
Grönsakstorget	Line 2 (Gothenburg Tramway) Line 6 (Gothenburg Tramway) Line 9 (Gothenburg Tramway)	
Hagakyrkan	Line 3 (Gothenburg Tramway) Line 6 (Gothenburg Tramway) Line 9 (Gothenburg Tramway)	
Hagen	Line 11 (Gothenburg Tramway)	
Hammarkullen	Line 4 (Gothenburg Tramway) Line 8 (Gothenburg Tramway) Line 9 (Gothenburg Tramway)	
Handelshögskolan	Line 2 (Gothenburg Tramway)	
Hinsholmen	Line 11 (Gothenburg Tramway)	
Hjalmar Brantingsplatsen	Line 2 (Gothenburg Tramway) Line 5 (Gothenburg Tramway) Line 6 (Gothenburg Tramway)	
Hjällbo	Line 4 (Gothenburg Tramway) Line 8 (Gothenburg Tramway) Line 9 (Gothenburg Tramway)	
Härlanda	Line 1 (Gothenburg Tramway) Line 3 (Gothenburg Tramway)	
Högsbogatan	Line 3 (Gothenburg Tramway)	
Jaegerdorffsplatsen	Line 3 (Gothenburg Tramway) Line 9 (Gothenburg Tramway)	
Januarigatan	Line 7 (Gothenburg Tramway) Line 11 (Gothenburg Tramway)	
Jubileumsparken	Line 10 (Gothenburg Tramway) Line 12 (Gothenburg Tramway)	
Järntorget	Line 1 (Gothenburg Tramway) Line 3 (Gothenburg Tramway) Line 6 (Gothenburg Tramway) Line 9 (Gothenburg Tramway) Line 11 (Gothenburg Tramway)	
Kaggeledstorget	Line 1 (Gothenburg Tramway) Line 5 (Gothenburg Tramway)	
Kapellplatsen	Line 7 (Gothenburg Tramway) Line 10 (Gothenburg Tramway)	
Kaptensgatan	Line 3 (Gothenburg Tramway) Line 9 (Gothenburg Tramway)	
Klintens Väg	Line 3 (Gothenburg Tramway)	
Komettorget	Line 7 (Gothenburg Tramway) Line 11 (Gothenburg Tramway)	Terminus of Line 7 and Line 11.
Korsvägen	Line 4 (Gothenburg Tramway) Line 5 (Gothenburg Tramway) Line 6 (Gothenburg Tramway) Line 8 (Gothenburg Tramway) Line 12 (Gothenburg Tramway)	
Kortedala Torg	Line 6 (Gothenburg Tramway) Line 7 (Gothenburg Tramway) Line 11 (Gothenburg Tramway)	
Krokslätts Fabriker	Line 4 (Gothenburg Tramway) Line 12 (Gothenburg Tramway)	
Krokslätts Torg	Line 4 (Gothenburg Tramway) Line 12 (Gothenburg Tramway)	
Kungsportsplatsen	Line 3 (Gothenburg Tramway) Line 4 (Gothenburg Tramway) Line 5 (Gothenburg Tramway) Line 7 (Gothenburg Tramway) Line 10 (Gothenburg Tramway)	
Kungssten	Line 9 (Gothenburg Tramway) Line 11 (Gothenburg Tramway)	Terminus of Line 9.
Kviberg	Line 6 (Gothenburg Tramway) Line 7 (Gothenburg Tramway) Line 11 (Gothenburg Tramway)	
Käringberget	Line 11 (Gothenburg Tramway)	
Lackarebäck	Line 4 (Gothenburg Tramway) Line 12 (Gothenburg Tramway)	
Lana	Line 4 (Gothenburg Tramway) Line 12 (Gothenburg Tramway)	
Lantmilsgatan	Line 1 (Gothenburg Tramway) Line 7 (Gothenburg Tramway) Line 8 (Gothenburg Tramway)	
Lilla Bommen	Line 5 (Gothenburg Tramway) Line 10 (Gothenburg Tramway)	
Lindholmen	Line 10 (Gothenburg Tramway) Line 12 (Gothenburg Tramway)	Terminus of Line 10 and Line 12.
Linnéplatsen	Line 1 (Gothenburg Tramway) Line 2 (Gothenburg Tramway) Line 6 (Gothenburg Tramway)	
Liseberg Station	Line 5 (Gothenburg Tramway)	
Liseberg Södra	Line 4 (Gothenburg Tramway) Line 12 (Gothenburg Tramway)	
Långedrag	Line 11 (Gothenburg Tramway)	
Majvallen	Line 11 (Gothenburg Tramway)	
Mariaplan	Line 3 (Gothenburg Tramway) Line 11 (Gothenburg Tramway)	
Marklandsgatan	Line 1 (Gothenburg Tramway) Line 2 (Gothenburg Tramway) Line 3 (Gothenburg Tramway) Line 7 (Gothenburg Tramway) Line 8 (Gothenburg Tramway)	Terminus of Line 3.
Masthuggstorget	Line 3 (Gothenburg Tramway) Line 9 (Gothenburg Tramway) Line 11 (Gothenburg Tramway)	
Medicinaregatan	Line 6 (Gothenburg Tramway) Line 7 (Gothenburg Tramway) Line 8 (Gothenburg Tramway)	
Mildvädersgatan	Line 2 (Gothenburg Tramway) Line 5 (Gothenburg Tramway) Line 6 (Gothenburg Tramway)	
Munkebäckstorget	Line 1 (Gothenburg Tramway) Line 5 (Gothenburg Tramway)	
Musikvägen	Line 1 (Gothenburg Tramway) Line 7 (Gothenburg Tramway) Line 8 (Gothenburg Tramway)	
Mölndals Innerstad	Line 4 (Gothenburg Tramway) Line 12 (Gothenburg Tramway)	Terminus of Line 4 and Line 12.
Mölndals Sjukhus	Line 4 (Gothenburg Tramway) Line 12 (Gothenburg Tramway)	
Nordstan	Line 2 (Gothenburg Tramway) Line 6 (Gothenburg Tramway) Line 12 (Gothenburg Tramway)	
Nya Varvsallén	Line 11 (Gothenburg Tramway)	
Nymilsgatan	Line 1 (Gothenburg Tramway) Line 7 (Gothenburg Tramway) Line 8 (Gothenburg Tramway)	
Nymånegatan	Line 6 (Gothenburg Tramway) Line 7 (Gothenburg Tramway) Line 11 (Gothenburg Tramway)	
Olivedalsgatan	Line 1 (Gothenburg Tramway) Line 2 (Gothenburg Tramway) Line 6 (Gothenburg Tramway)	
Olskrokstorget	Line 1 (Gothenburg Tramway) Line 3 (Gothenburg Tramway) Line 6 (Gothenburg Tramway) Line 8 (Gothenburg Tramway)	
Opaltorget	Line 1 (Gothenburg Tramway) Line 7 (Gothenburg Tramway)	Terminus of Line 1 and Line 7.
Ostindiegatan	Line 3 (Gothenburg Tramway) Line 9 (Gothenburg Tramway)	
Positivgatan	Line 1 (Gothenburg Tramway) Line 7 (Gothenburg Tramway) Line 8 (Gothenburg Tramway)	
Prinsgatan	Line 1 (Gothenburg Tramway) Line 6 (Gothenburg Tramway)	
Pumpgatan	Line 10 (Gothenburg Tramway) Line 12 (Gothenburg Tramway)	
Rambergsvallen	Line 2 (Gothenburg Tramway) Line 5 (Gothenburg Tramway) Line 6 (Gothenburg Tramway)	
Redbergsplatsen	Line 1 (Gothenburg Tramway) Line 3 (Gothenburg Tramway) Line 6 (Gothenburg Tramway) Line 8 (Gothenburg Tramway)	
Runstavsgatan	Line 6 (Gothenburg Tramway) Line 7 (Gothenburg Tramway) Line 11 (Gothenburg Tramway)	
Rymdtorget	Line 7 (Gothenburg Tramway) Line 11 (Gothenburg Tramway)	
Sahlgrenska Huvudentré	Line 6 (Gothenburg Tramway) Line 7 (Gothenburg Tramway) Line 8 (Gothenburg Tramway)	
Saltholmen	Line 11 (Gothenburg Tramway)	Terminus of Line 11.
Sanatoriegatan	Line 3 (Gothenburg Tramway) Line 5 (Gothenburg Tramway)	
Sandarna	Line 9 (Gothenburg Tramway) Line 11 (Gothenburg Tramway)	
Sankt Sigfrids Plan	Line 5 (Gothenburg Tramway)	
Sannaplan	Line 9 (Gothenburg Tramway) Line 11 (Gothenburg Tramway)	
Scandinavium	Line 6 (Gothenburg Tramway) Line 8 (Gothenburg Tramway) Line 12 (Gothenburg Tramway)	
Seminariegatan	Line 2 (Gothenburg Tramway)	
SKF	Line 6 (Gothenburg Tramway) Line 7 (Gothenburg Tramway) Line 8 (Gothenburg Tramway)	
Smaragdgatan	Line 1 (Gothenburg Tramway) Line 7 (Gothenburg Tramway)	
Solrosgatan	Line 3 (Gothenburg Tramway) Line 5 (Gothenburg Tramway)	
Stenpiren	Line 1 (Gothenburg Tramway) Line 11 (Gothenburg Tramway)	
Stigbergstorget	Line 3 (Gothenburg Tramway) Line 9 (Gothenburg Tramway) Line 11 (Gothenburg Tramway)	
Stockholmsgatan	Line 1 (Gothenburg Tramway) Line 3 (Gothenburg Tramway)	
Storås	Line 4 (Gothenburg Tramway) Line 8 (Gothenburg Tramway) Line 9 (Gothenburg Tramway)	
Svingeln	Line 1 (Gothenburg Tramway) Line 3 (Gothenburg Tramway) Line 6 (Gothenburg Tramway) Line 8 (Gothenburg Tramway)	
Sälöfjordsgatan	Line 2 (Gothenburg Tramway) Line 5 (Gothenburg Tramway) Line 6 (Gothenburg Tramway)	
Teleskopgatan	Line 7 (Gothenburg Tramway) Line 11 (Gothenburg Tramway)	
Temperaturgatan	Line 5 (Gothenburg Tramway) Line 6 (Gothenburg Tramway)	
Tingvallsvägen	Line 1 (Gothenburg Tramway) Line 5 (Gothenburg Tramway)	
Tranered	Line 11 (Gothenburg Tramway)	
Töpelsgatan	Line 5 (Gothenburg Tramway)	
Ullevi Norra	Line 1 (Gothenburg Tramway) Line 3 (Gothenburg Tramway) Line 6 (Gothenburg Tramway) Line 8 (Gothenburg Tramway)	
Ullevi Södra	Line 6 (Gothenburg Tramway) Line 8 (Gothenburg Tramway) Line 12 (Gothenburg Tramway)	
Vagnhallen Majorna	Line 3 (Gothenburg Tramway) Line 9 (Gothenburg Tramway)	
Valand	Line 3 (Gothenburg Tramway) Line 4 (Gothenburg Tramway) Line 5 (Gothenburg Tramway) Line 7 (Gothenburg Tramway) Line 10 (Gothenburg Tramway)	
Varbergsgatan	Line 4 (Gothenburg Tramway) Line 12 (Gothenburg Tramway)	
Varmfrontsgatan	Line 5 (Gothenburg Tramway) Line 6 (Gothenburg Tramway)	Terminus of Line 5 and Line 6.
Vasa Viktoriagatan	Line 2 (Gothenburg Tramway) Line 3 (Gothenburg Tramway)	
Vasaplatsen	Line 2 (Gothenburg Tramway) Line 3 (Gothenburg Tramway) Line 7 (Gothenburg Tramway) Line 10 (Gothenburg Tramway)	
Virginsgatan	Line 3 (Gothenburg Tramway) Line 5 (Gothenburg Tramway)	Terminus of Line 3.
Väderilsgatan	Line 2 (Gothenburg Tramway) Line 5 (Gothenburg Tramway) Line 6 (Gothenburg Tramway)	Terminus of Line 2.
Vågmästareplatsen	Line 2 (Gothenburg Tramway) Line 5 (Gothenburg Tramway) Line 6 (Gothenburg Tramway)	
Vårväderstorget	Line 2 (Gothenburg Tramway) Line 5 (Gothenburg Tramway) Line 6 (Gothenburg Tramway)	
Wavrinskys Plats	Line 6 (Gothenburg Tramway) Line 7 (Gothenburg Tramway) Line 8 (Gothenburg Tramway) Line 10 (Gothenburg Tramway)	
Welandergatan	Line 5 (Gothenburg Tramway)	
Wieselgrensplatsen	Line 2 (Gothenburg Tramway) Line 5 (Gothenburg Tramway) Line 6 (Gothenburg Tramway)	
Önskevädersgatan	Line 2 (Gothenburg Tramway) Line 5 (Gothenburg Tramway) Line 6 (Gothenburg Tramway)	
Östra Sjukhuset	Line 1 (Gothenburg Tramway) Line 5 (Gothenburg Tramway)	Terminus of Line 1 and Line 5.

== See also ==
- List of Stockholm Metro stations
- List of Norrköping Tramway stops
