= Stigbergstorget tram stop =

Tram station in Gothenburg, Sweden

Stigbergstorget
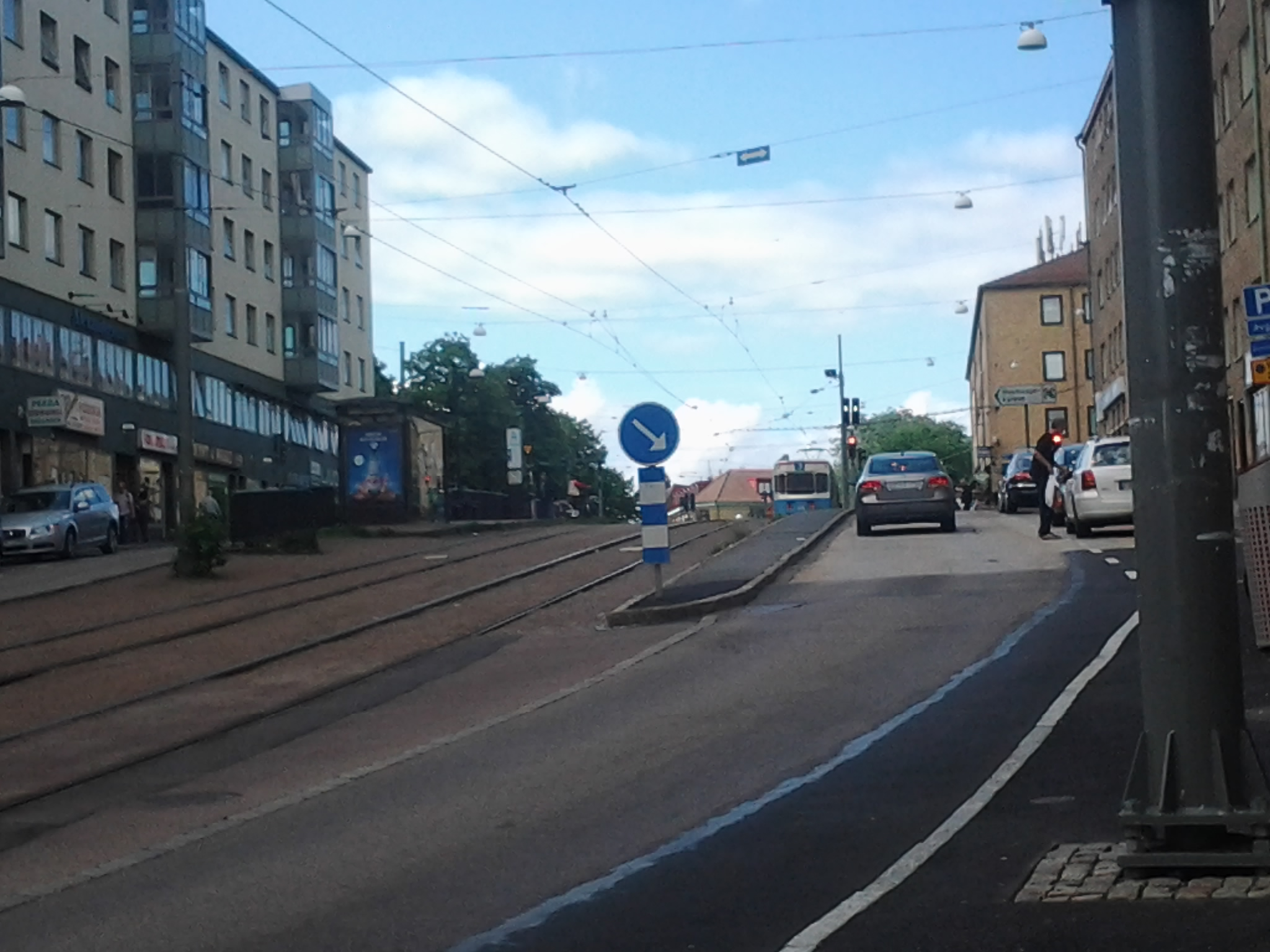
- Stigbergsliden part

General information
- Location: Platform A: Stigbergsliden, 21; Platform B: Stigbergstorget, 2 Platform C: Bangatan, 6 Sweden
- System: Gothenburg tram network stop
- Platforms: 3
- Tracks: 3

Construction
- Parking: No
Location

Stigbergstorget tram stop is a tram stop in Gothenburg (Stigberget). After until Ostindiegatan it splits. Lines 3 and 9 go via Chapmans Torg and Vagnhallen Majorna. Line 11 goes via Majvallen.

Kålltorp		Marklandsgatan
Masthuggstorget	Stigbergstorget	Kaptensgatan
Angered Centrum		Kungssten
Masthuggstorget	Stigbergstorget	Kaptensgatan
Komettorget		Saltholmen
Masthuggstorget	Stigbergstorget	Fjällgatan
