= Vagnhallen Majorna tram stop =

Tram station in Gothenburg, Sweden

Vagnhallen Majorna
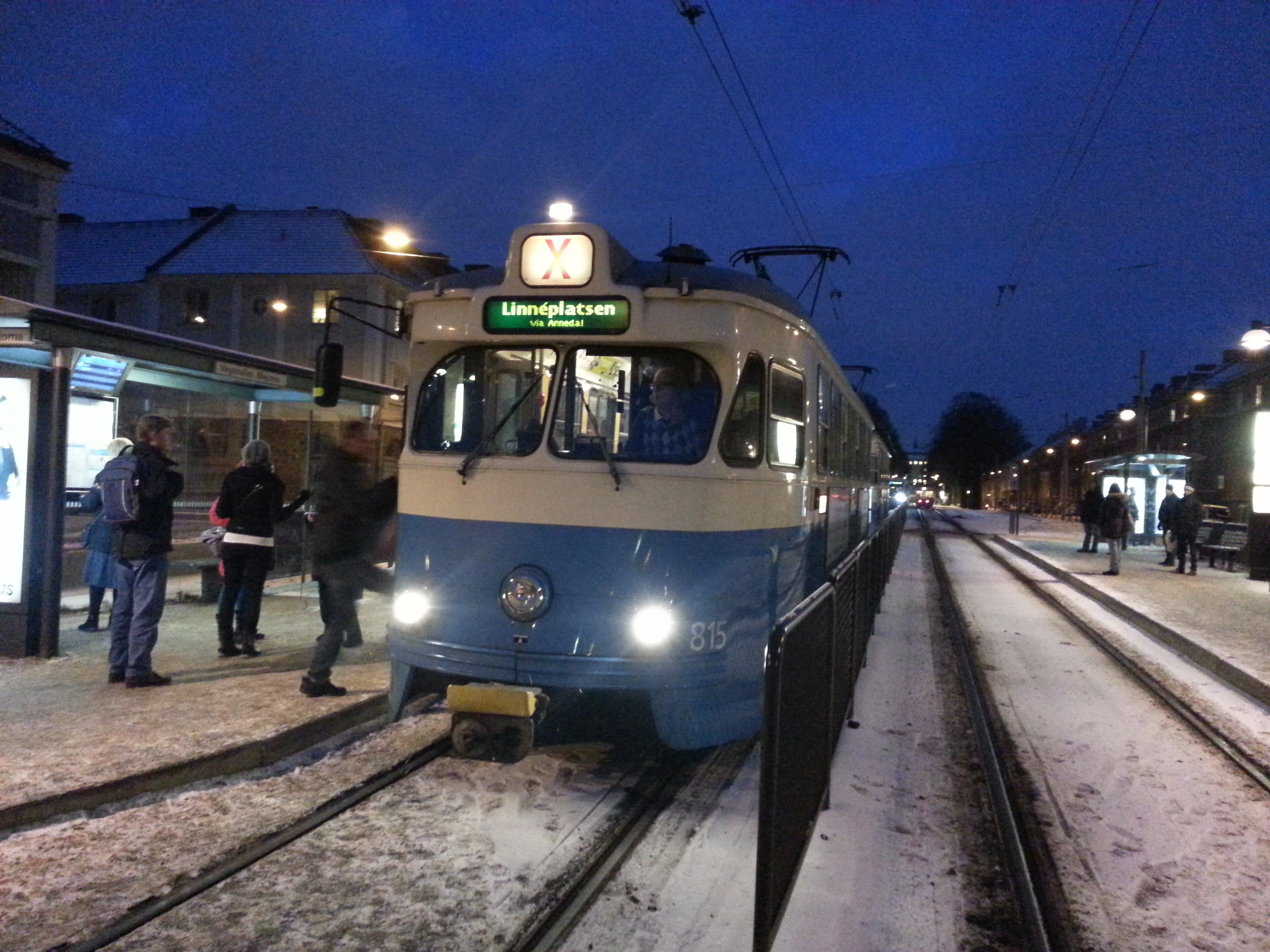
- Tram stop at night with an M29 tram bound for Linneplatsen on line X

General information
- System: Gothenburg tram network station
- Platforms: 2
- Tracks: 2

Construction
- Structure type: Two platforms in the middle of Alvsborgsgatan (like Ostindiegatan)
Location

Vagnhallen Majorna is a Gothenburg tram network stop. It has two platforms with trees that separate the tram tracks from the road. It is one of the only two stations to have this structure; the other one is Ostindiegatan. Vagnhallen Majorna is an important tram stop because it is near the Vagnhallen Majorna where the tram stop depot is. There are many trams that use the tram stop.

Kålltorp		Marklandsgatan
Jaegerdorffsplatsen	Vagnhallen Majorna	Ostindiegatan
Angered		Kungssten
Jaegerdorffsplatsen	Vagnhallen Majorna	Ostindiegatan
