= Kaptensgatan tram stop =

Tram station in Gothenburg, Sweden

Kaptensgatan

General information
- Location: Karl Johansgatan; Sweden
- System: Gothenburg tram network stop
- Platforms: 2, southbound after intersection and northbound before intersection with Kaptensgatan
- Tracks: 2

Construction
- Parking: No
Location

Kaptensgatan is a tram stop of the Gothenburg tram network, on Karl Johansgatan between Stigberget and Majorna, on lines 3 and 9. Like in the middle in UK there is a level crossing, where most minor UK stations, it features Kaptensgatan. The southbound platform is after the intersection with Kaptensgatan, while the northbound is before. It's the last station (if travelling towards the city centre) before it joins with line 11 at Stigbergstorget.

Kålltorp		Marklandsgatan
Stigbergstorget	Kaptensgatan	Chapmans Torg
Angered		Kungssten
Stigbergstorget	Kaptensgatan	Chapmans Torg
