= Jaegerdorffsplatsen tram stop =

Tram station in Gothenburg, Sweden

Jaegerdorffsplatsen

General information
- System: Gothenburg tram network stop
- Platforms: 2
- Tracks: 2

Construction
- Structure type: 2 platform in a middle of the grass
Location

Jaegerdorffsplatsen is a tram stop of the Gothenburg tram network located in Majorna, and is the last tram stop on Karl Johansgatan. After Jaegerdorffsplatsen in order to rejoin with line 11, it turns on Älvsborgsgatan.

Kålltorp		Marklandsgatan
Chapmans Torg	Jaegerdorffsplatsen	Vagnhallen Majorna
Angered		Kungssten
Chapmans Torg	Jaegerdorffsplatsen	Vagnhallen Majorna
