= Masthuggstorget tram stop =

Tram station in Gothenburg, Sweden

Masthuggstorget
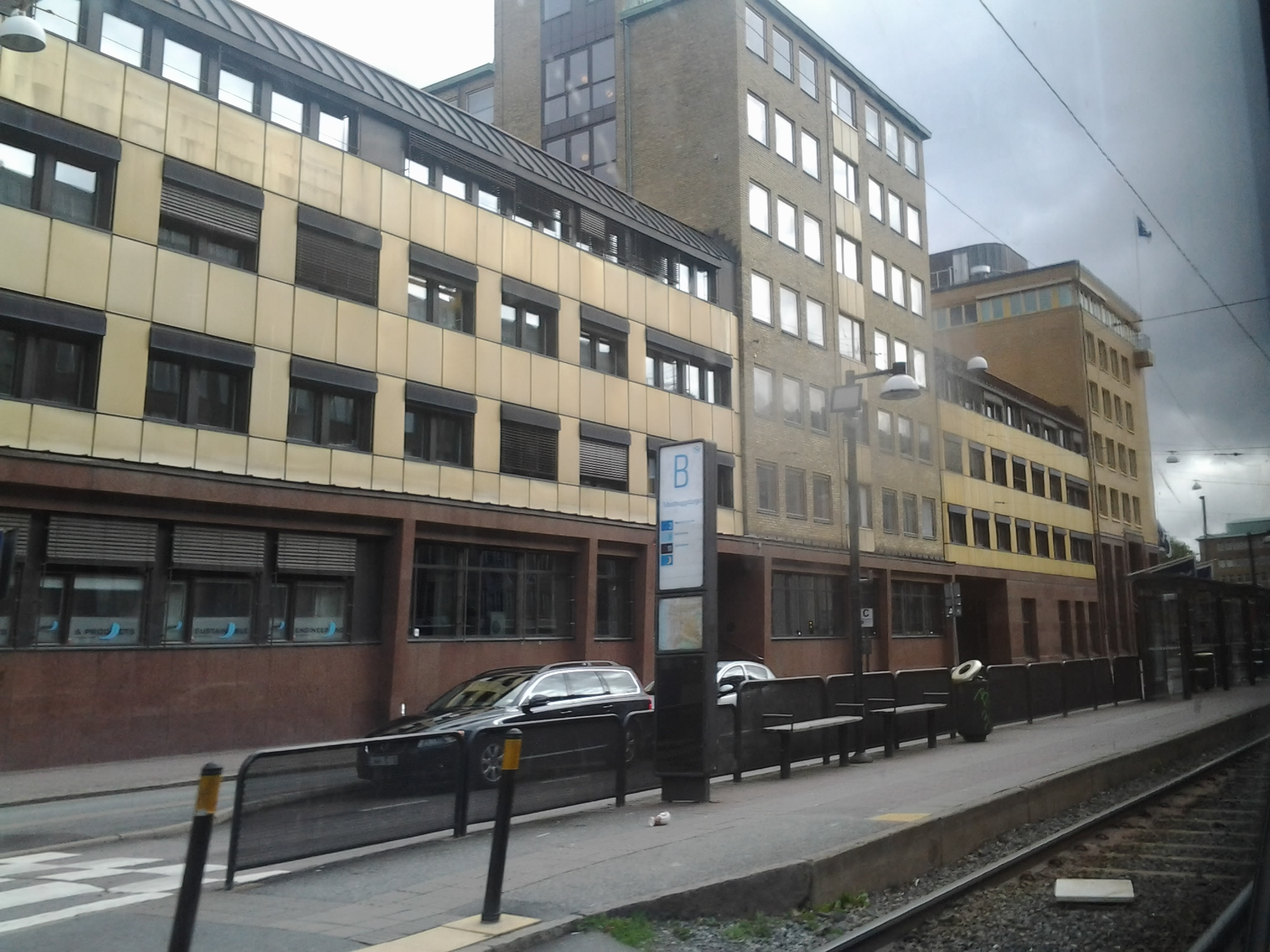
- The tram stop viewed from a tram

General information
- System: Gothenburg tram network stop

Construction
- Structure type: Street level on grassway
Location

Masthuggstorget is a tram stop of the Gothenburg tram network, located on Första Långgatan. Masthuggstorget features a lawn track segment where the rails are embedded within a grassy median rather than traditional asphalt or concrete. It's the last before it joins routes 1 and 6, at Järntorget. At the next stop, Hagakyrkan, because line 3 is part of the lines that go to Brunnsparken via Valand and Kungsportsplatsen, there is junction. At Grönsakstorget, line 2 joins and forms lines that go to Brunnsparken via Domkyrkan.

Kålltorp		Marklandsgatan
Järntorget	Masthuggstorget	Stigbergstorget
Angered		Kungssten
Järntorget	Masthuggstorget	Stigbergstorget
Bergsjön		Saltholmen
Järntorget	Masthuggstorget	Stigbergstorget
