= Chapmans Torg tram stop =

Tram stop of the Gothenburg tram network

Chapmans Torg
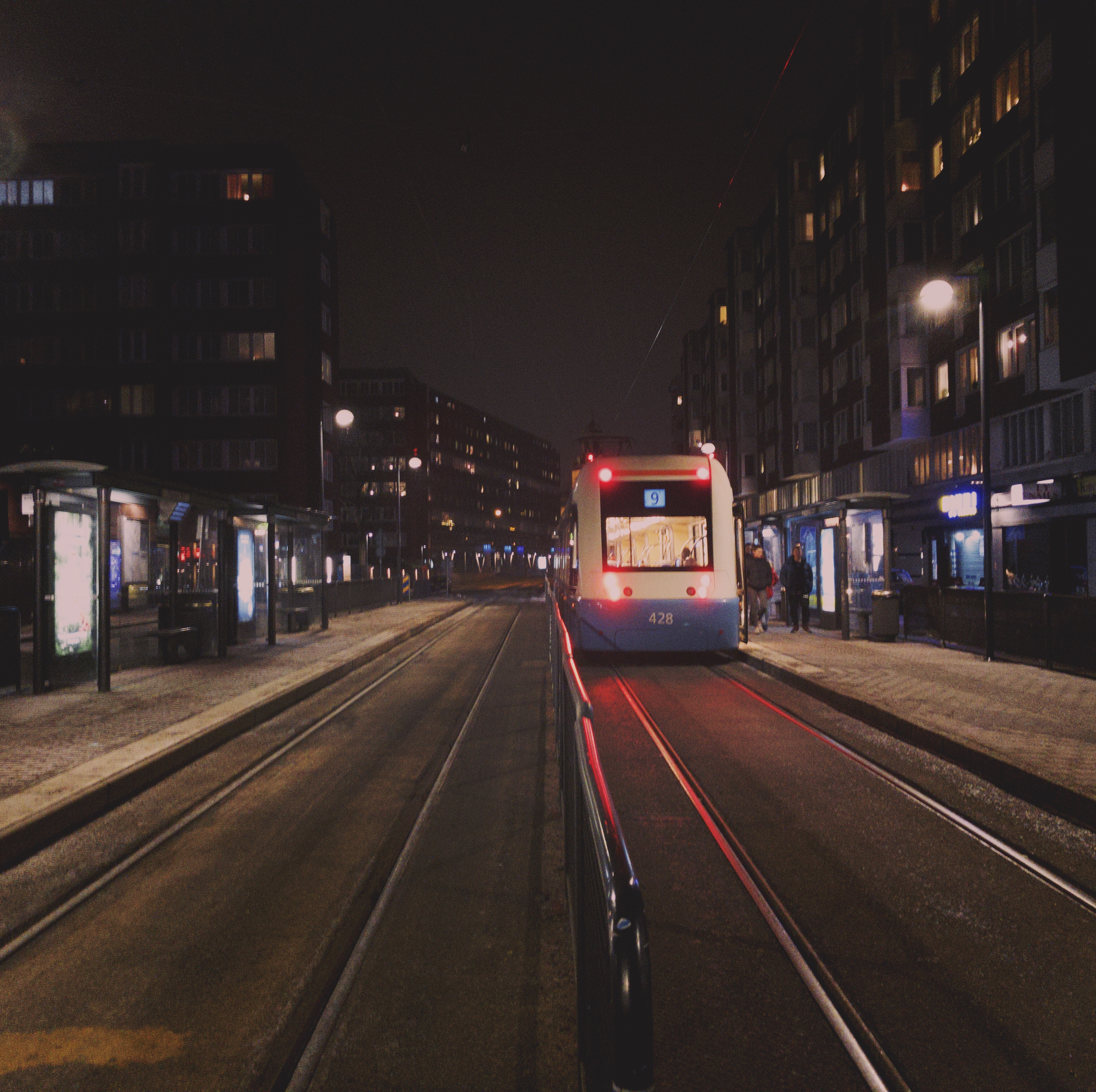
- Chapmans Torg tram stop, February 2018

General information
- Coordinates: 57°41′39.23″N 11°55′9.62″E
- System: Gothenburg tram network stop
- Operator: Västtrafik
- Platforms: 2
- Tracks: 2

Construction
- Parking: No
Location

Chapmans Torg is a tram stop of the Gothenburg tram network, located not far from the Spar Hotel Majorna and the Majorna bibilothek.

| Kålltorp | | Marklandsgatan |
| Kaptensgatan | Chapmans Torg | Jaegerdorffsplatsen |
| Angered | | Kungssten |
| Kaptensgatan | Chapmans Torg | Jaegerdorffsplatsen |
