= Järntorget tram stop =

Tram station in Gothenburg, Sweden

Järntorget
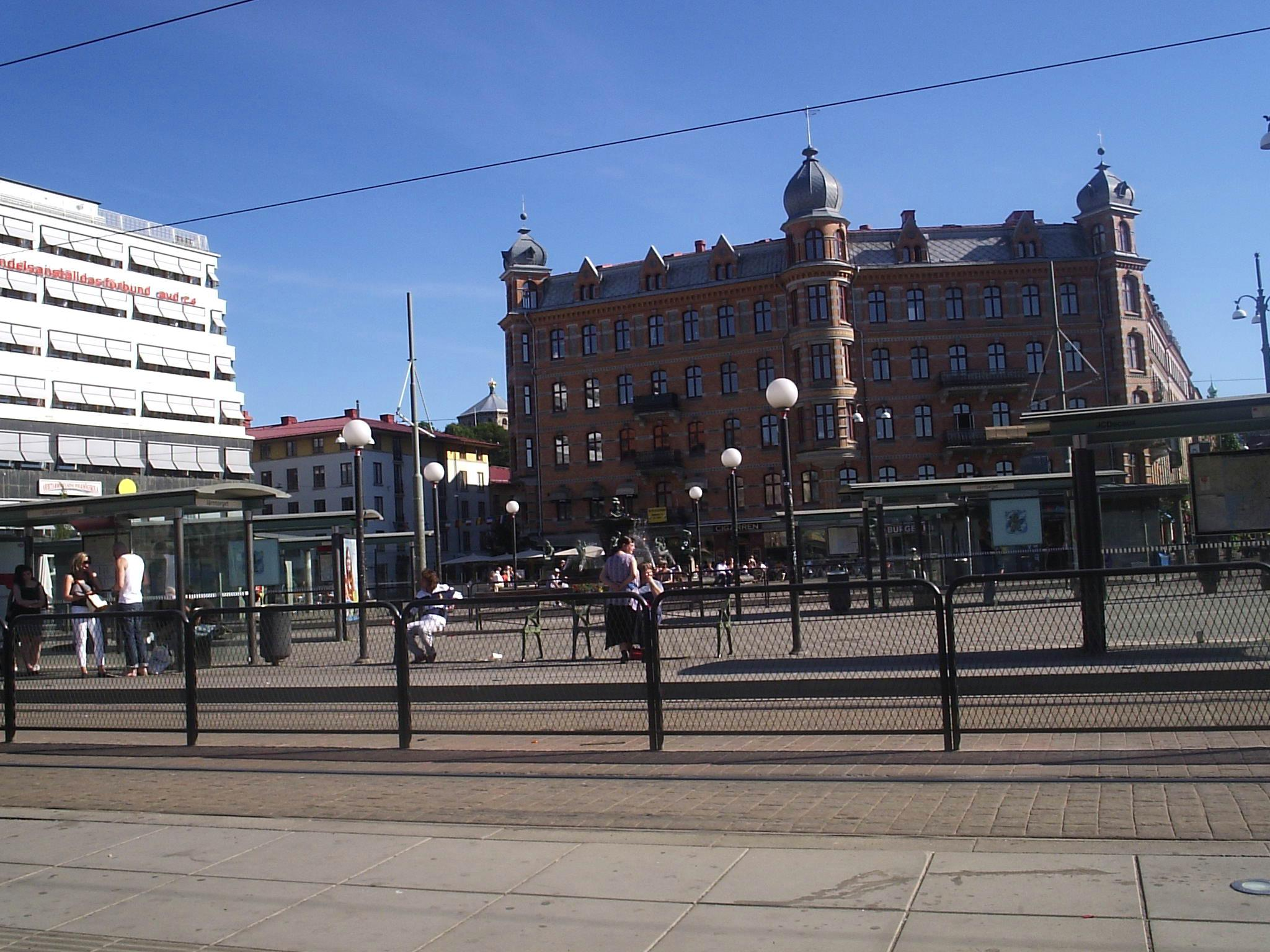
- L3-L9-L11 platform

General information
- System: Gothenburg tram network stop
- Platforms: 4
- Tracks: 4

Construction
- Structure type: 4 platforms, 2 for via Linnéplatsen, 2 for via Stigbergstorget
Location

Järntorget is a tram stop located in the square of Järntorget in Gothenburg, Sweden. It has 4 platforms, the left one is served by lines 1 and 6. The line 2 cuts Järntorget via Handelshögskolan. The left one is for trams going via Linnéplatsen. The right one is for going via Stigbergstorget and is served by lines 3, 9 and 11. It is an important interchange, even if it is not served by line 2.

Östra Sjukhuset		Tynnered
Hagakyrkan	Järntorget	Prinsgatan
Kålltorp		Marklandsgatan
Hagakyrkan	Järntorget	Masthuggstorget
Länsmansgården		Kortedela
Hagakyrkan	Järntorget	Prinsgatan
Angered		Kungssten
Hagakyrkan	Järntorget	Masthuggstorget
Bergsjön		Saltholmen
Hagakyrkan	Järntorget	Masthuggstorget
