= Göteborgs Rapé =

Svenskt snusmärke

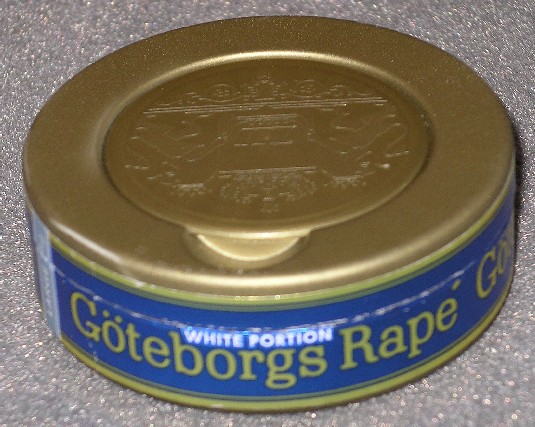
Göteborgs Rapé can

Göteborgs Rapé (Swedish pronunciation: [jœtɛˈbɔrjs raˈpeː]; transl. "Gothenburg's grated/shredded") is a popular brand of Swedish snus – a pasteurized smokeless tobacco product. Its original recipe was created in Gothenburg during the early 19th century.

== History ==
Its origins are atypical for Swedish snus brands, as the recipe evolved through trial and error among sailors on merchant ships mooring in the port of Gothenburg. Unable to afford high-quality ingredients, these seamen added different spices to their loose smokeless tobacco, thereby creating their personal snus blends. A few of these blends were sold locally under 'brand names'. Göteborgs Rapé was made from selected hand-ripped tobacco giving the snus "... a mild and sweet tobacco flavor with tones of juniper berry and fresh herbs". Although popular, it was initially rarely sold outside the Gothenburg region.

In order to create funding for the country's defence, and one of the first pension reforms, the state monopolized the entire Swedish tobacco industry in 1915. After the take-over, the state monopoly, controlled 103 brands of snus, of which no less than 25 were from Gothenburg. In order to slim the portfolio, the recipes were put in front of a jury. A tasting was conducted and in 1919 only five remained. These became registered brands, one of which was the Göteborgs Rapé. Since 1919 Göteborgs Rapé has been a factory-produced snus with no hand-ripping taking place.

== Product milestones ==
- 1915 – the brand is registered by the Swedish state tobacco monopoly.
- 1967 – Swedish Match introduces the classic round can.
- 1997 – Göteborgs Rapé introduces white portion snus, making the pouches white with a dry surface and therefore less runny.
- 2005 – White Mini Portions are introduced.
- 2006 – Göteborgs Rapé no. 2 Lingon is launched, flavoured with lingonberries.

As of 2010 the Göteborgs Rapé had a 14% market share of the Swedish snus market.
