= Lindholmsdockan =

Lindholmsdockan is a dry dock and is located in Gothenburg, Sweden. It opened in 1875 and is being used as a small marina.
