= Masthugg Church =

Church in Gothenburg, Sweden

- Masthuggskyrkan
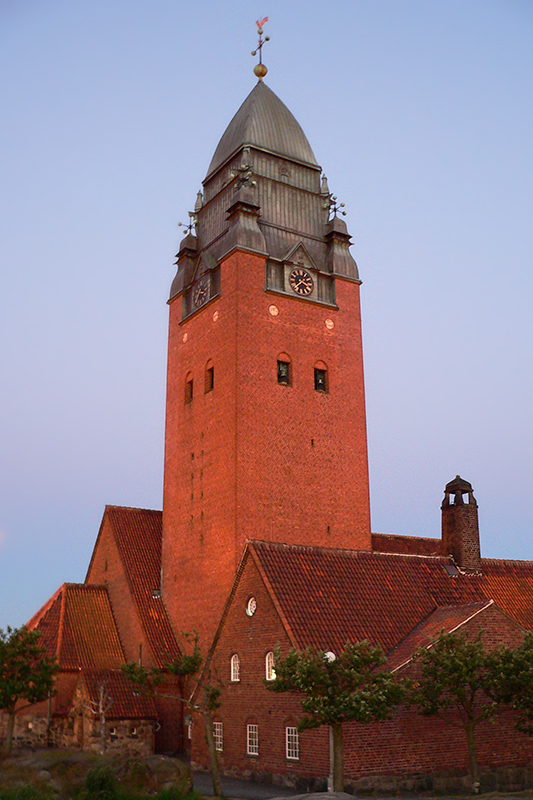
- Masthugg Church, external view
- Masthugg Church
- 57°41′50″N 11°56′15″E
- Country: Sweden
- Denomination: Church of Sweden

Architecture
- Architect: Sigfrid Ericson
- Style: Romantic nationalism
- Completed: 1914; 112 years ago

Specifications
- Height: 60 m (200 ft)

Administration
- Diocese: Gothenburg

Masthugg Church (Swedish: Masthuggskyrkan) in Gothenburg, Sweden, was built in 1914. Its position on a high hill (Masthugget) close to the city and near the Göta älv makes it a striking sight – the church tower is 60 m (200 ft) high in itself. The church represents the National Romantic style in Nordic architecture and was designed by Sigfrid Ericson. The church, which has become one of the symbols of Gothenburg, is a popular tourist attraction.
