= Färjenäsparken =

Park in Gothenburg, Sweden

Coordinates: 57.697°N 11.903°E

Färjenäsparken is a park located on the north bank of the Göta älv, Sweden. It consists of grilling places, a driving range, a ground for beach volleyball, mini golf, a cafe with a lunch restaurant, and other attractions. Färjenäs is where Karl IX founded Gothenburg in 1603. In 1611 the city was burned down by the Danes.
