= Kal and Ada =

Fictional couple from Gothenburg, Sweden

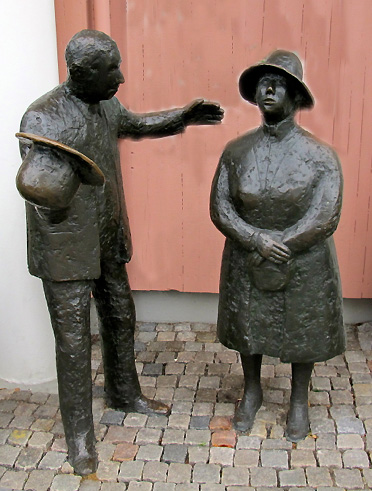
The sculpture group Kal and Ada by Svenrobert Lundquist in bronze, unveiled 1995 at the main entrance to Liseberg.

Kal and Ada are an archetypal, fictional working-class couple from Gothenburg. They have become synonymous with "people from Gothenburg" and are featured in "Gothenburg jokes" (göteborgsvitsar), songs, plays and names of events.

The urbanization and industrialization of Sweden starting in the late 1800s led to a new kind of city-based working class. Kal-and-Ada jokes frequently pit that class against wealthy people or authority figures. Kal, also known as Kâlle or Karl, and Ada are patriotic, party-loving, hard-drinking practical jokers who love to tease Stockholmers, Scanians and other outsiders, also fond of punning. They often feature in stories with their friends Osborn and his wife Beda.

In Gothenburg, each year two persons who have significantly contributed to culture in the city are given the honorary titles of "Kal and Ada". A bronze statue of the couple made by Svenrobert Lundquist, was placed outside the entrance to Liseberg in 1995.

== See also ==
- Bellman joke
- People from Gothenburg
