= Gadk =

Swedish scuba diving club

GADK, or Göteborgs amatördykarklubb in Swedish, is a Swedish scuba diving club founded in 1938. GADK is the oldest active diving club in the world.
