= Vasa Church, Gothenburg =

Church in Gothenburg, Sweden

Coordinates: 57°41′50″N 11°58′24″E

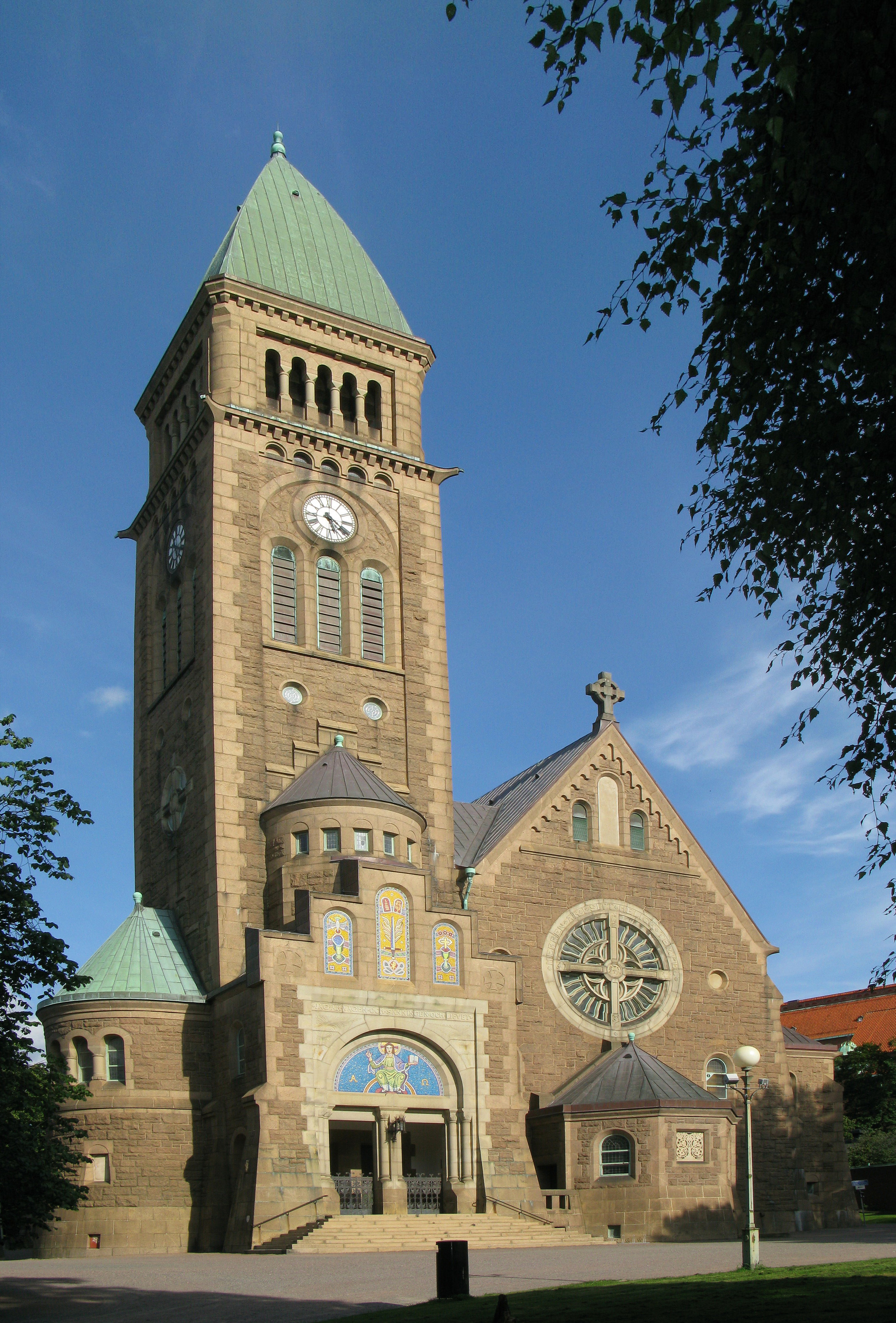
Vasa Church

The Vasa Church (Swedish: Vasakyrkan) is a church in Gothenburg, Sweden. It is located in the area of Vasastaden, between Hvitfeldtska gymnasiet and Vasaparken. It was founded in 1909 and is built in a Neo-Romanesque style, of granite that was brought from nearby Bohuslän. It underwent major renovations during 1999 and 2000.
