= Vasaparken =

Vasaparken may refer to:

- Vasaparken, Gothenburg, a park in Gothenburg, Sweden
- Vasaparken, Stockholm, a park in Stockholm, Sweden
