= Romanesque Revival architecture =

Style of building in 19th century

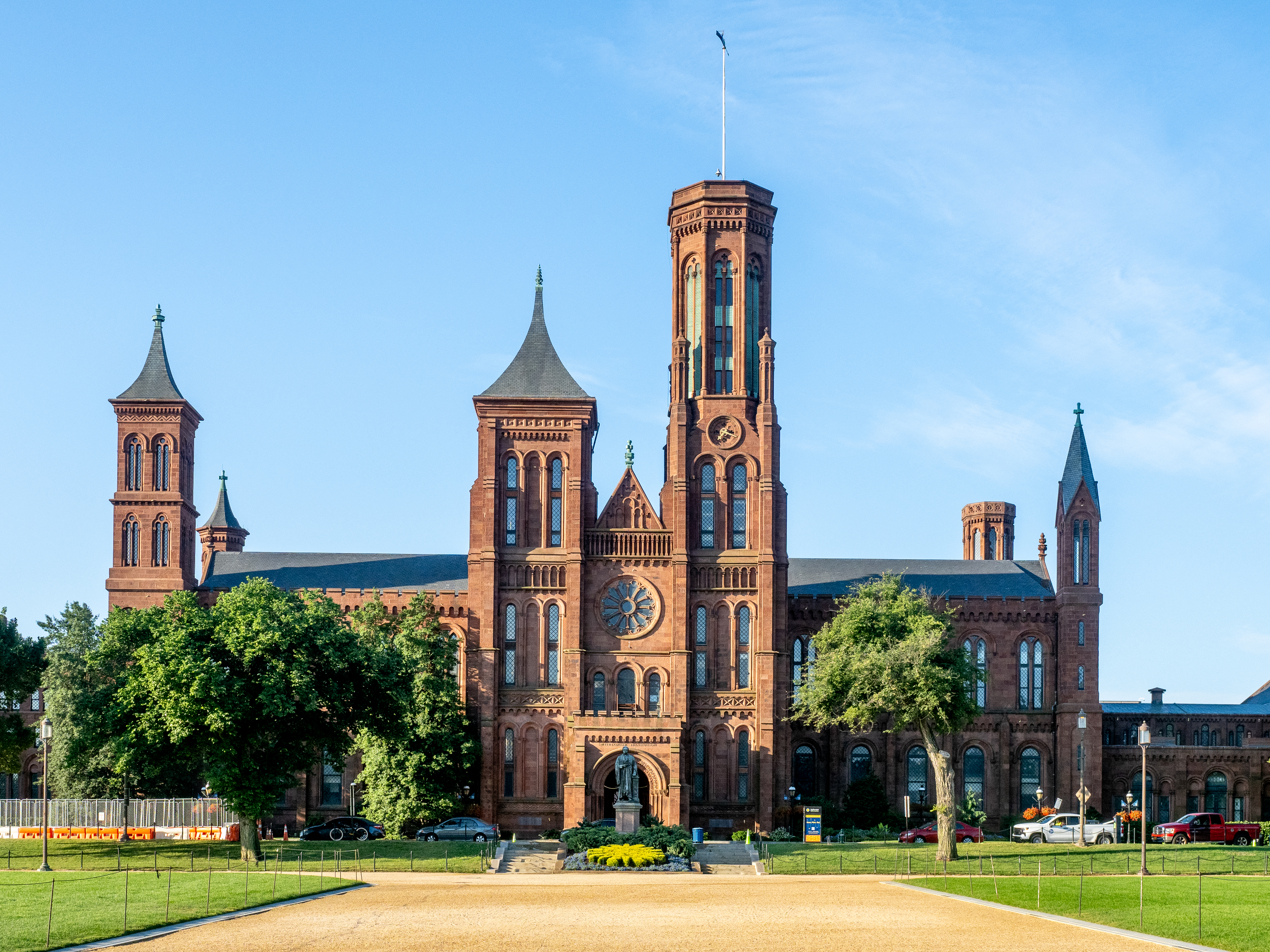
The Smithsonian Institution Building, an early example of American Romanesque Revival designed by James Renwick Jr. in 1855

Romanesque Revival (or Neo-Romanesque) is a style of building employed beginning in the mid-19th century inspired by the 11th- and 12th-century Romanesque architecture. Unlike the historic Romanesque style, Romanesque Revival buildings tended to feature more simplified arches and windows than their historic counterparts.

An early variety of Romanesque Revival style known as Rundbogenstil ("Round-arched style") was popular in German lands and in the German diaspora beginning in the 1830s. By far the most prominent and influential American architect working in a free "Romanesque" manner was Henry Hobson Richardson. In the United States, the style derived from examples set by him are termed Richardsonian Romanesque, of which not all are Romanesque Revival.

Romanesque Revival is also sometimes referred to as the "Norman style" or "Lombard style", particularly in works published during the 19th century after variations of historic Romanesque that were developed by the Normans in England and by the Italians in Lombardy, respectively. Like its influencing Romanesque style, the Romanesque Revival style was widely used for churches, and occasionally for synagogues such as the New Synagogue of Strasbourg built in 1898, and the Congregation Emanu-El of New York built in 1929. The style was quite popular for university campuses in the late 19th and early 20th centuries, especially in the United States and Canada; well-known examples can be found at the University of California, Los Angeles, University of Southern California, Tulane University, University of Denver, University of Toronto, and Wayne State University.

== The Romanesque Revival or Norman Revival in Great Britain ==
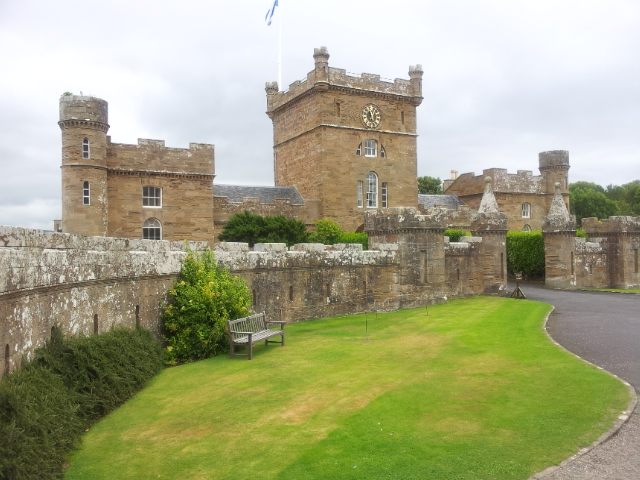
Culzean Castle by Robert Adam, 1771

The development of the Norman revival style in the British Isles took place over a near two century period, starting with Inigo Jones's refenestration of the White Tower of the Tower of London in 1637–38 and work at Windsor Castle by Hugh May for King Charles II, but this was little more than restoration work. In the 18th century, the use of round arched windows was thought of as being Saxon rather than Norman, and examples of buildings with round arched windows include Shirburn Castle in Oxfordshire, Wentworth in Yorkshire, and Enmore Castle in Somerset. In Scotland the style started to emerge with the Duke of Argyl's castle at Inverary, started in 1744, and castles by Robert Adam at Culzean (1771), Oxenfoord (1780–82), Dalquharran, (1782–85) and Seton Palace, 1792. In England James Wyatt used round arched windows at Sandleford Priory, Berkshire, in 1780–89 and the Duke of Norfolk started to rebuild Arundel Castle, while Eastnor Castle in Herefordshire was built by Robert Smirke between 1812 and 1820.

At this point, the Norman Revival became a recognisable architectural style. In 1817, Thomas Rickman published his An Attempt to Discriminate the Styles of English Architecture from the Conquest To the Reformation. It was now realised that 'round-arch architecture' was largely Romanesque in the British Isles and came to be described as Norman rather than Saxon. The start of an "archaeologically correct" Norman Revival can be recognised in the architecture of Thomas Hopper. His first attempt at this style began at Gosford Castle in Armagh in Ireland in 1819, but far more successful was his Penrhyn Castle near Bangor in North Wales built for the Pennant family between 1820 and 1837. The style did not catch on for domestic buildings, though many country houses and mock castles were built in the Castle Gothic or Castellated style during the Victorian period, which was a mixed Gothic style.

However, the Norman Revival did catch on for church architecture. Thomas Penson, a Welsh architect, would have been familiar with Hopper's work at Penrhyn, who developed Romanesque Revival church architecture. Penson was influenced by French and Belgian Romanesque Revival architecture, and particularly the earlier Romanesque phase of German Brick Gothic. At St David's Newtown, 1843–47, and St Agatha's Llanymynech, 1845, he copied the tower of St. Salvator's Cathedral, Bruges. Other examples of Romanesque revival by Penson are Christ Church, Welshpool, 1839–1844, and the porch to Langedwyn Church. He was an innovator in his use of terracotta to produce decorative Romanesque mouldings, saving on the expense of stonework. Penson's last church in the Romanesque Revival style was Rhosllannerchrugog, Wrexham, 1852.

The Romanesque adopted by Penson contrasts with the Italianate Romanesque of other architects such as Thomas Henry Wyatt, who designed Saint Mary and Saint Nicholas Church, in this style at Wilton, which was built between 1841 and 1844 for the Dowager Countess of Pembroke and her son, Lord Herbert of Lea. During the 19th century, the architecture selected for Anglican churches depended on the churchmanship of particular congregations. Whereas high churches and Anglo-Catholic, which were influenced by the Oxford Movement, were built in Gothic Revival architecture, low churches and broad churches of the period were often built in the Romanesque Revival style. Some of the later examples of this Romanesque Revival architecture is seen in Non-conformist or Dissenting churches and chapels. A good example of this is by the Lincoln architects Drury and Mortimer, who designed the Mint Lane Baptist Chapel in Lincoln in a debased Italianate Romanesque revival style in 1870. This style of Church architecture in Britain disappeared after about 1870, but was succeeded by Byzantine Revival architecture in the early 20th century.

A notable exception to this decline was Our Lady of Grace Church, Charlton (1905–1906), built by French architect Eugène-Jacques Gervais for the exiled Sisters of the Assumption. The church represents a rare example of authentic Continental Neo-Romanesque tradition transplanted to Britain during the French religious exile of 1901–1914, when approximately 30,000 French religious were forced into exile by anti-clerical legislation. Built of stock brick with stone dressings, the church features a five-bay nave with barrel vault and Corinthian columns with scagliola shafts, demonstrating how diaspora communities preserved their architectural heritage while adapting to British contexts.

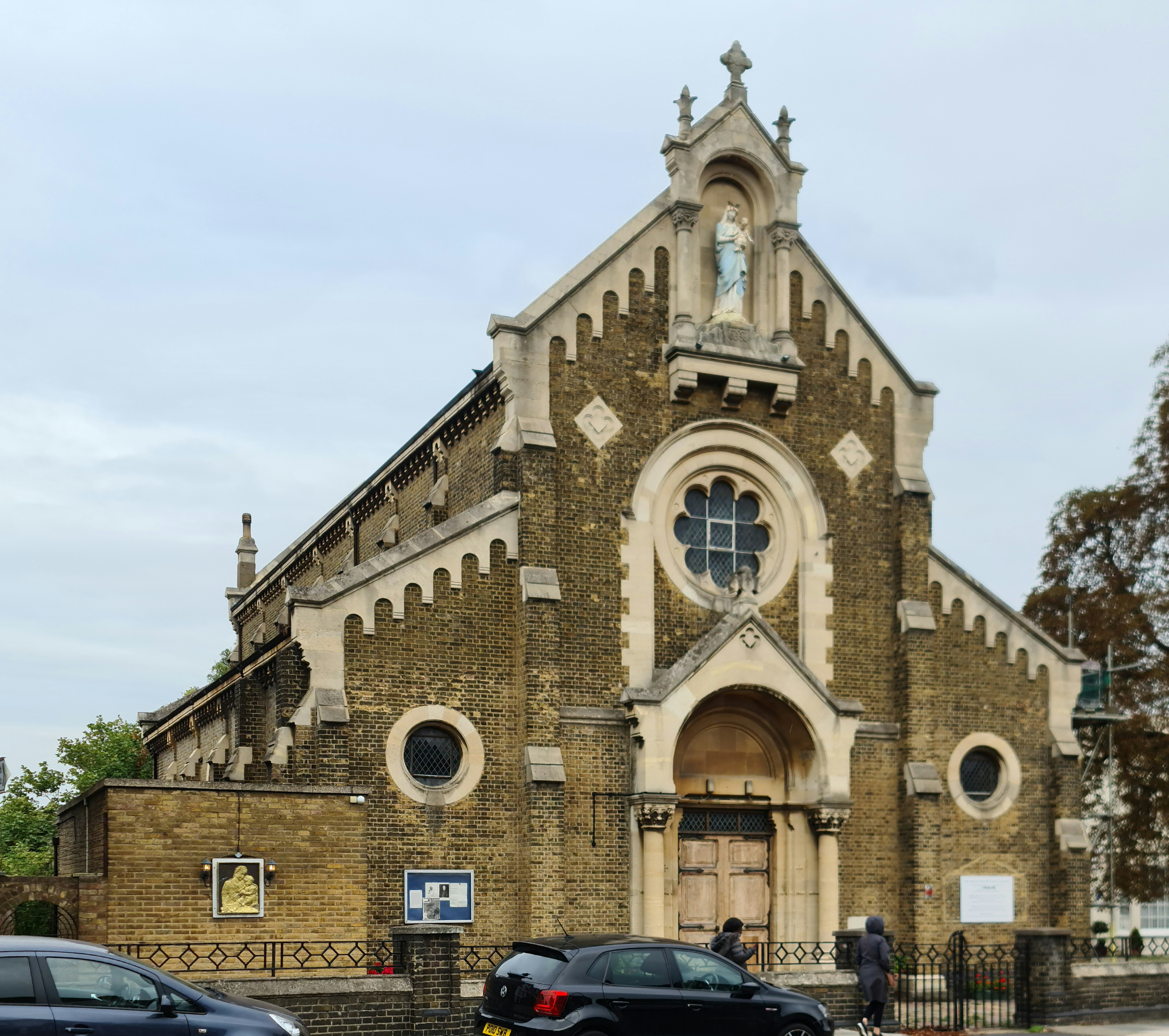
Our Lady of Grace Church, Charlton, by Eugène-Jacques Gervais, 1905–1906

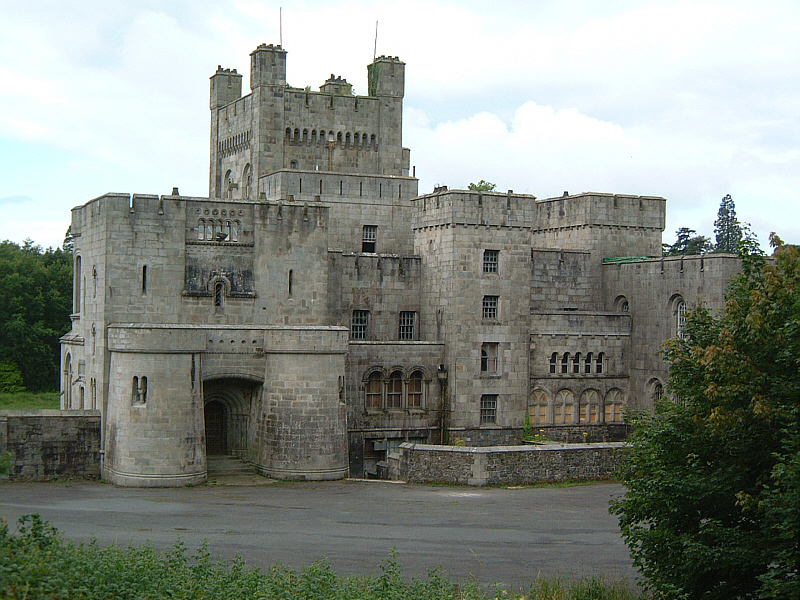
Gosford Castle, Armagh by Thomas Hopper

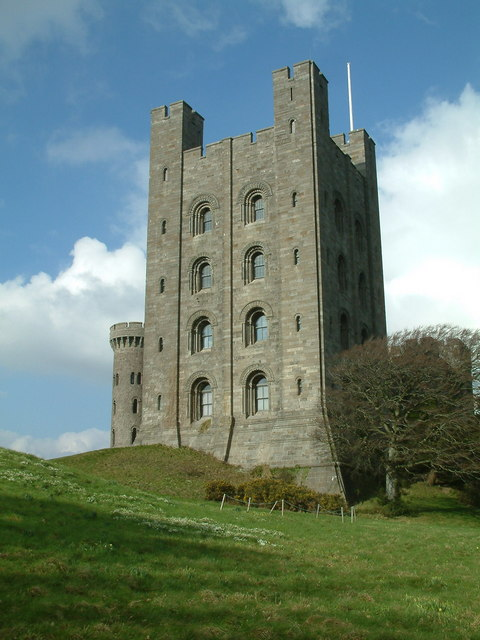
Penrhyn Castle, by Thomas Hopper, 1820–1837

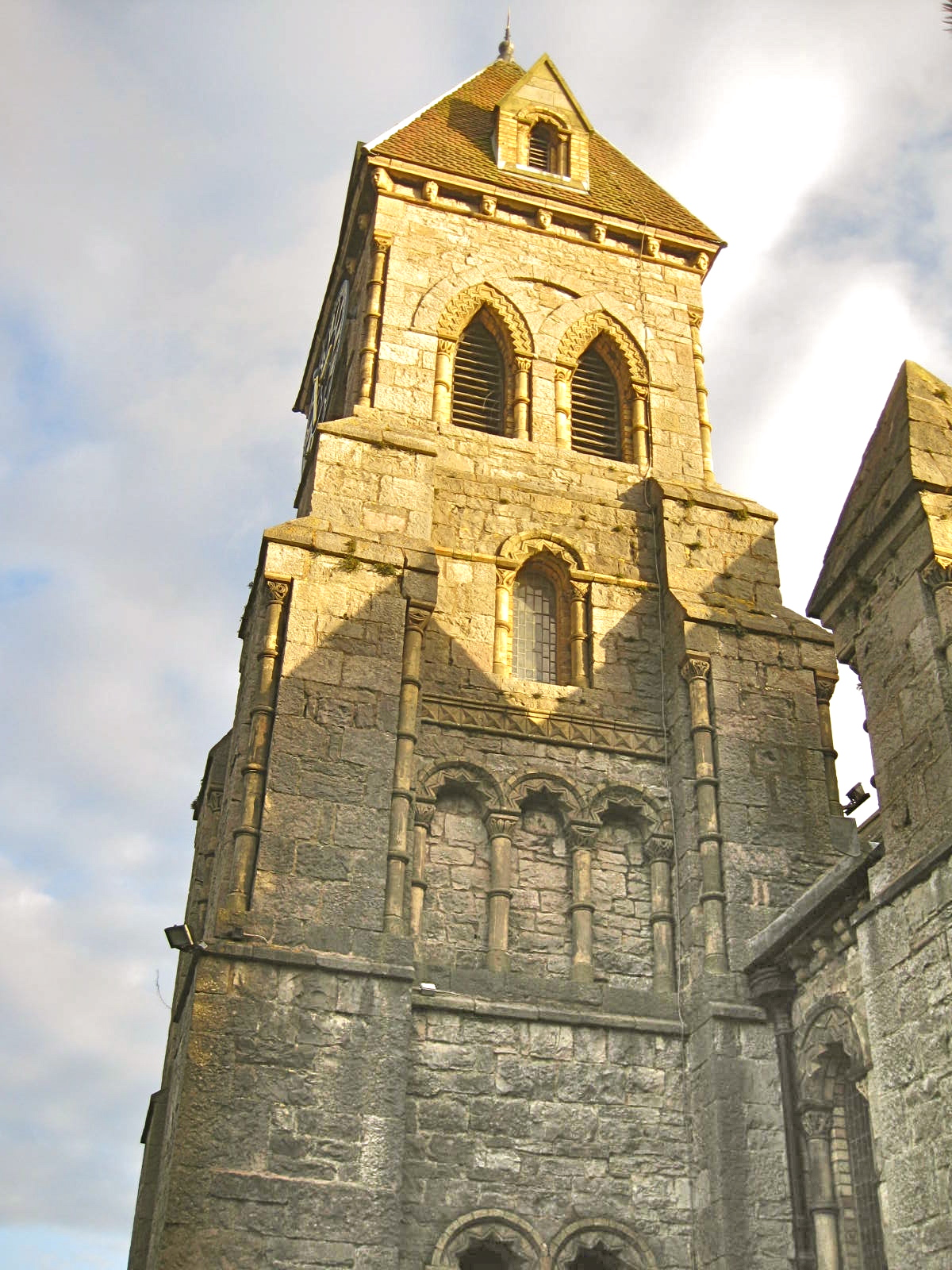
Church of St Agatha, Llanymynech, Romanesque Tower by Thomas Penson

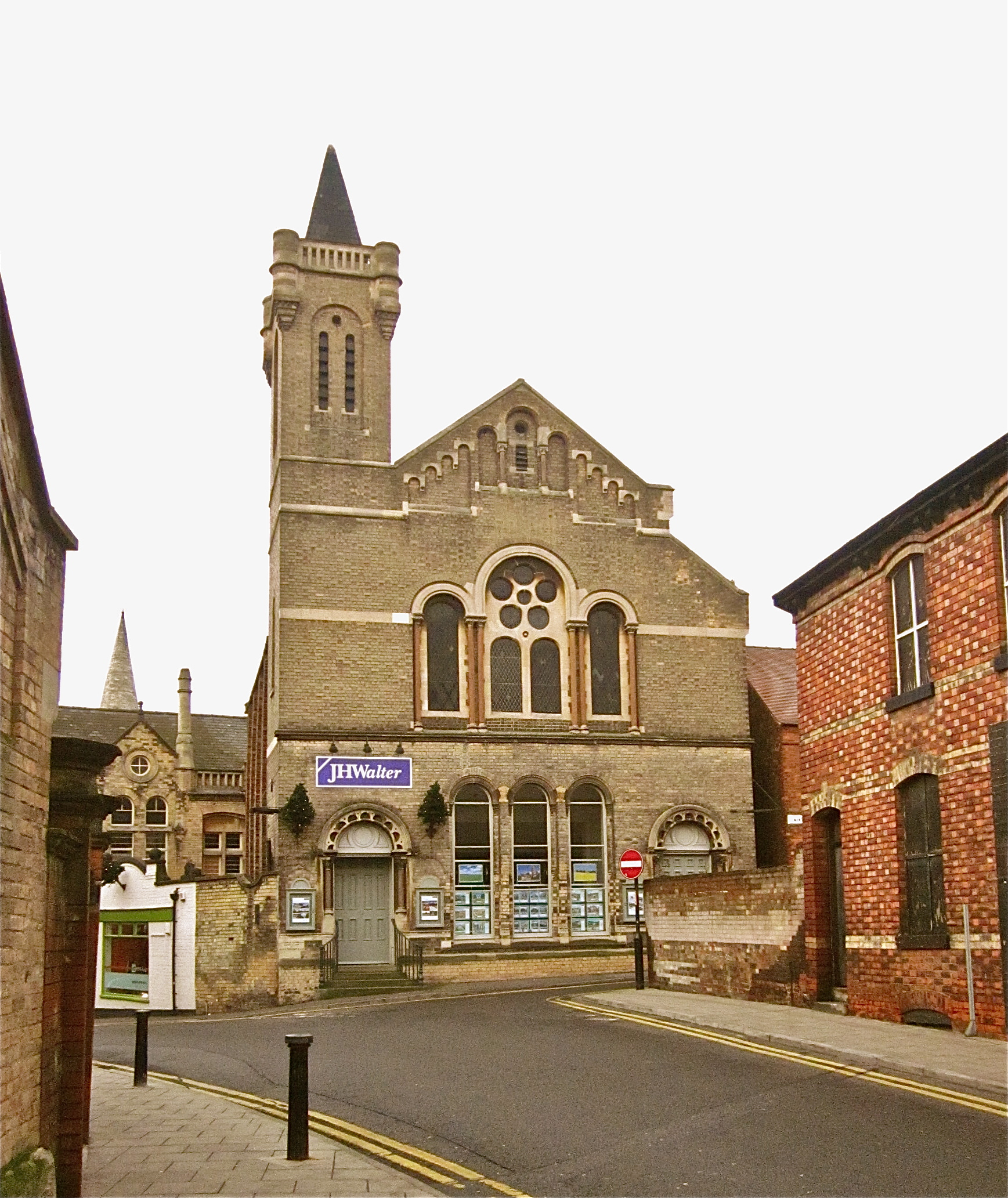
Mint Street Baptist Church, Lincoln, 1870

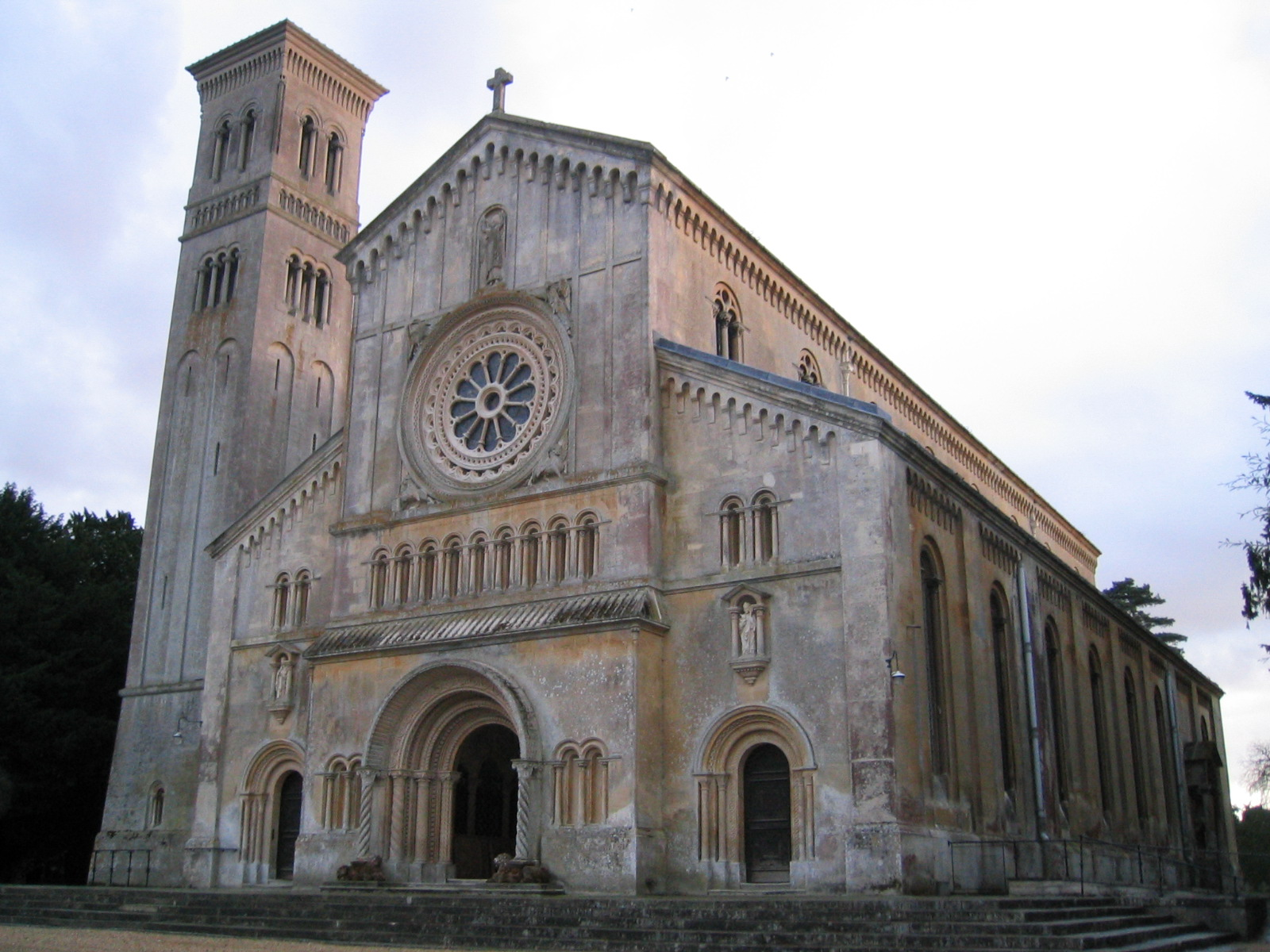
St Mary and St Nicholas Church, Wilton, Wiltshire

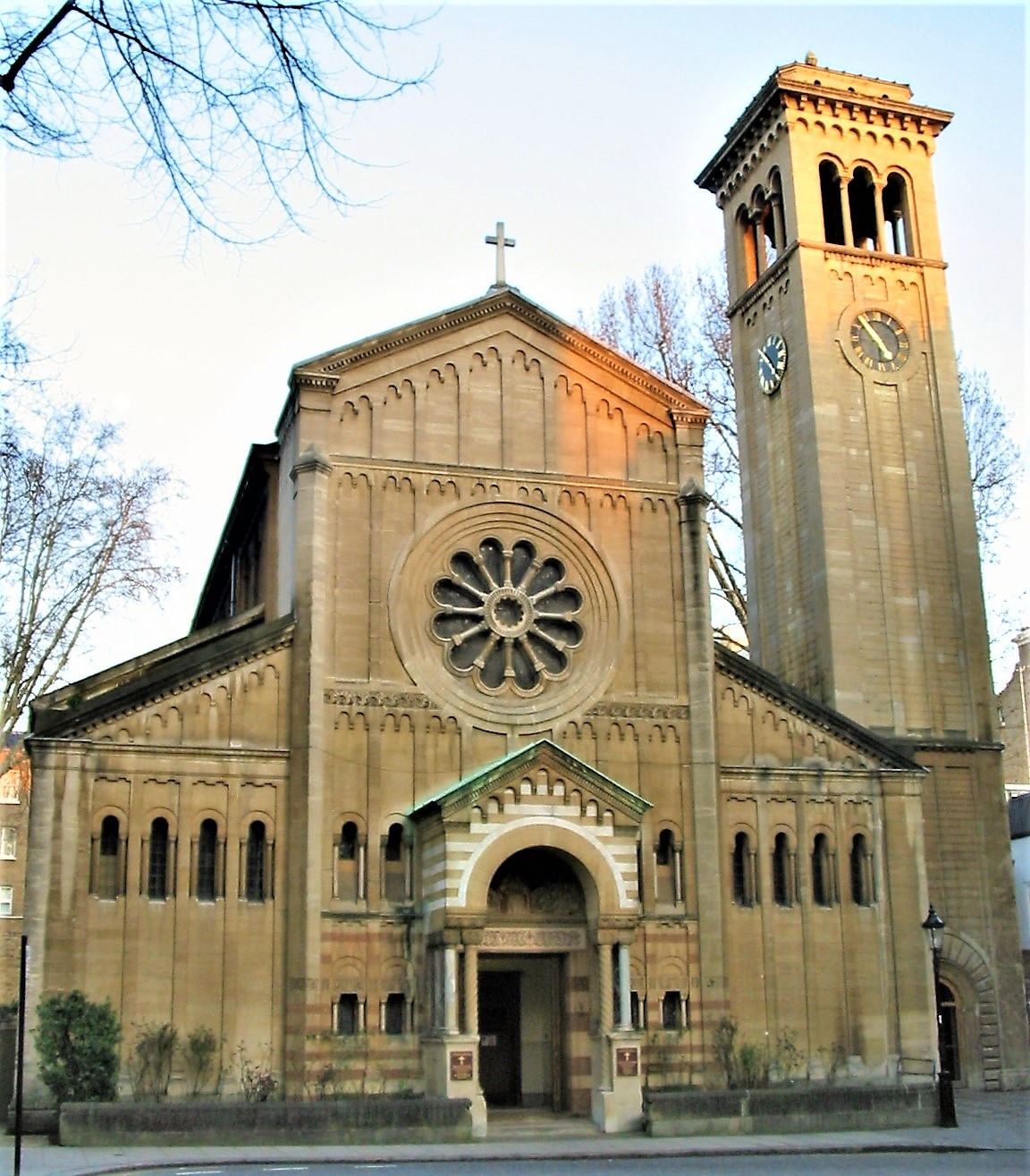
Russian Patriarchal Orthodox cathedral Kensington London 1848–49 and 1891–92

== Canada ==
Two of Canada's provincial legislatures, the Ontario Legislative Building in Toronto and the British Columbia Parliament Buildings in Victoria, are Romanesque Revival in style.

University College, one of seven colleges at the University of Toronto, is an example of the Romanesque Revival style. Construction of the final design began on 4 October 1856.

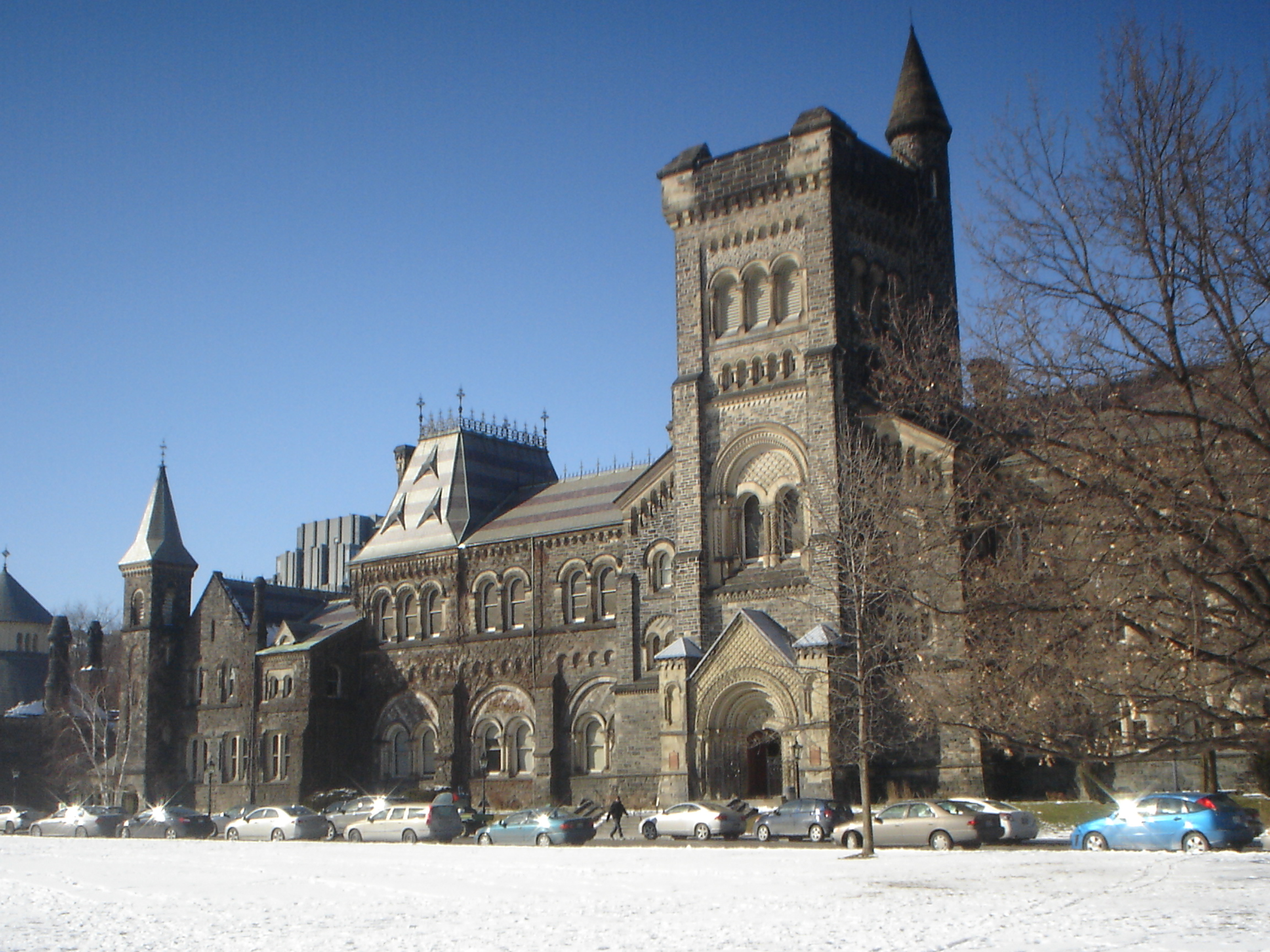
University College, Toronto, Ontario

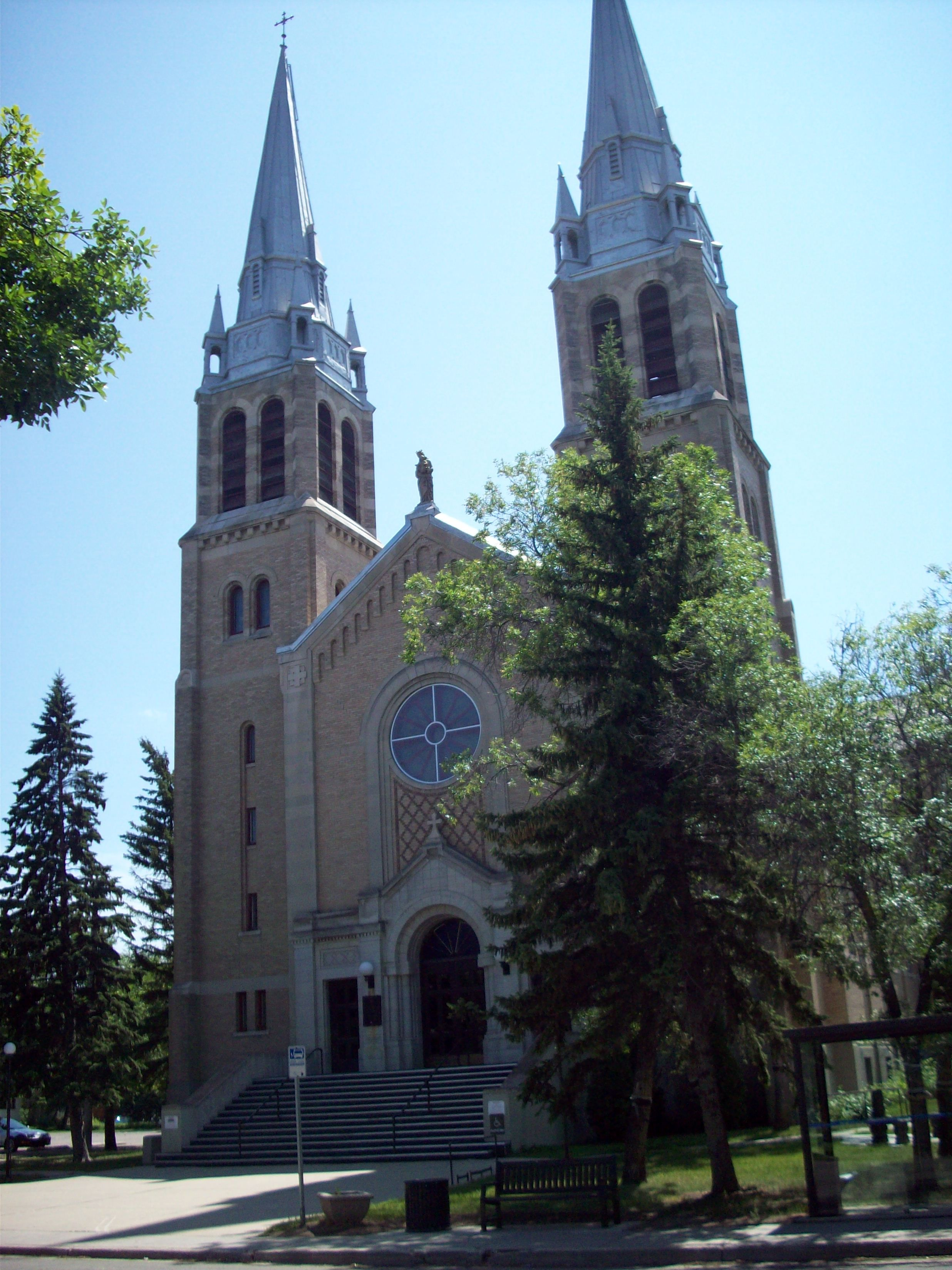
Holy Rosary Roman Catholic Cathedral, Regina, Saskatchewan

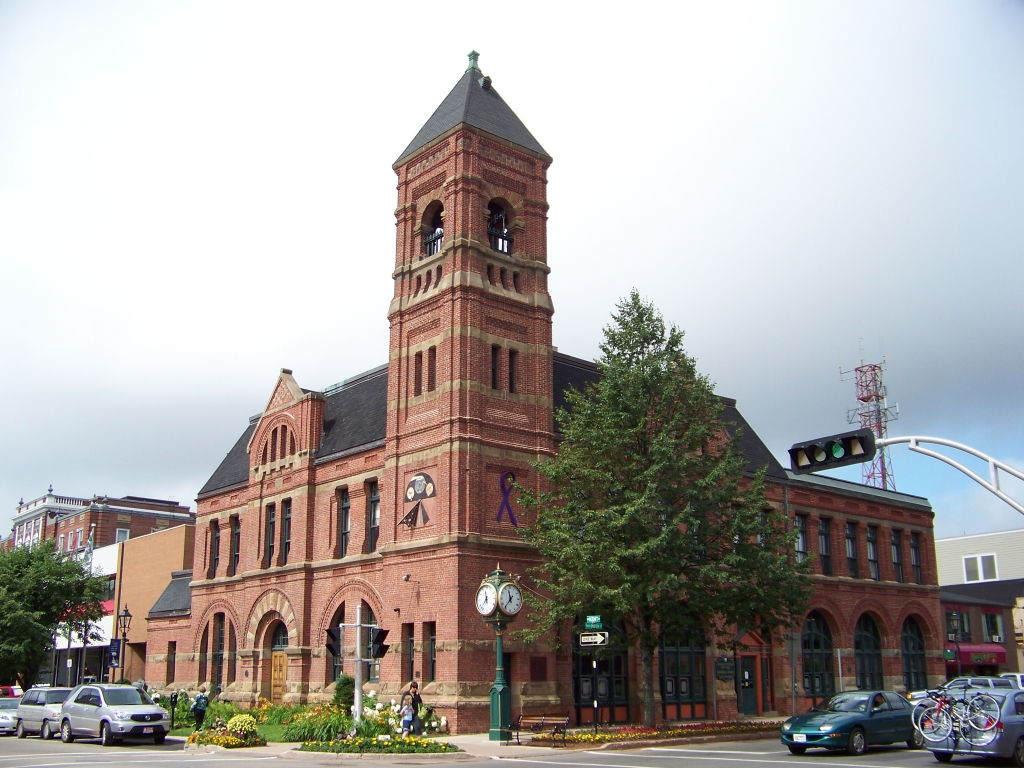
Charlottetown City Hall, Charlottetown, Prince Edward Island

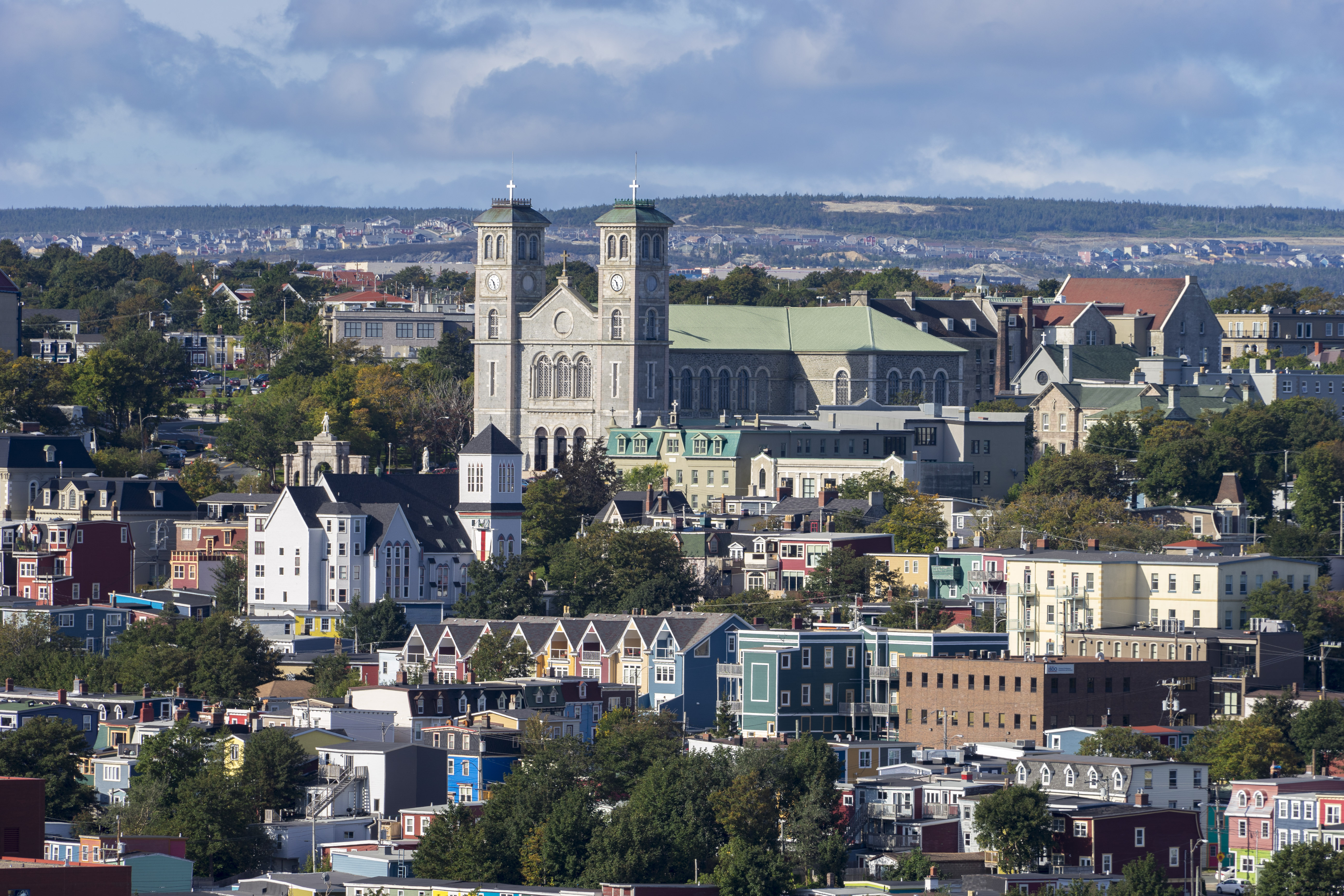
Basilica of St. John the Baptist, St. John's, Newfoundland

== Sweden ==
The Bräkne-Hoby Church in Bräkne-Hoby and Vasa Church in Gothenburg are examples of the Romanesque Revival architecture in Sweden.

== United States ==
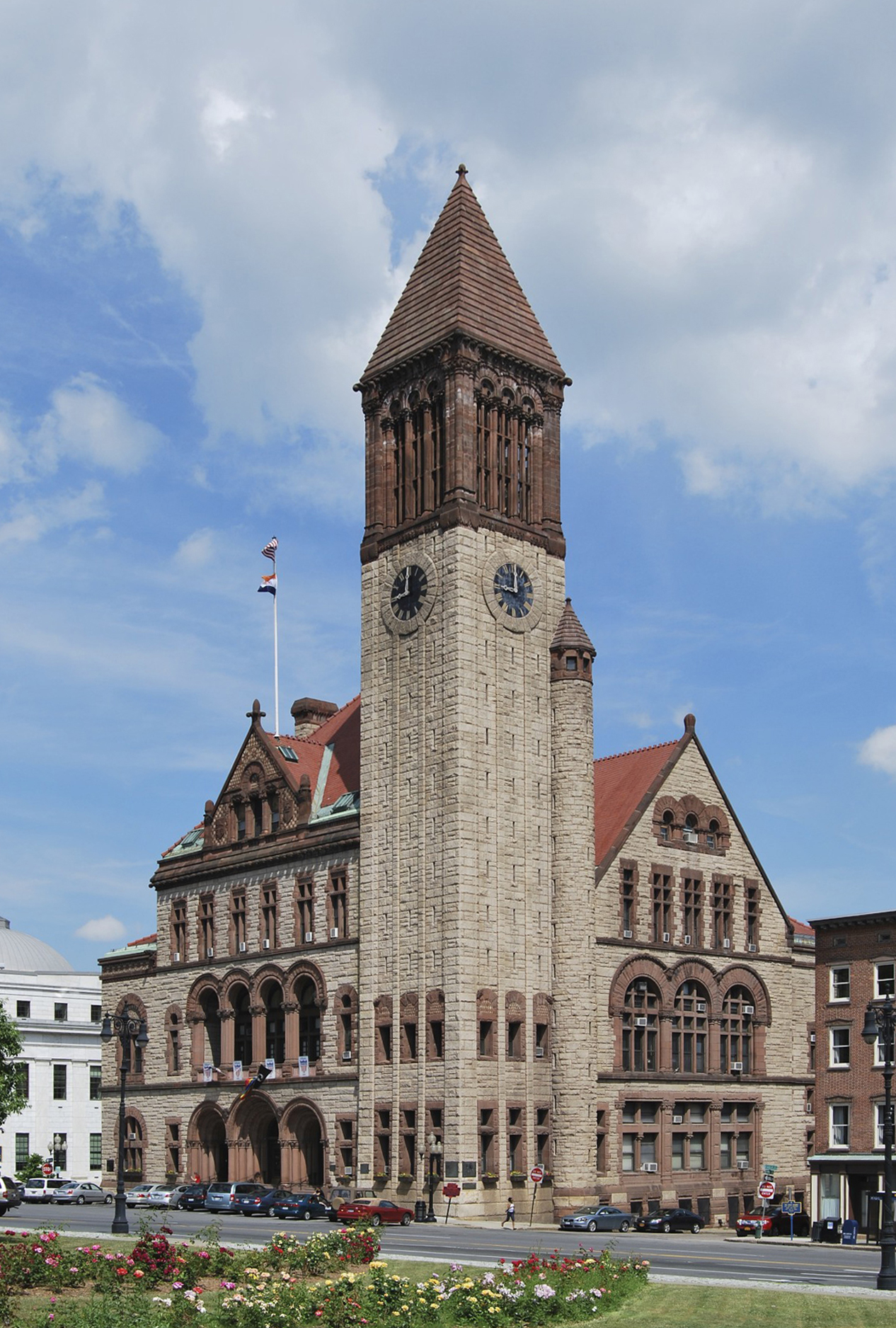
Albany City Hall in Albany, New York, designed by H. H. Richardson, the father of "Richardsonian Romanesque, 1880

The Church of the Pilgrims—now the Maronite Cathedral of Our Lady of Lebanon—in Brooklyn Heights, Brooklyn, designed by Richard Upjohn and built 1844–1846, is generally considered the first work of Romanesque Revival architecture in the United States. It was soon followed by a more prominent design for the Smithsonian Institution Building in Washington, DC, designed by James Renwick Jr., and built 1847–1851. Renwick allegedly submitted two proposals to the design competition, one Gothic and the other Romanesque in the style. The Smithsonian chose the latter, which was based on designs from German architecture books.

Several concurrent forces contributed to the popularizing of the Romanesque Revival in the United States. The first was an influx of German immigrants in the 1840s, who brought the style of the Rundbogenstil with them. Second, a series of works on the style was published concurrently with the earliest built examples. The first of these, Hints on Public Architecture, written by social reformer Robert Dale Owen in 1847–1848, was prepared for the Building Committee of the Smithsonian Institution and prominently featured illustrations of Renwick's Smithsonian Institution Building. Owen argued that Greek Revival architecture—then the prevailing style in the United States for everything from churches to banks to private residences—was unsuitable as a national American style. He maintained that the Greek temples upon which the style was based had neither the windows, chimneys, nor stairs required by modern buildings, and that the low-pitched temple roofs and tall colonnades were ill-adapted to cold northern climates. To Owen, most Greek Revival buildings thus lacked architectural truth, because they attempted to hide 19th-century necessities behind classical temple facades. In its place, he offered that the Romanesque style was ideal for a more flexible and economic American architecture.

Soon after, the Congregational Church published A Book of Plans for Churches and Parsonages in 1853, containing 18 designs by 10 architects, including Upjohn, Renwick, Henry Austin, and Gervase Wheeler, most in the Romanesque Revival style. Richard Salter Storrs and other clergy on the book's committee were members or frequent preachers of Upjohn's Church of the Pilgrims. St. Joseph Church in Hammond, Indiana, is Romanesque Revival.

The most celebrated "Romanesque Revival" architect of the late 19th century was H. H. Richardson, whose mature style was so individual that it is known as "Richardsonian Romanesque". Among his most prominent buildings are Trinity Church (Boston) and Sever Hall and Austin Hall at Harvard University.

His disciple, R.H. Robertson, worked in a similar style, designing the Pequot Library, Shelburne Farms, the New York Savings Bank, and Jackie Kennedy's childhood home Hammersmith Farm.

The Basilica of the National Shrine of the Immaculate Conception in Washington, D.C., the largest Catholic church in North America and one of the largest churches in the world, was begun in 1920 by contractor John McShain and completed in 2017.

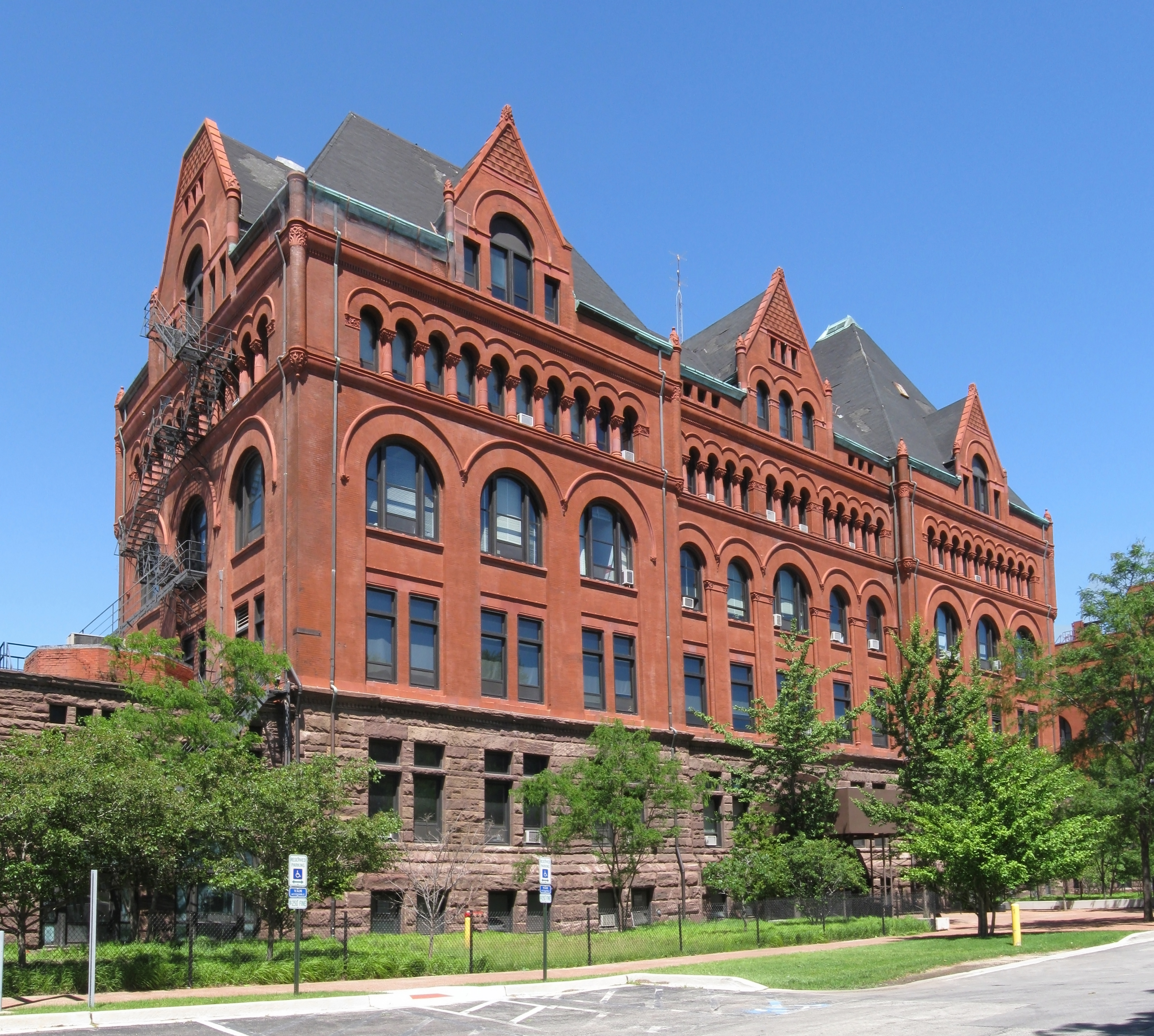
Main building, Illinois Institute of Technology

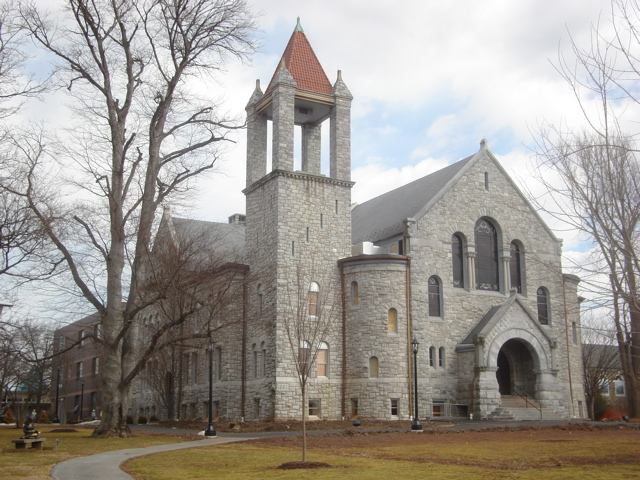
Bomberger Hall, Ursinus College, Collegeville, Pennsylvania, built in 1891

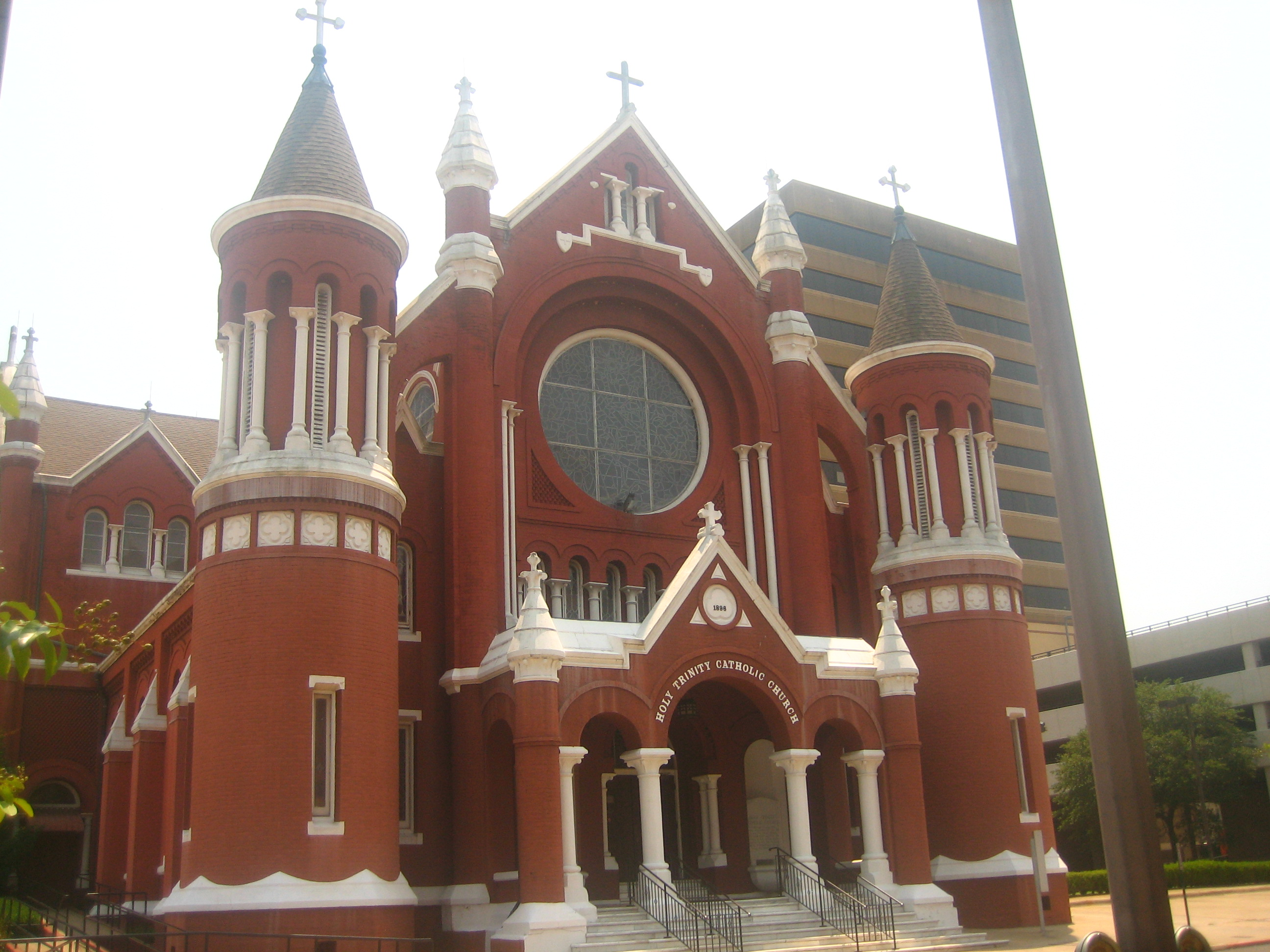
Holy Trinity Catholic Church, Shreveport, Louisiana

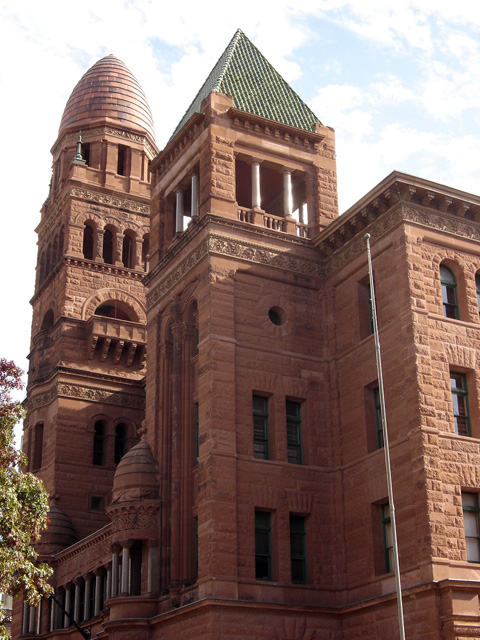
Bexar County Courthouse, San Antonio, Texas

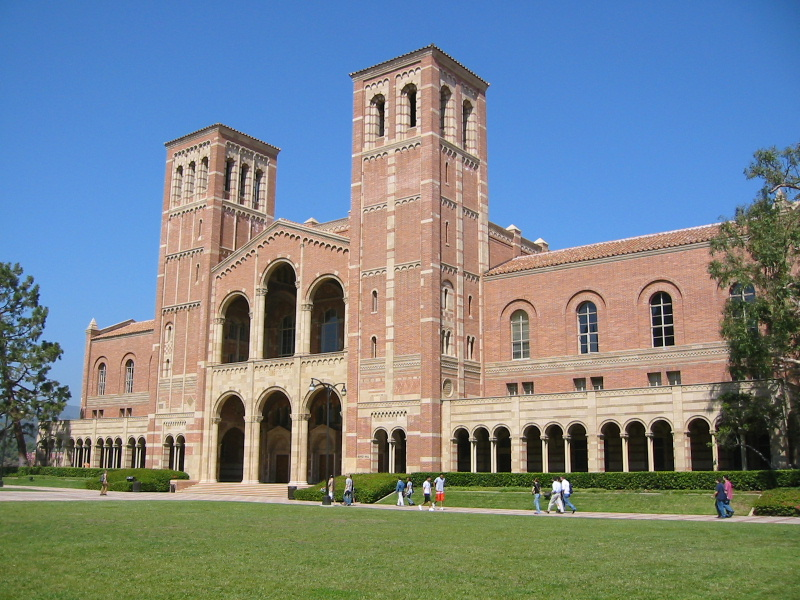
Royce Hall, University of California, Los Angeles

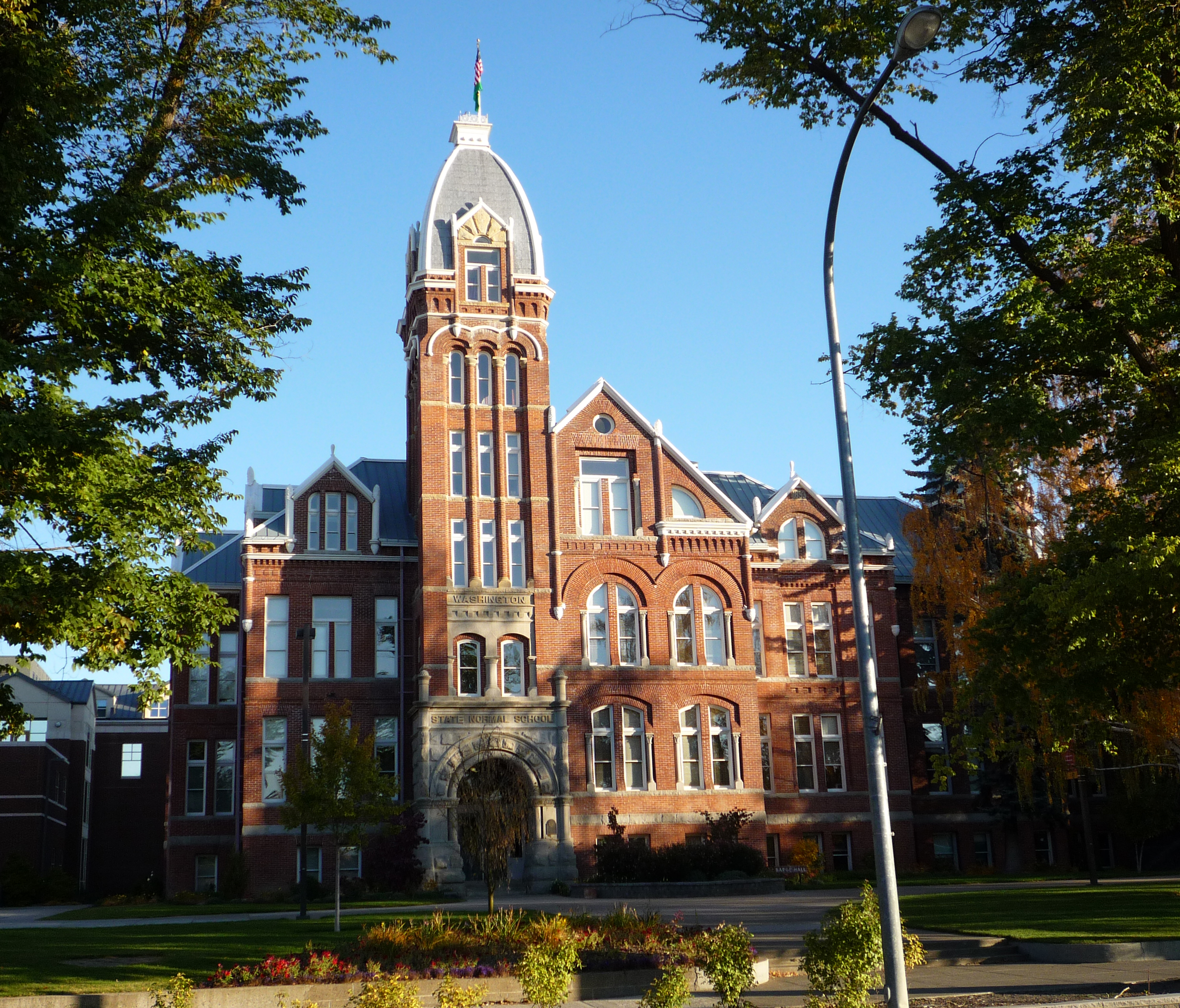
Barge Hall, Central Washington University, Ellensburg

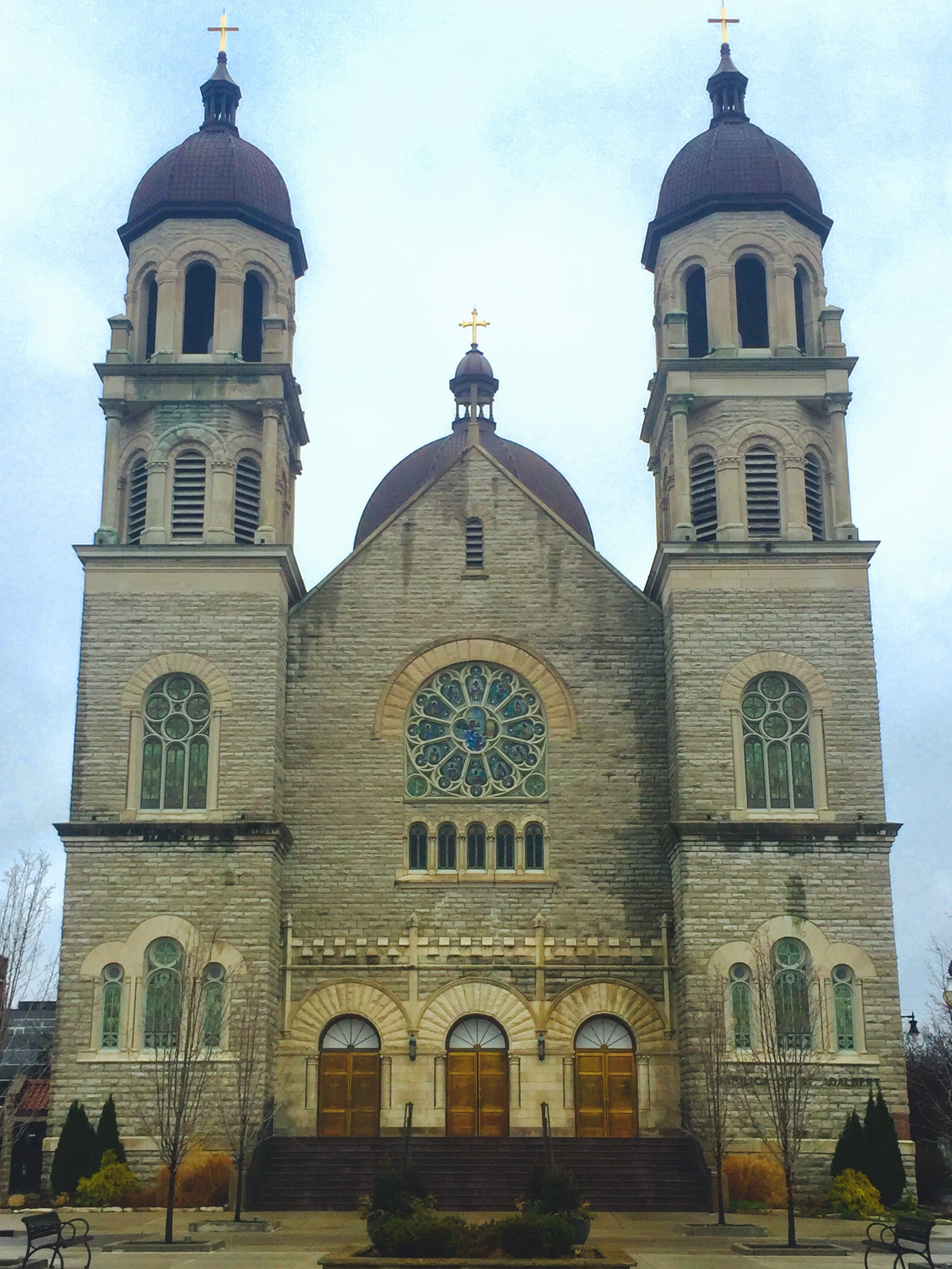
Basilica of St. Adalbert, Grand Rapids, Michigan, completed in 1913

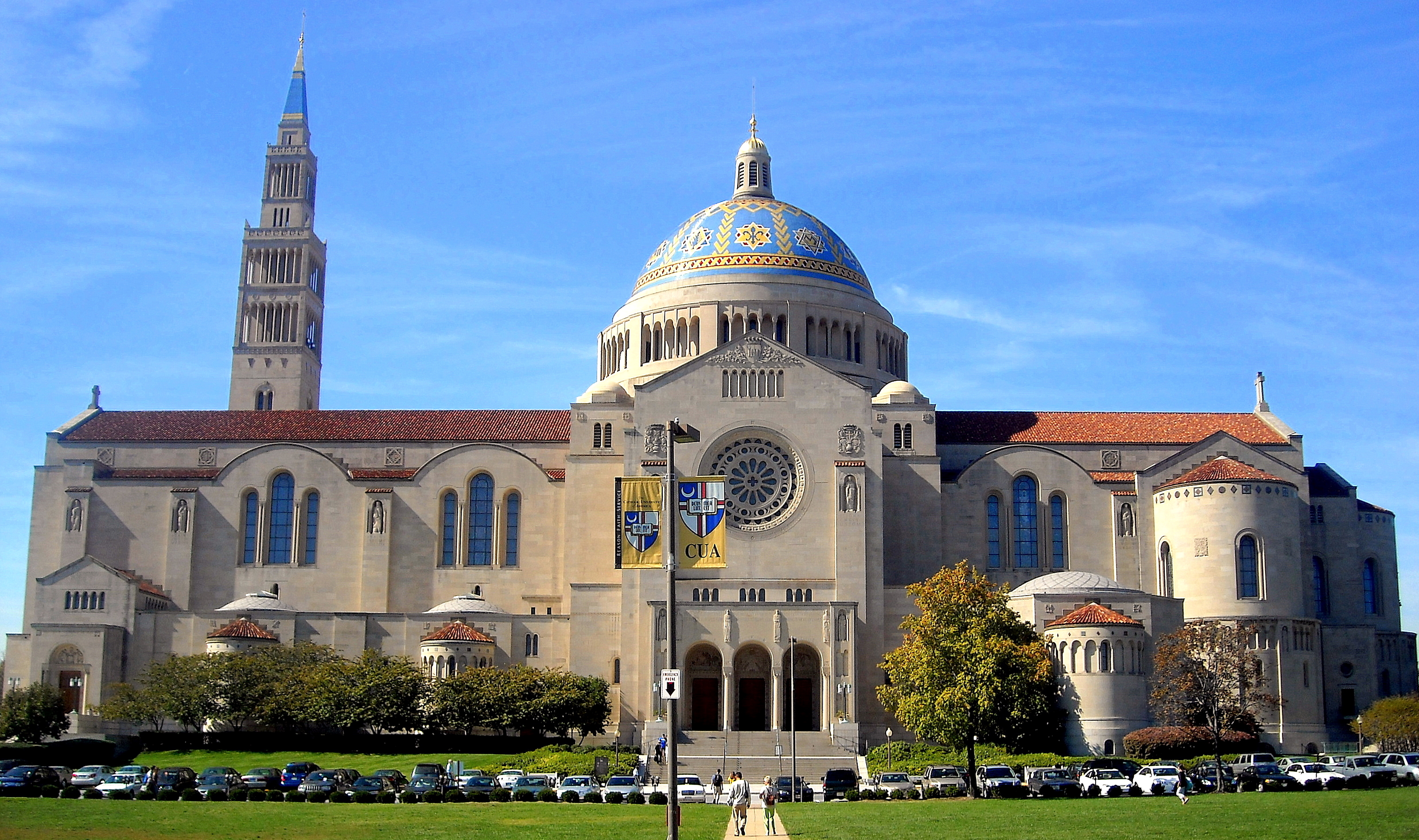
Basilica of the National Shrine of the Immaculate Conception, Washington D.C.

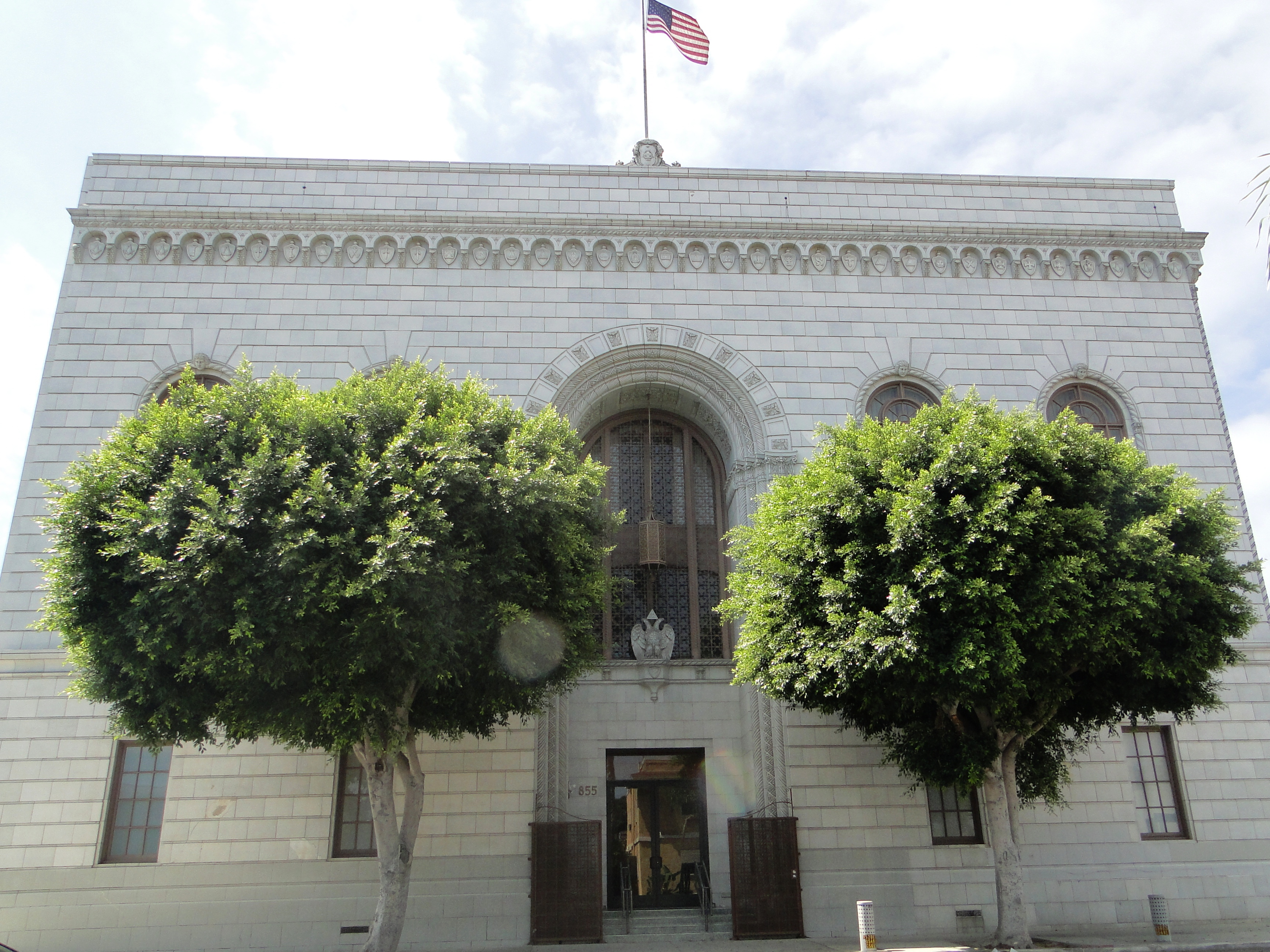
Scottish Rite Cathedral, Long Beach, California, built in 1926

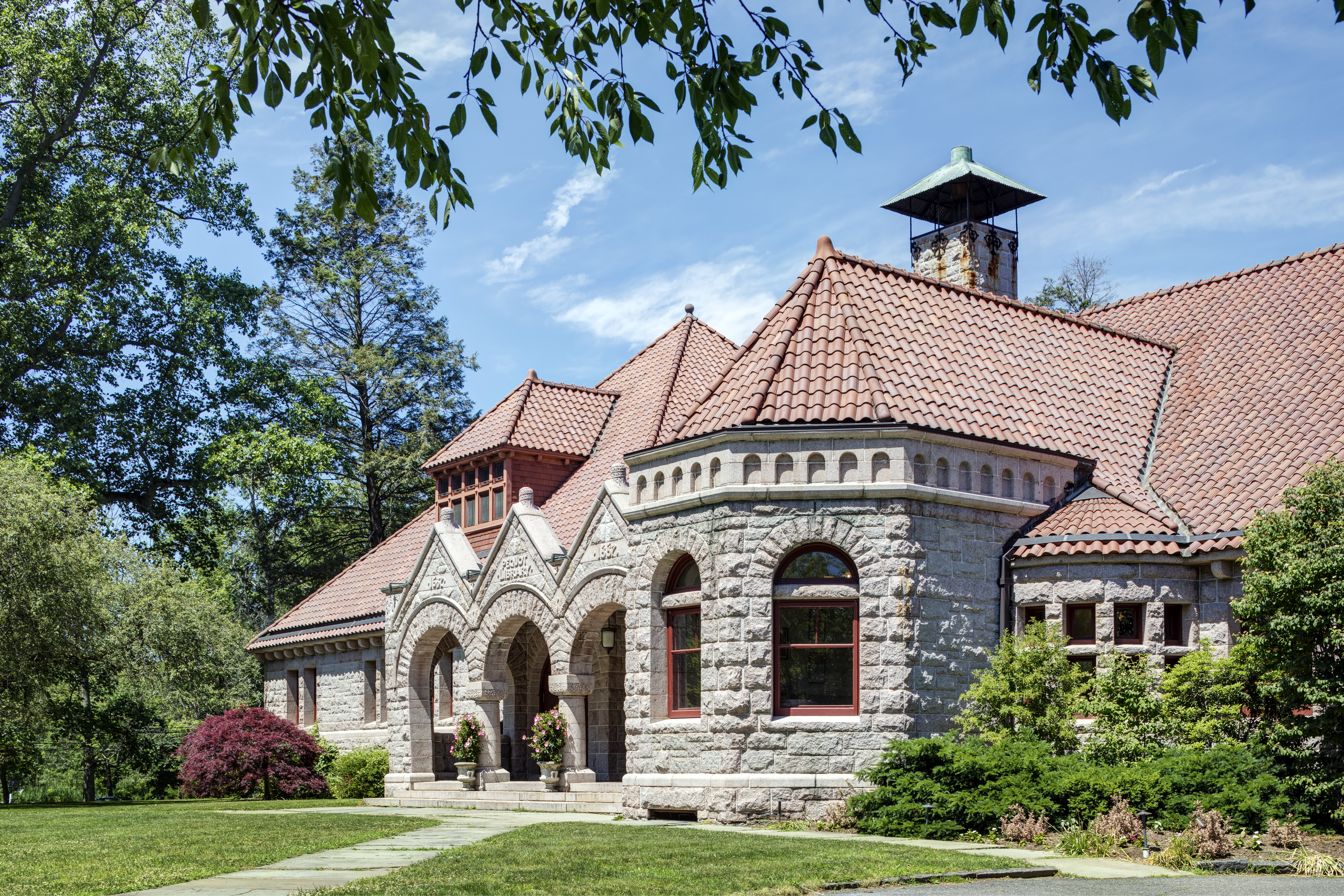
Pequot Library, Southport, Connecticut, completed in 1894

== Gallery ==
Other worldwide examples of Romanesque Revival architecture include:

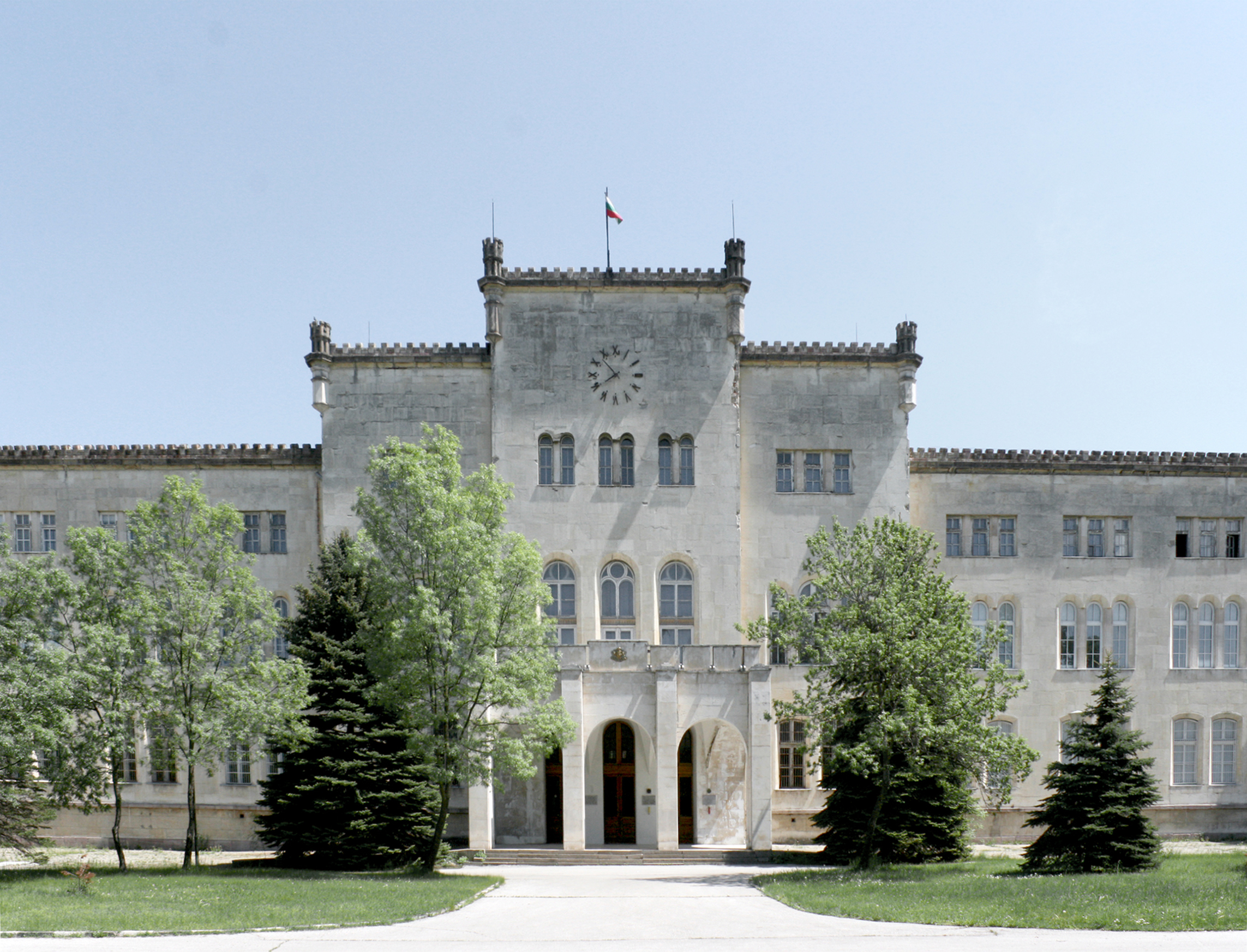
Georgi Rakovski Military Academy, Sofia, Bulgaria

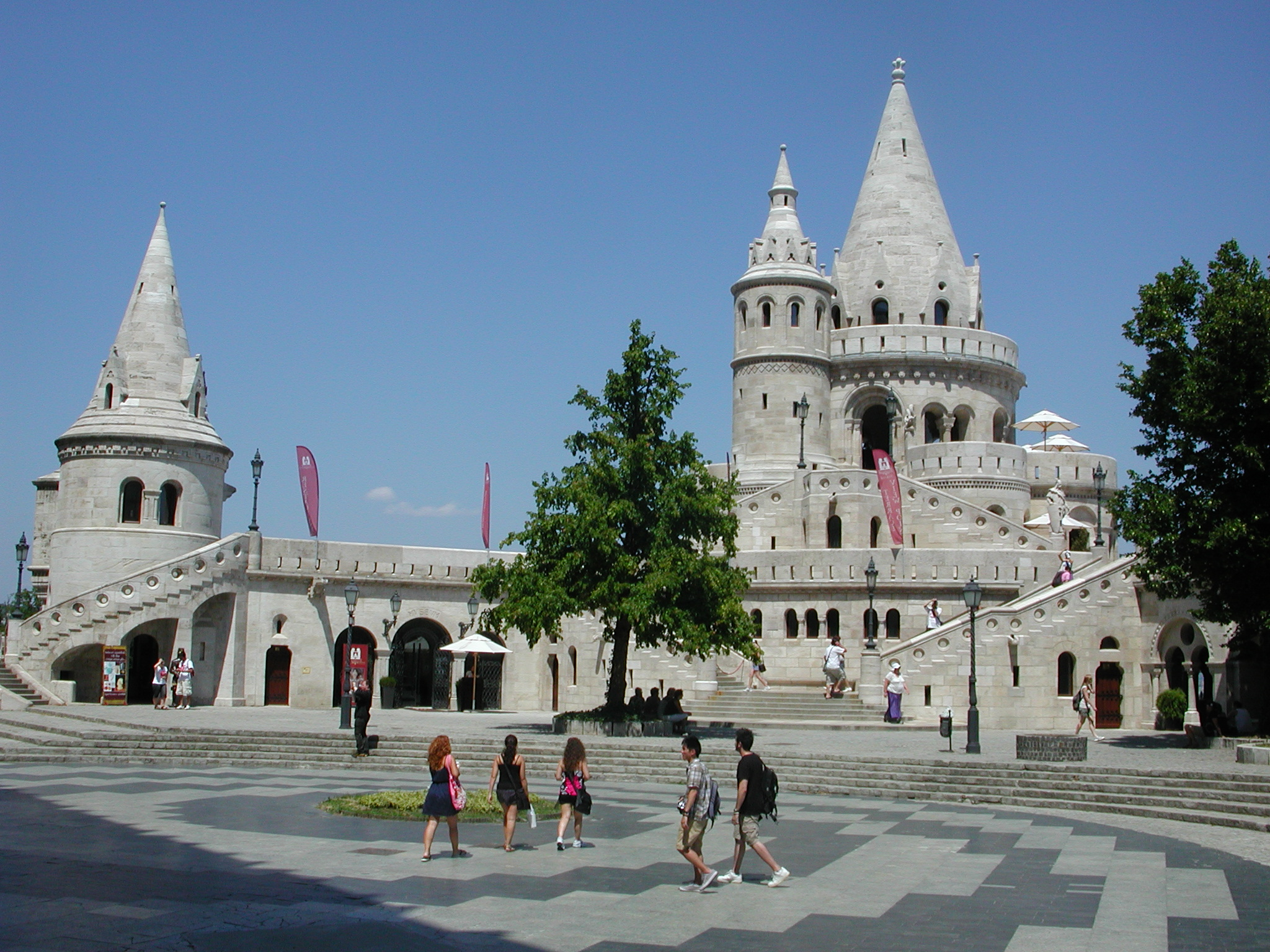
Fisherman's Bastion, Budapest, Hungary

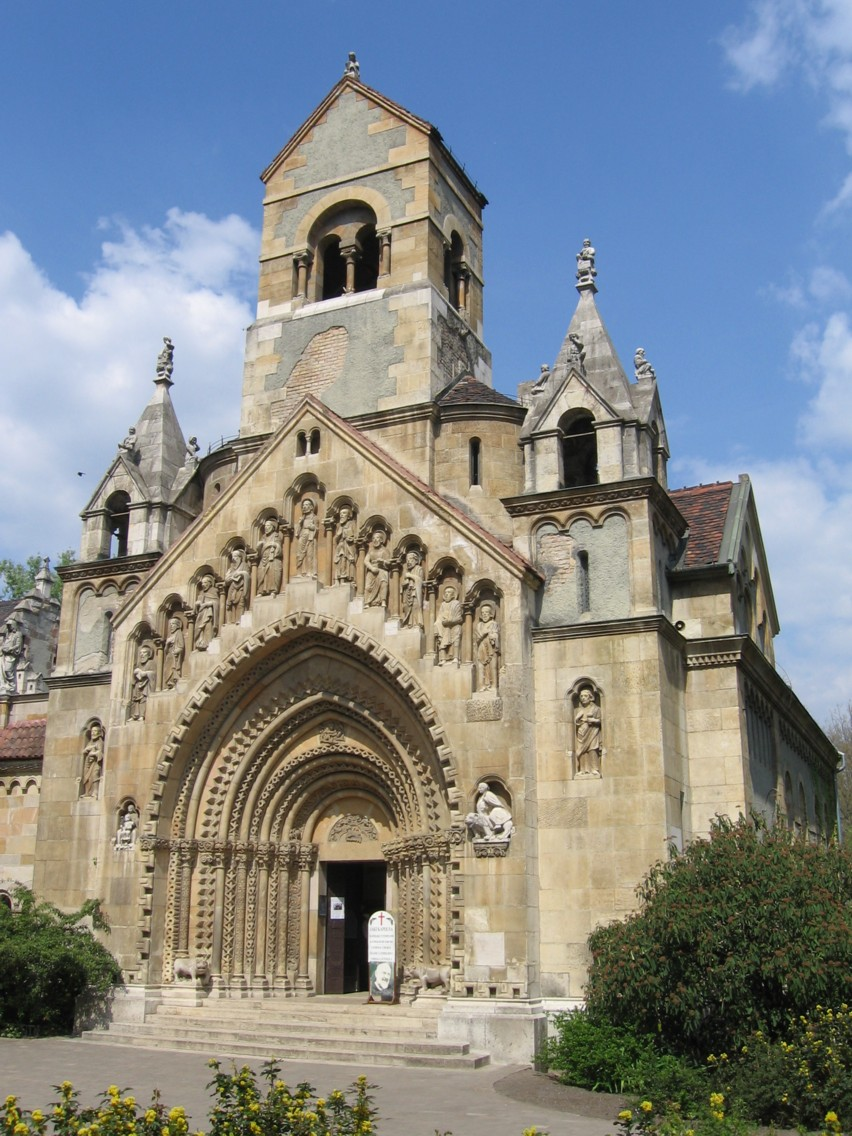
Chapel, Vajdahunyad Castle, Budapest, Hungary

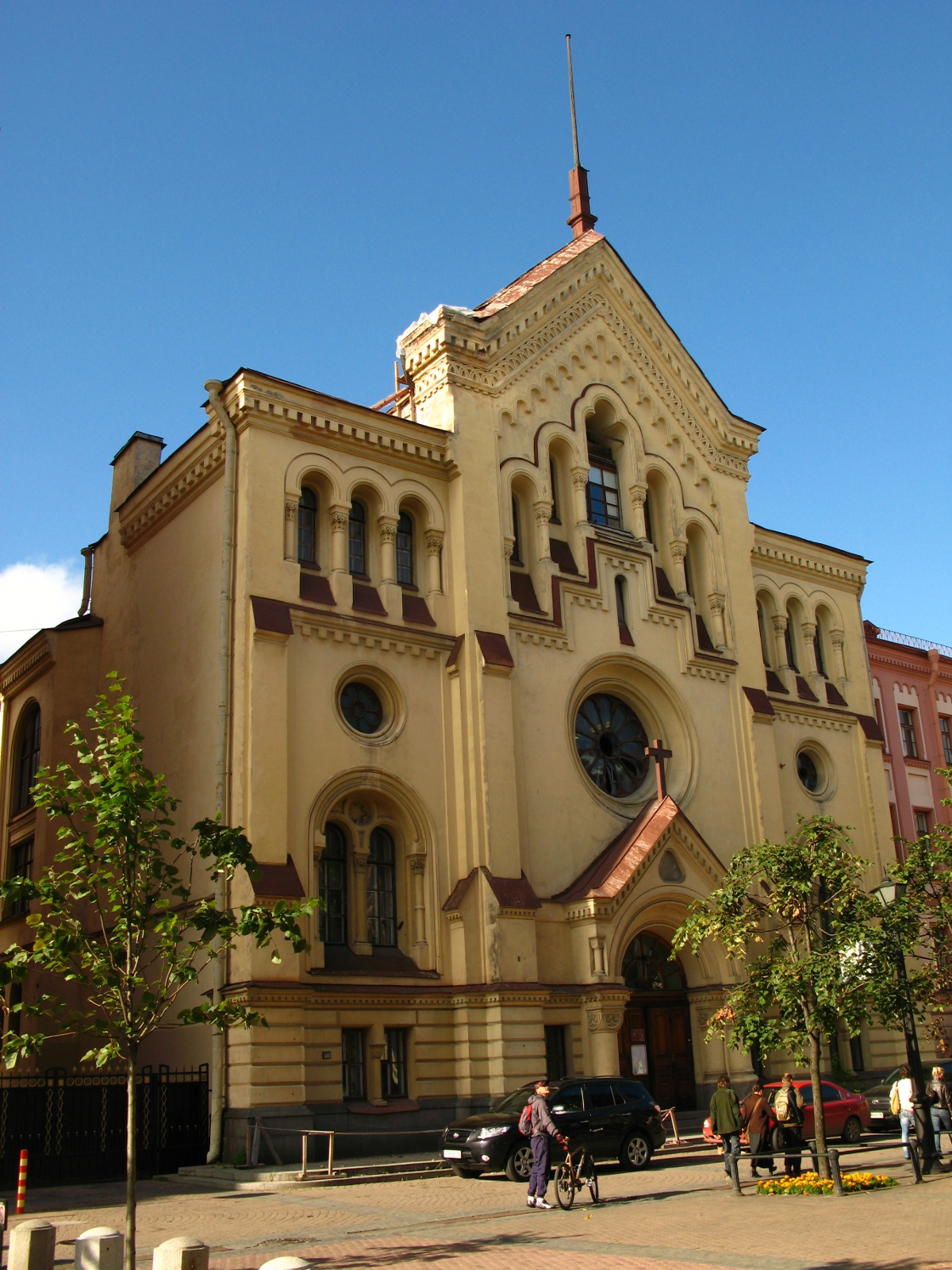
Evangelical Lutheran Church of Saint Katarina, Saint Petersburg, Russia

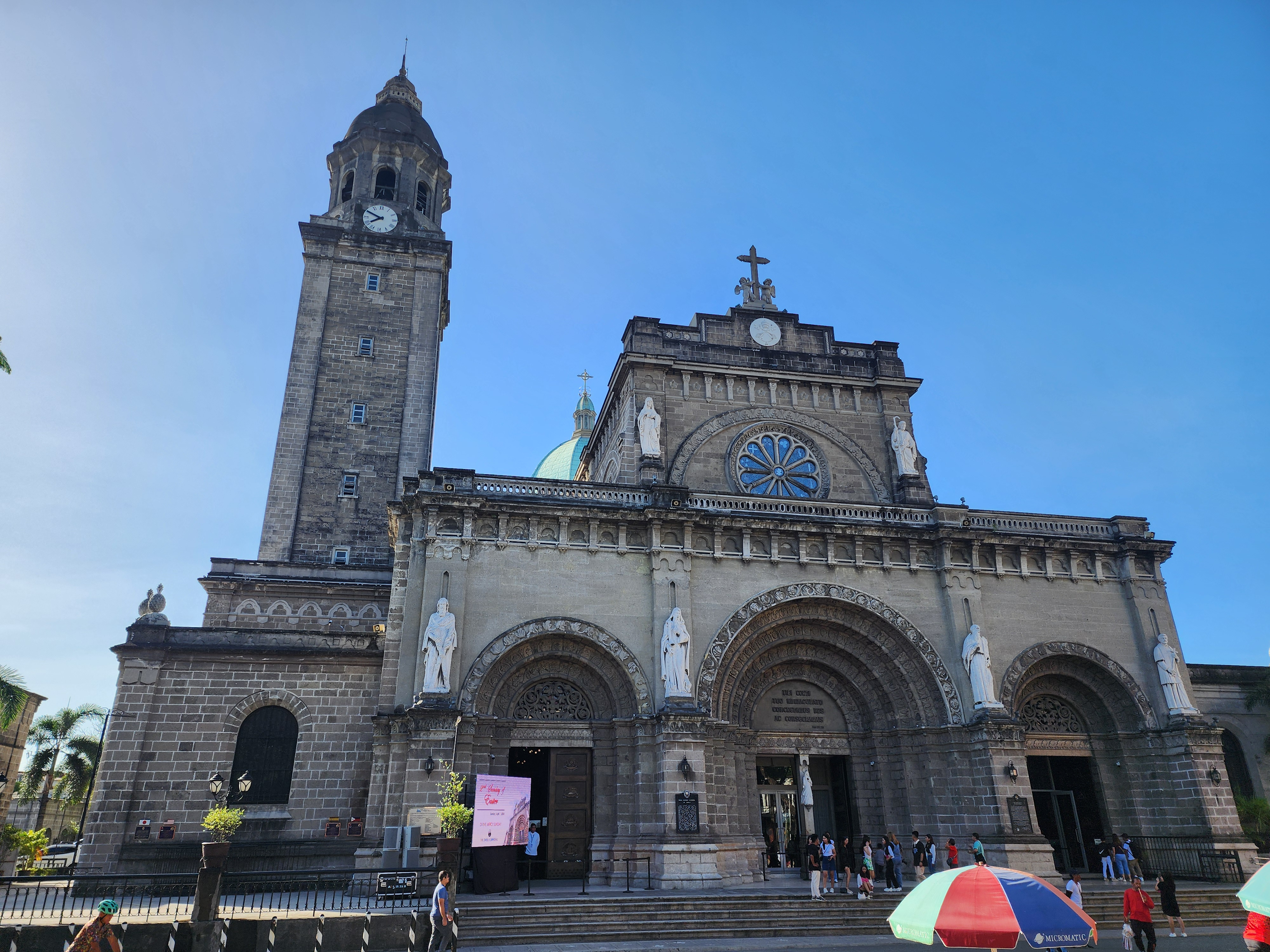
Manila Cathedral, Philippines

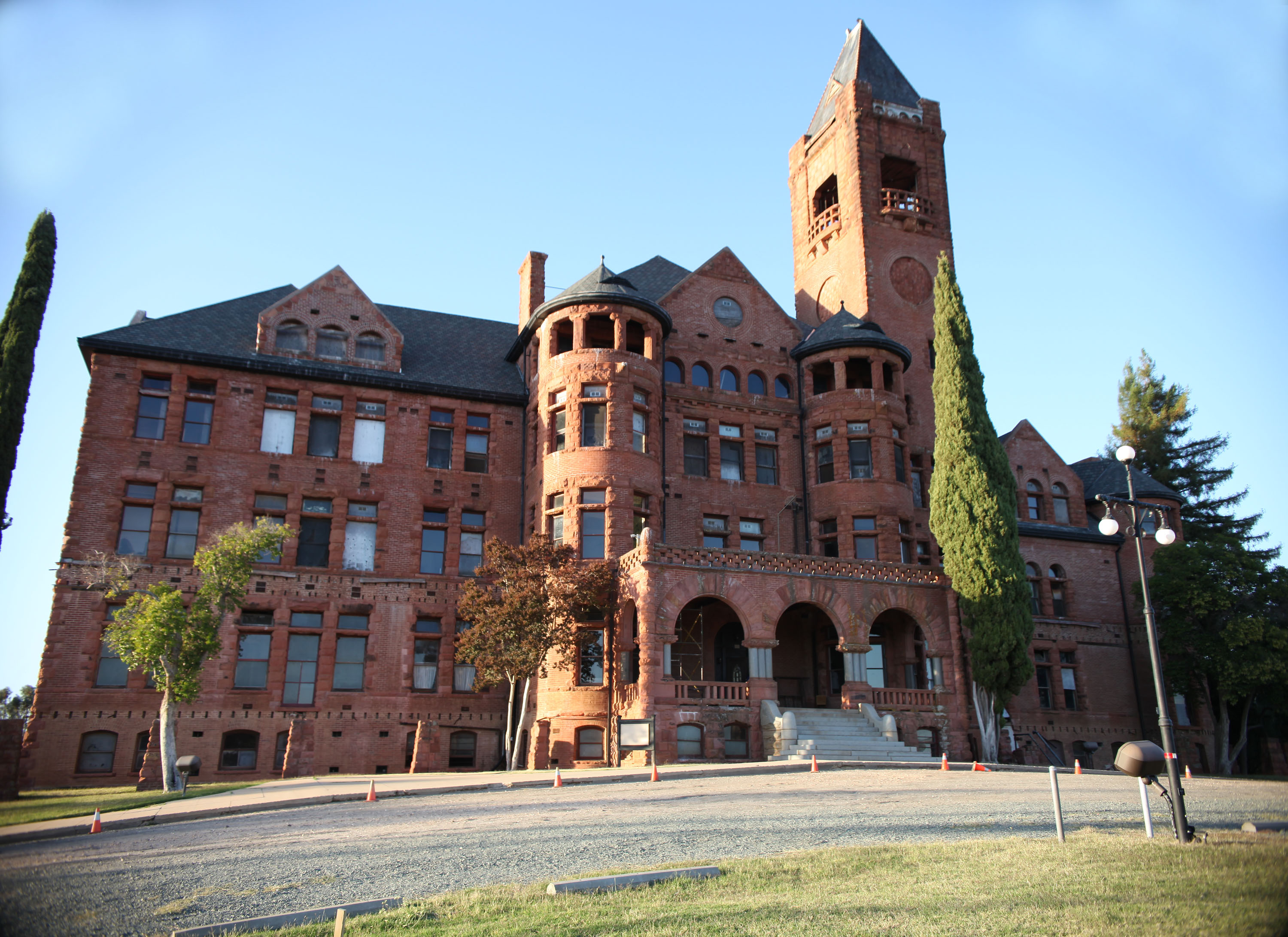
Preston School of Industry, Ione, California

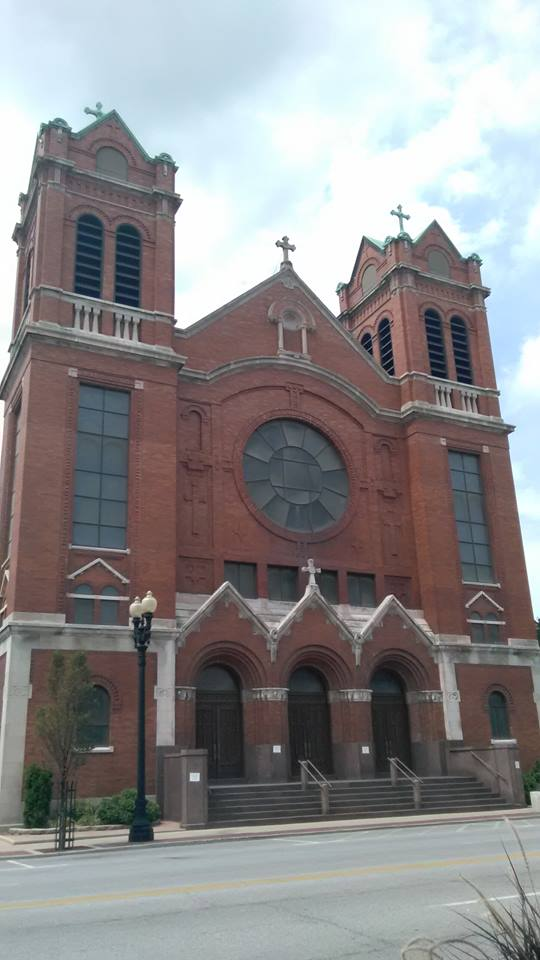
St. Joseph Church, Hammond, Indiana

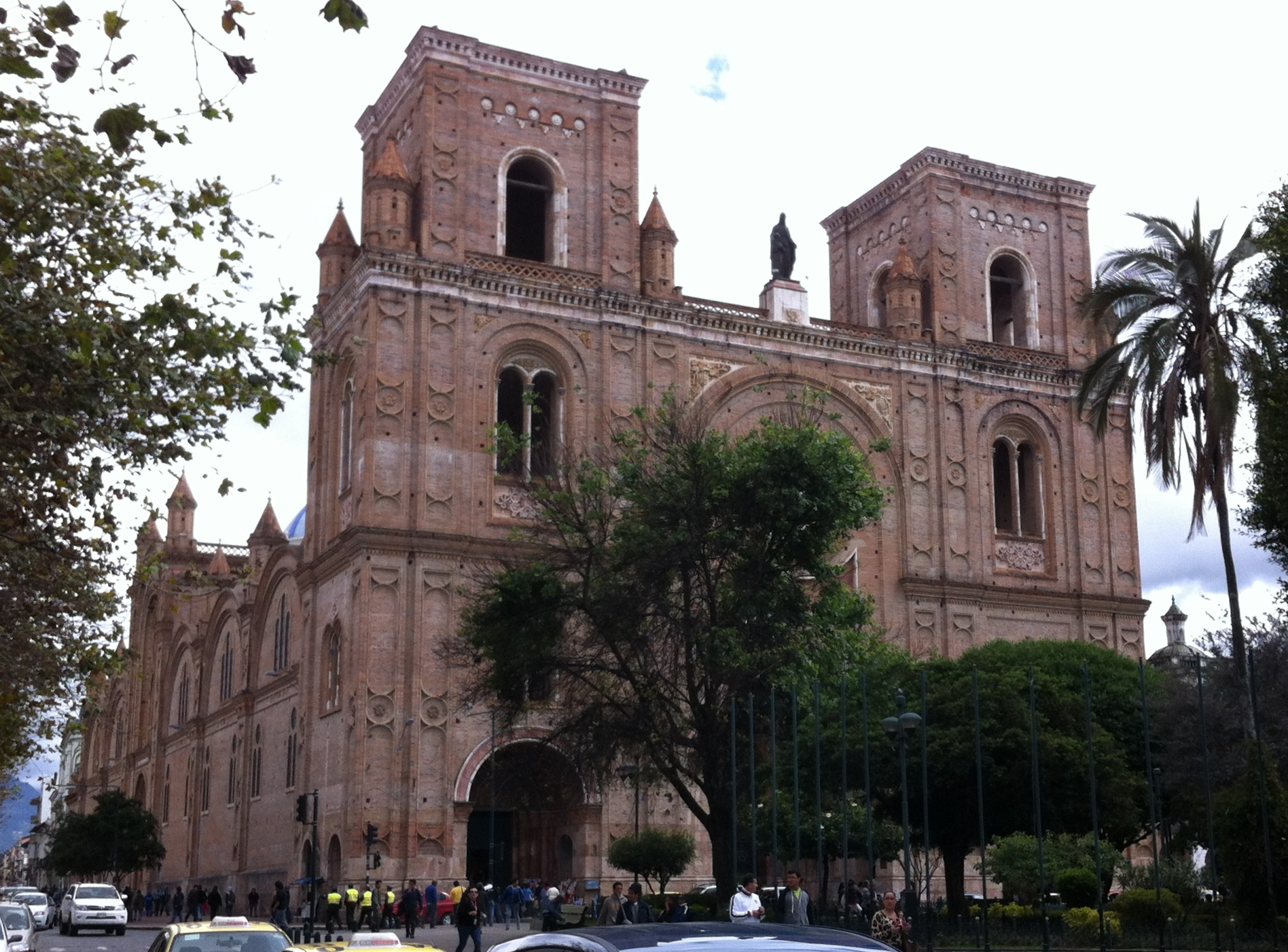
New Cathedral of Cuenca, Ecuador

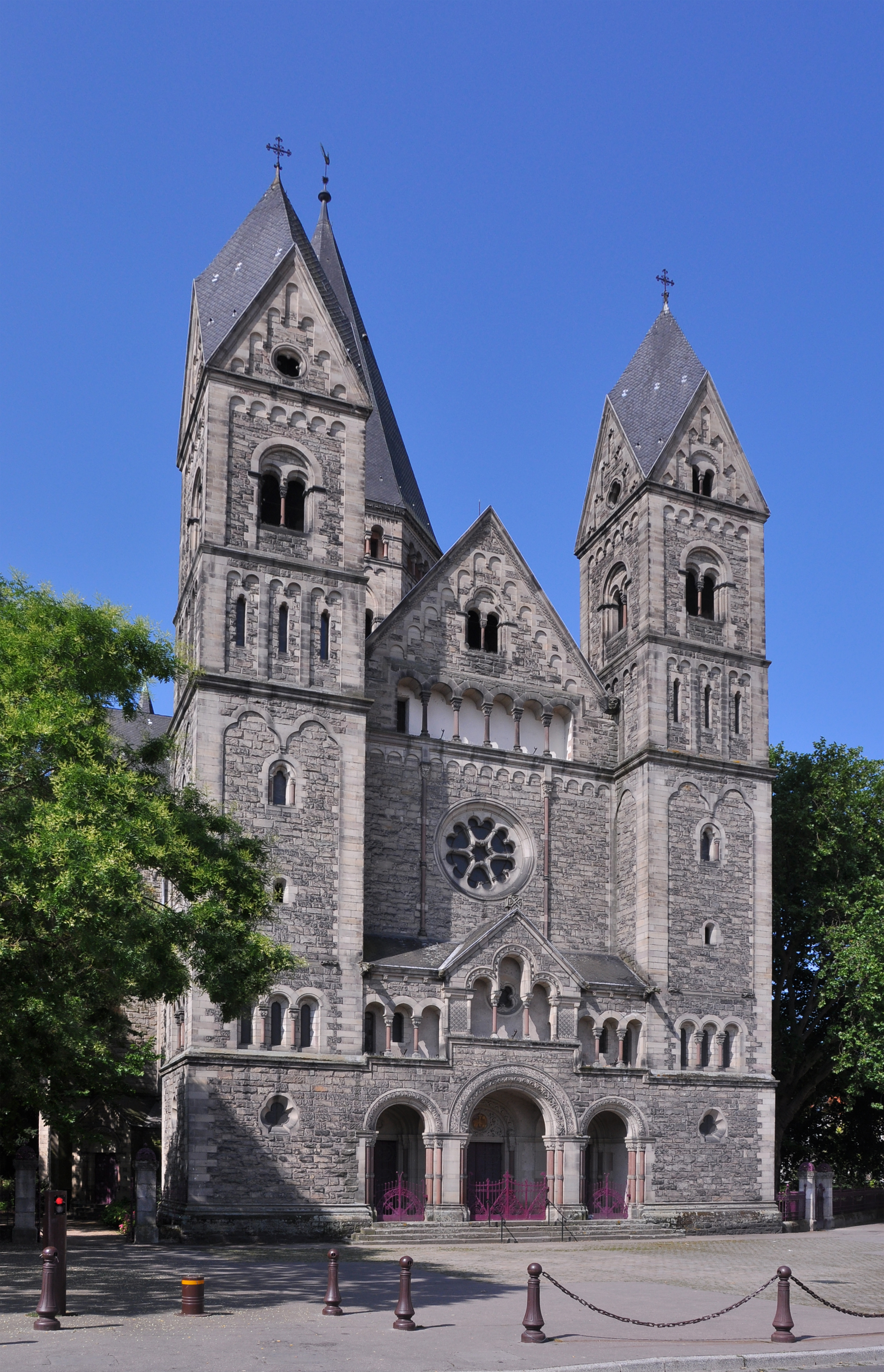
Temple Neuf, Metz

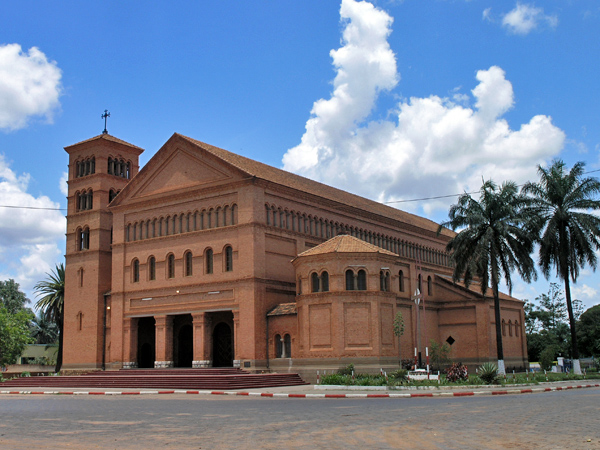
Sts. Peter and Paul Cathedral, Lubumbashi in the Democratic Republic of the Congo, 1920

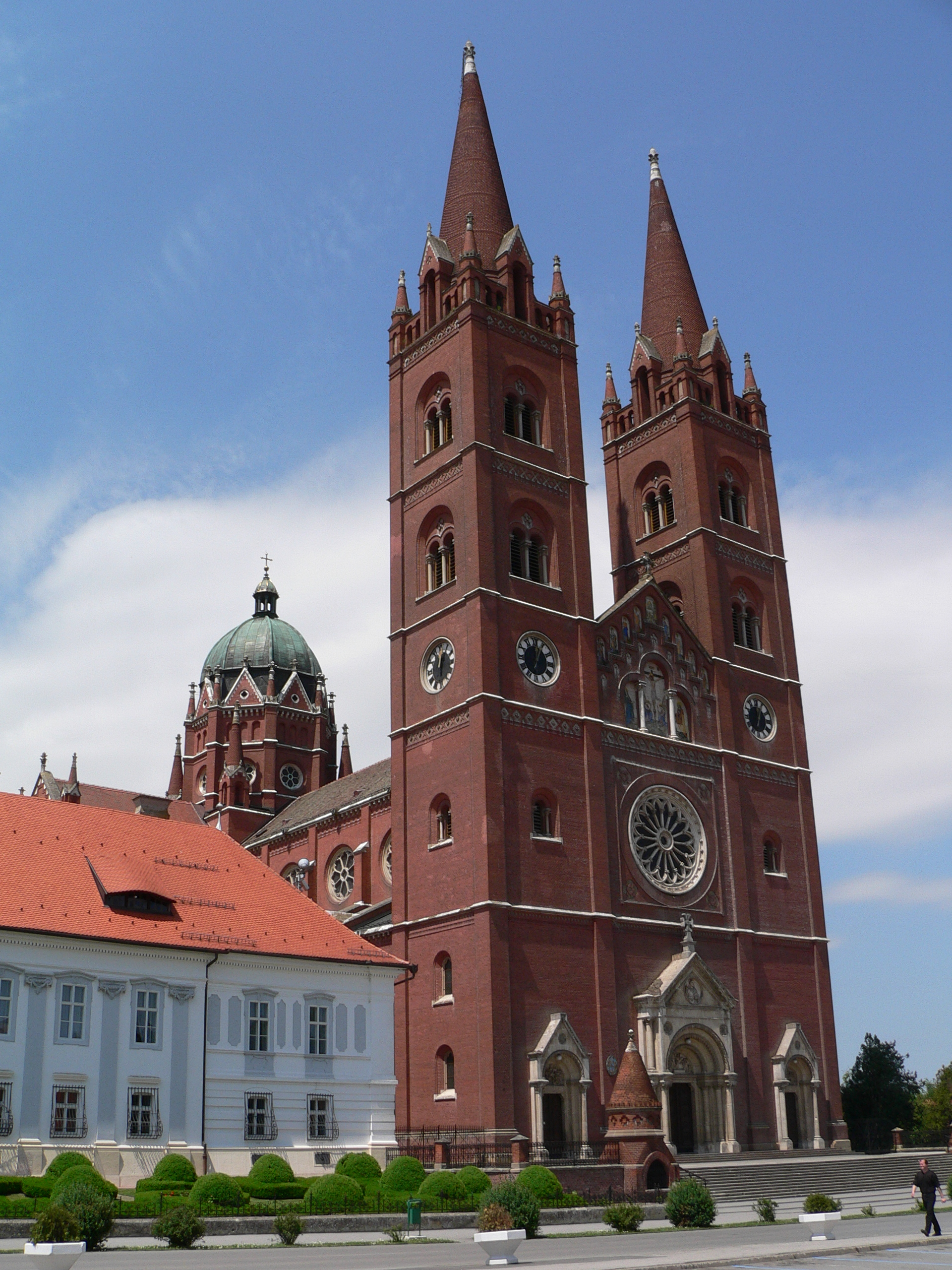
Đakovo Cathedral, Croatia

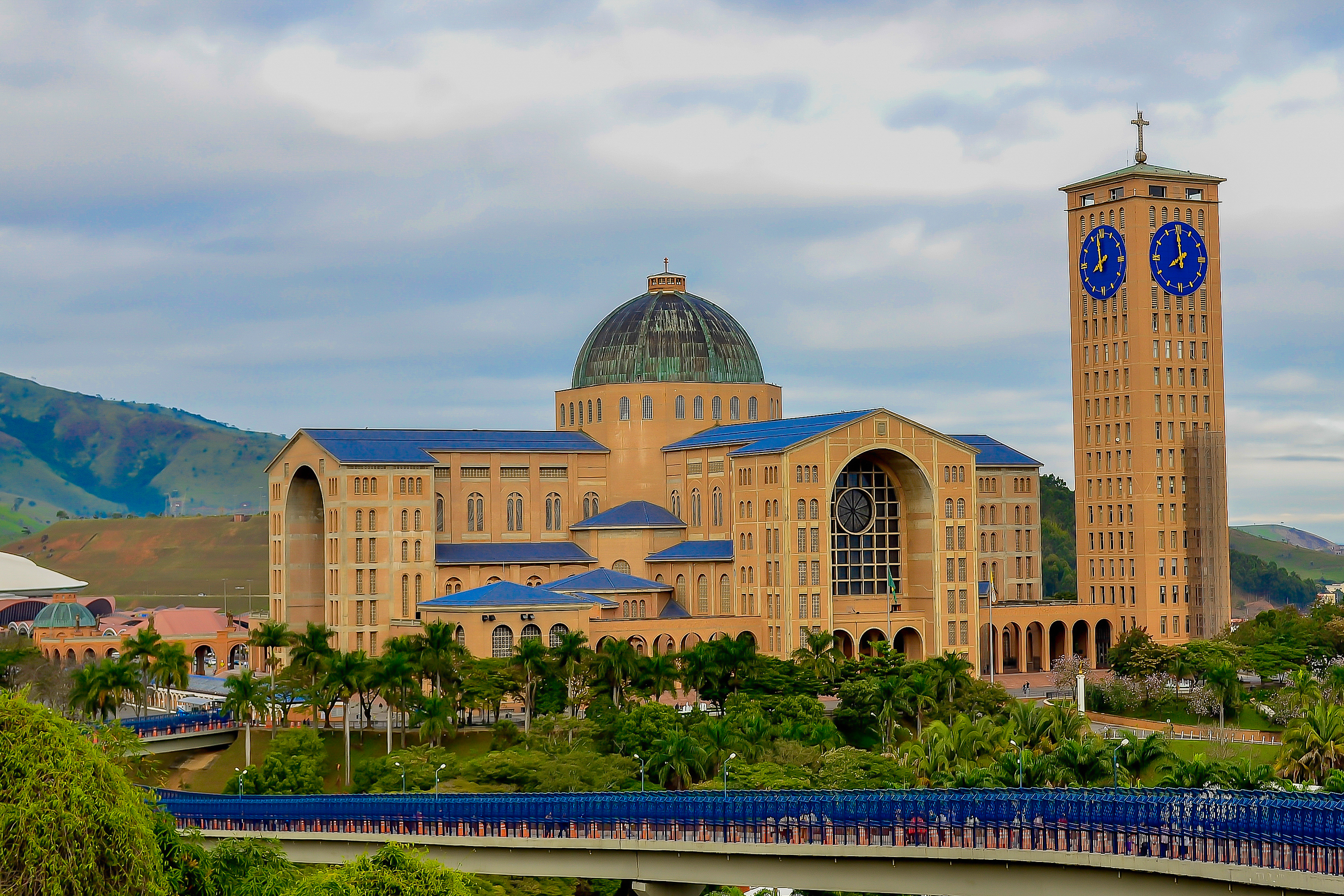
Basilica of Our Lady of Aparecida, Brazil

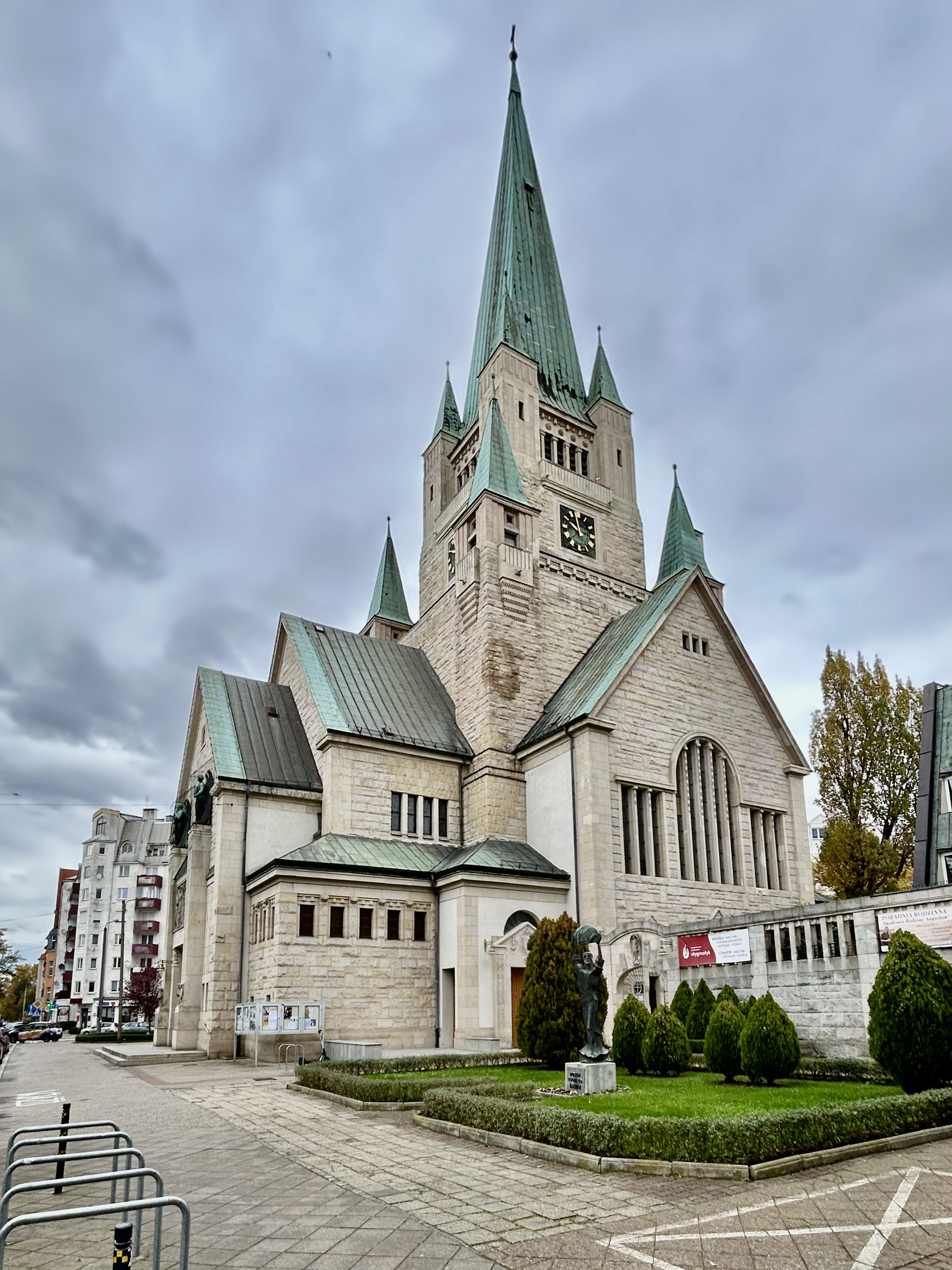
Saint Augustinus church in Wrocław, Poland

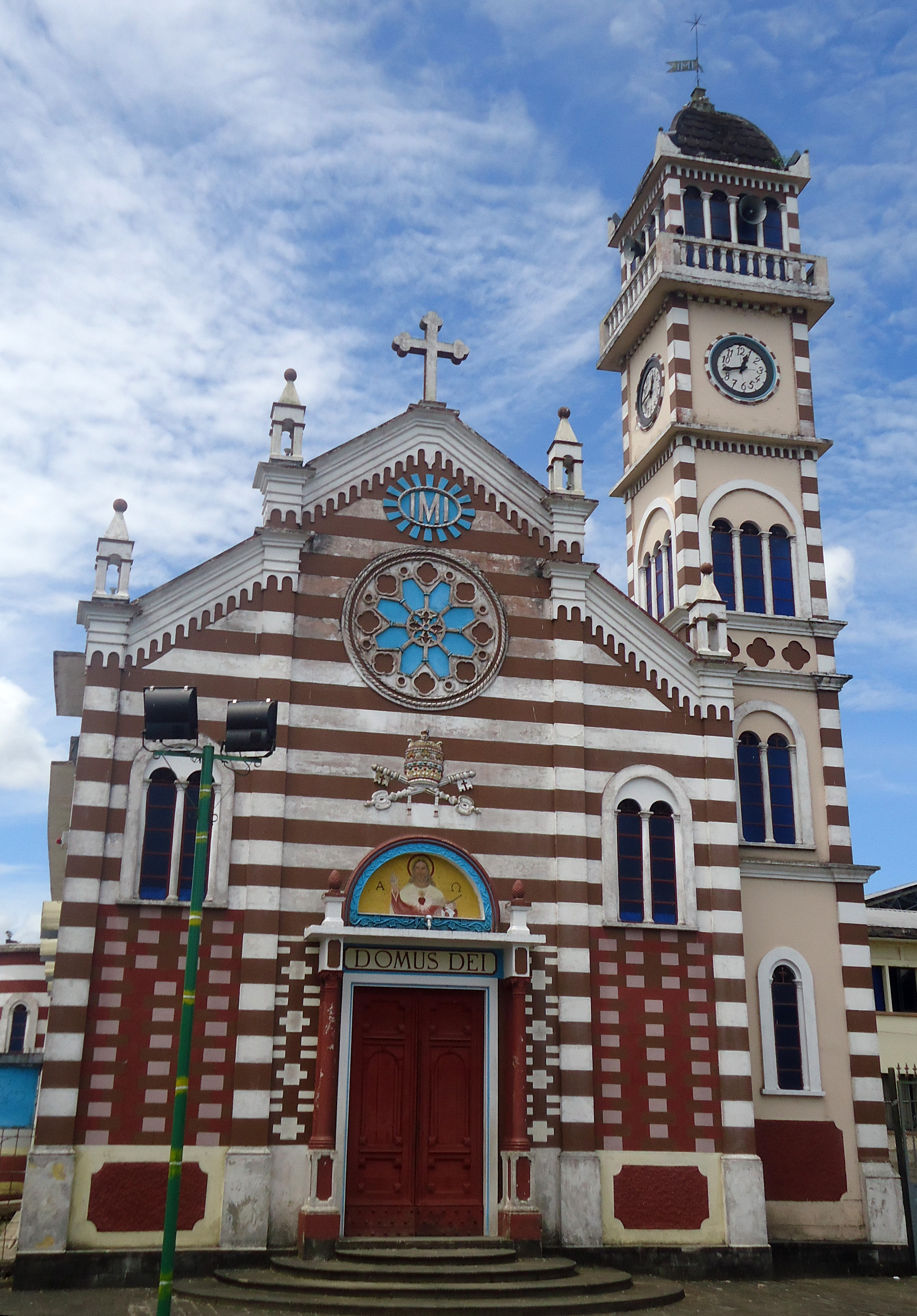
Church of the Sacred Heart in Archidona, Ecuador

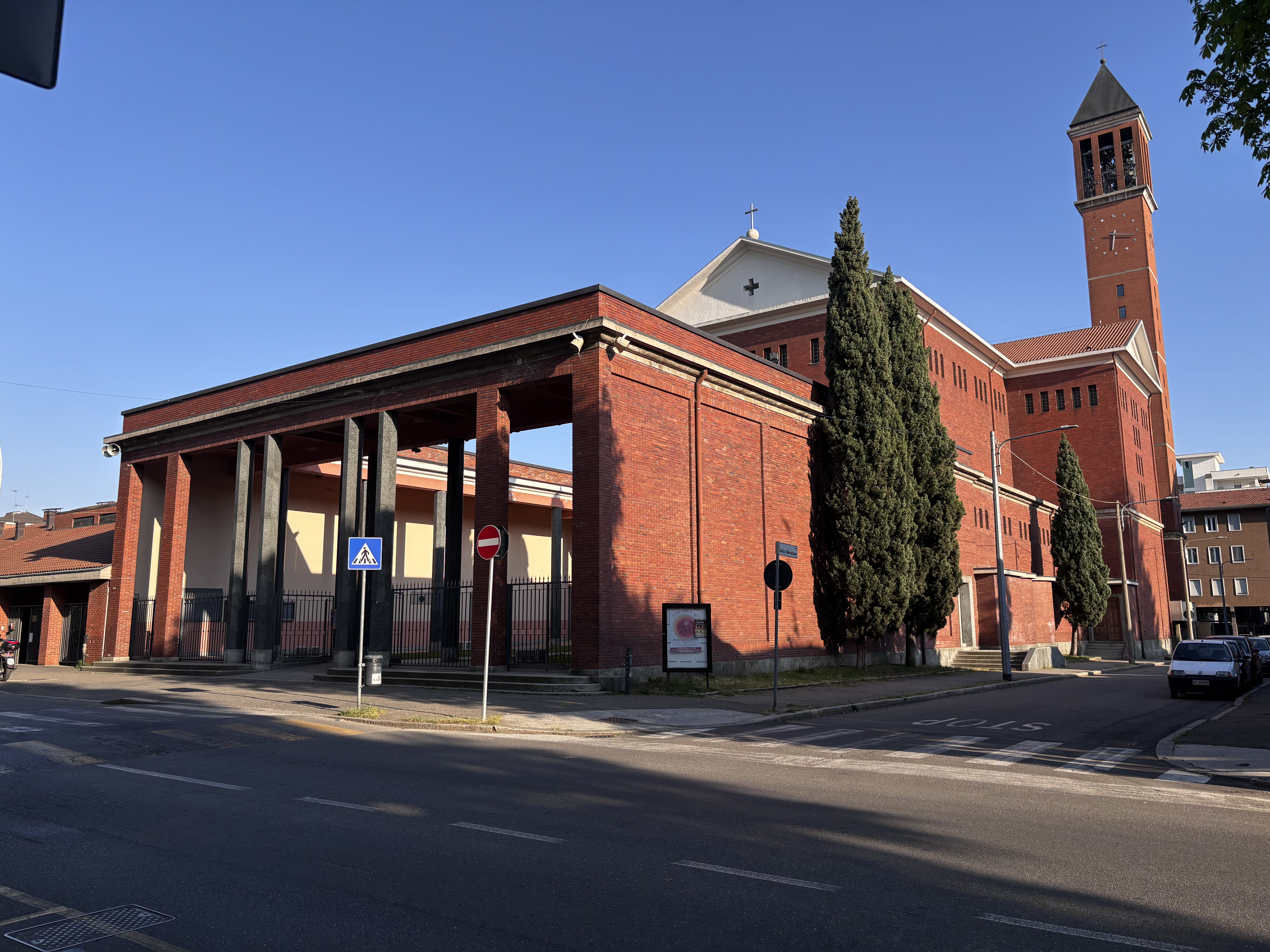
Church of Sant'Edoardo in Busto Arsizio, Italy

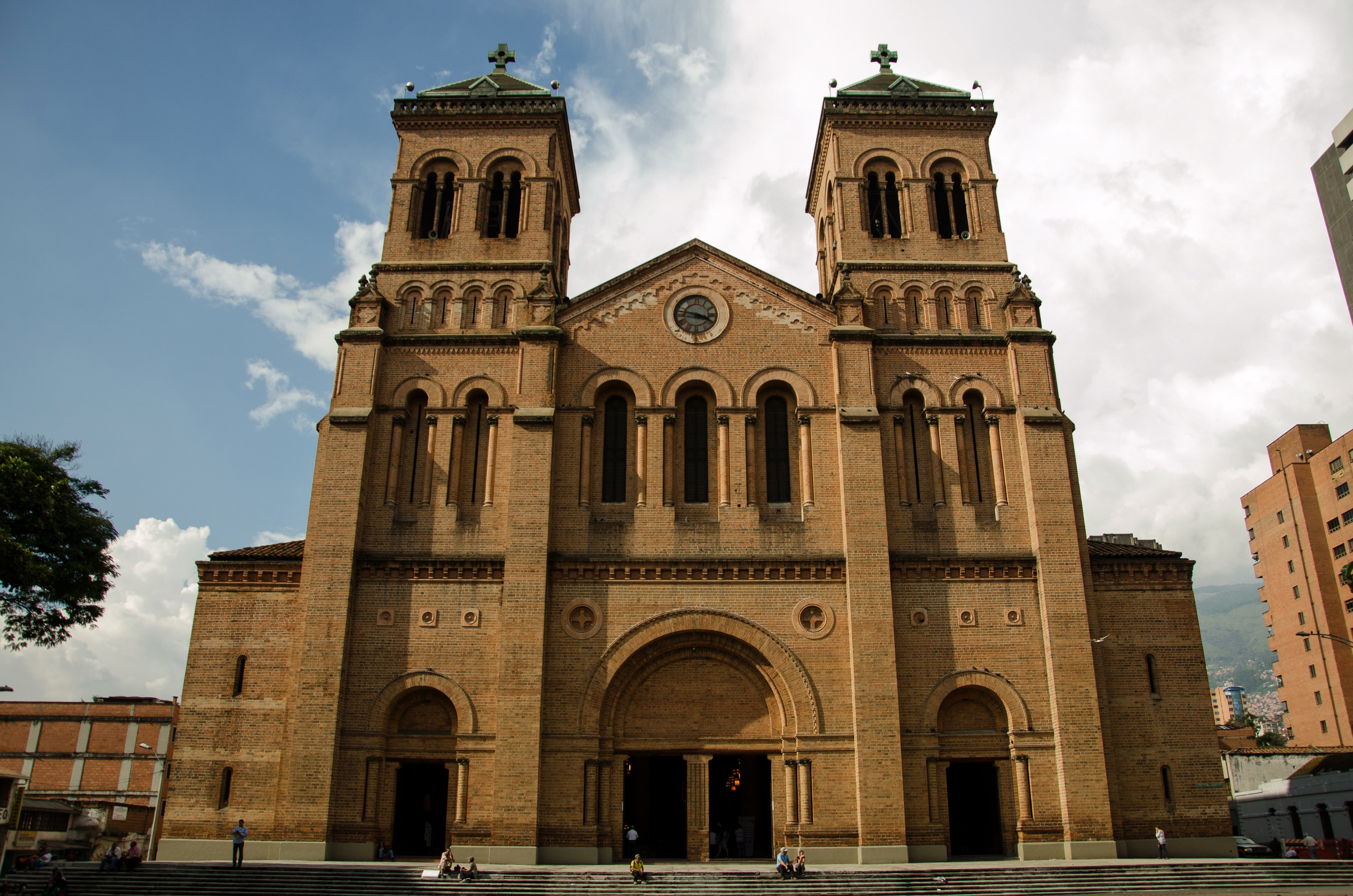
Metropolitan Cathedral Basilica of the Immaculate Conception in Medellín, Colombia

== See also ==
- Alexander Brown House, Syracuse, New York
- Gothic Revival architecture
- Museum of Early Trades and Crafts
- Romanesque Revival architecture in the United Kingdom
- Richardsonian Romanesque
- Rundbogenstil
- Venetian Gothic
