= Vasaparken, Gothenburg =

Park in Gothenburg, Sweden

Coordinates: 57°41′53″N 11°58′18″E

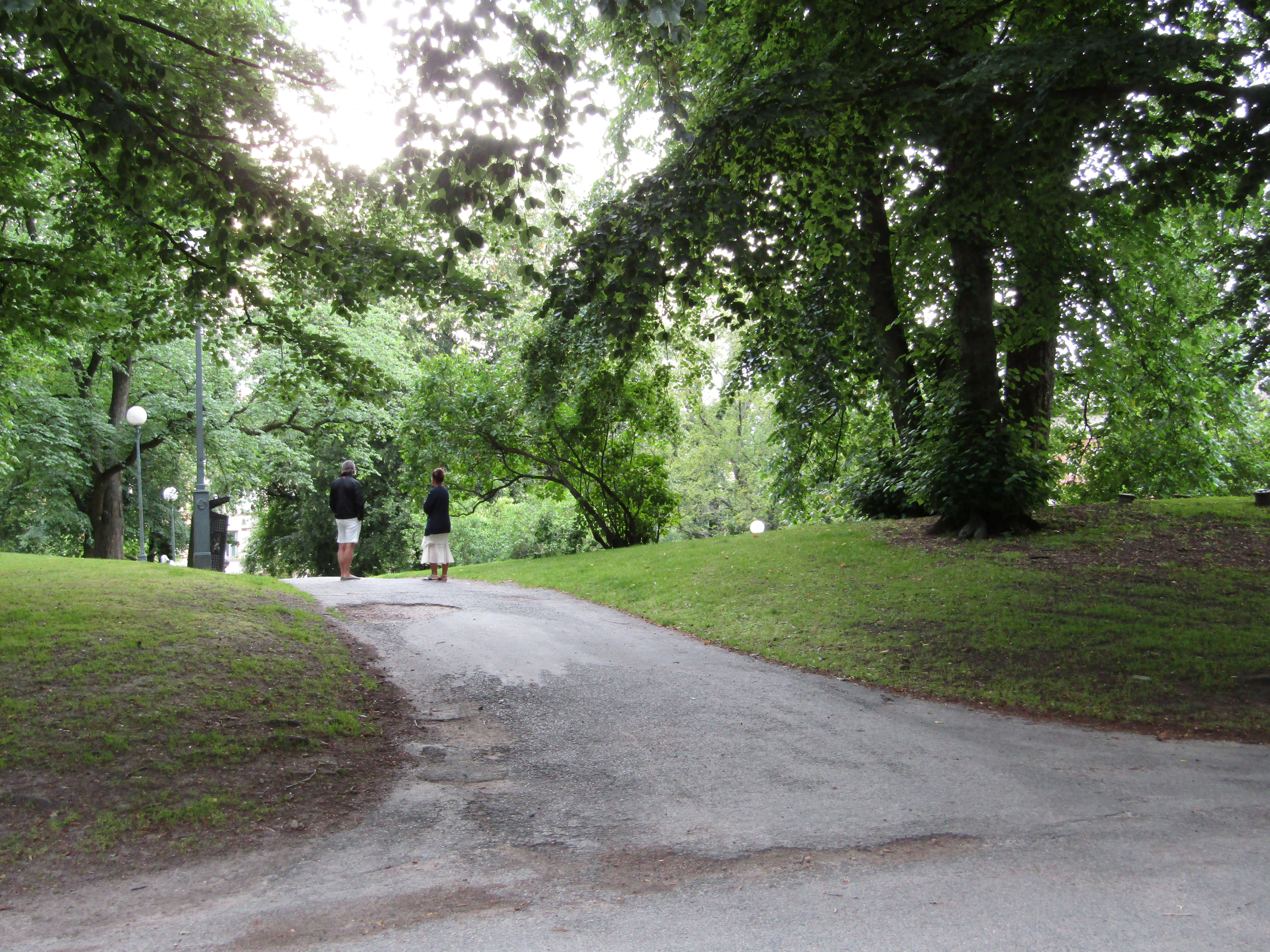
A view of the Vasaparken, Gothenburg

Vasaparken is a park in Vasastaden, Gothenburg, Sweden.

The University of Gothenburg's main building is located on the northern part of the park.
