= Vasastan, Gothenburg =

Urban district in Gothenburg, Sweden

Coordinates: 57°42′N 11°58′E

Vasastan is a district in central Gothenburg, Sweden. While nearby Haga was a suburb for the working class with wooden houses, Vasastan was built in stone in neo-Renaissance and baroque style for the wealthy middle class. Vasastan was built in the latter half of the 19th century when the city expanded outside the city walls.

== Education ==
The Gothenburg School of Business, Economics and Law are located at one end of Vasagatan and the HDK-Valand at the other.
