= Nordstaden =

Urban district in Gothenburg, Sweden

Coordinates: 57°42′29″N 11°57′52″E

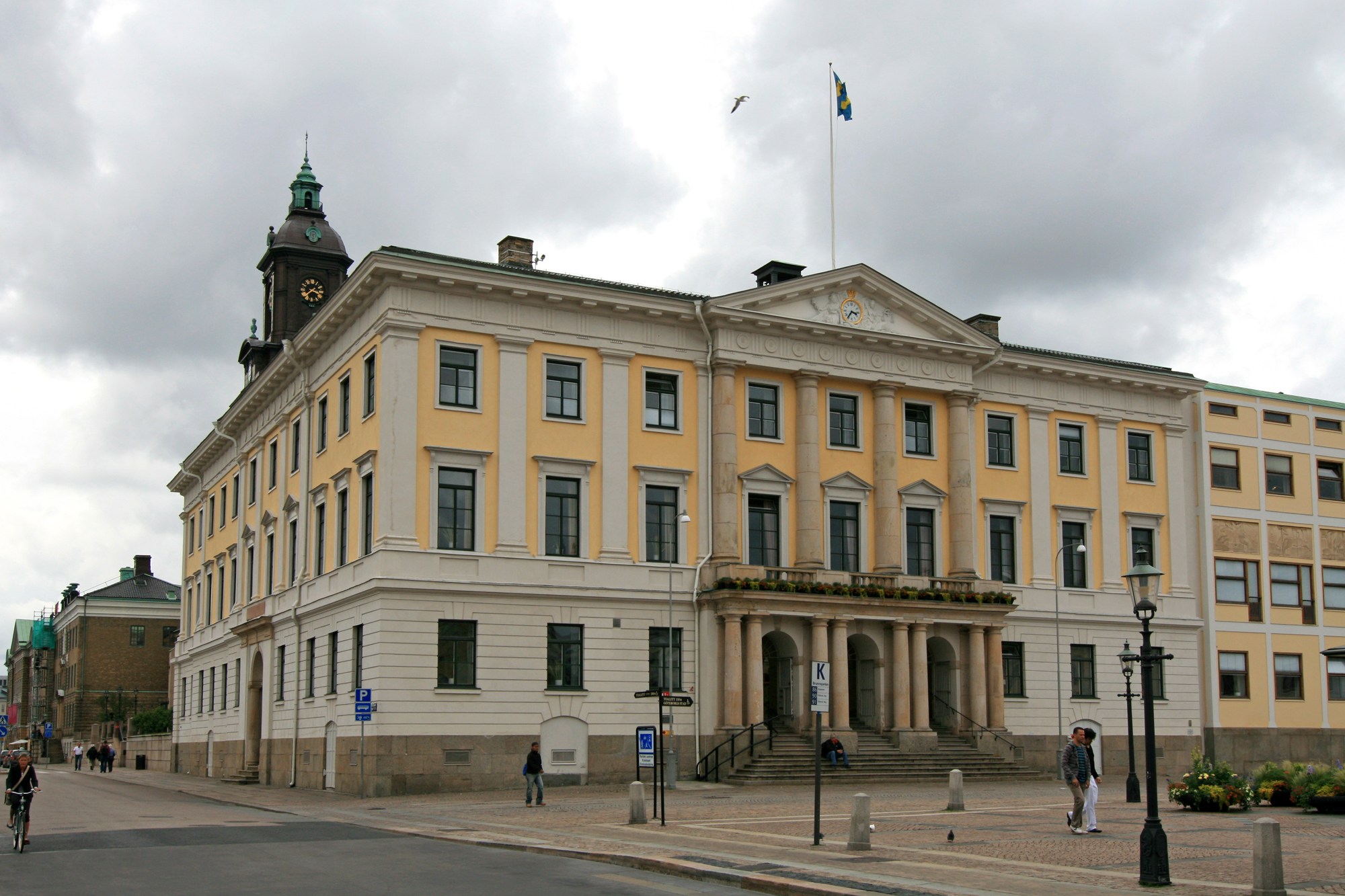
The Gothenburg City Hall on Gustaf Adolfs torg.

Nordstaden is a central district of Gothenburg, Sweden, to the north of Stora Hamnkanalen and a part of Gothenburg's original city area. The district is divided by Östra Hamngatan, previously Östra Hamnkanalen, into Östra Nordstaden and Västra Nordstaden. The district has an area of 42 hectares.

The last houses in Östra Nordstaden were torn down in May 1971 to give space for the shopping centre Nordstan.

Västra Nordstaden mostly consists of older buildings, such as Kronhuset, the Gothenburg City Hall, the Bourse, the German Church, Ostindiska huset and the former Sjöbefälsskolan. There are a couple of newer buildings, such as the Gothenburg opera house and Traktören which is one of Gothenburg's council buildings. There are also many residential areas in Västra Nordstaden, primarily on Kvarnberget.

The Gothenburg tram stop Nordstan is located in the east, between the shopping centre Nordstan and the Gothenburg Central Station.

== Listed buildings ==
There are eight listed buildings in Nordstaden:

- The Bourse
- Gamla Tullen
- The Gothenburg City Hall
- Göteborgs stadshus
- Kronhuset
- Ostindiska huset
- Sahlgrenska huset
- Wenngrenska huset

== Block division in Nordstaden ==
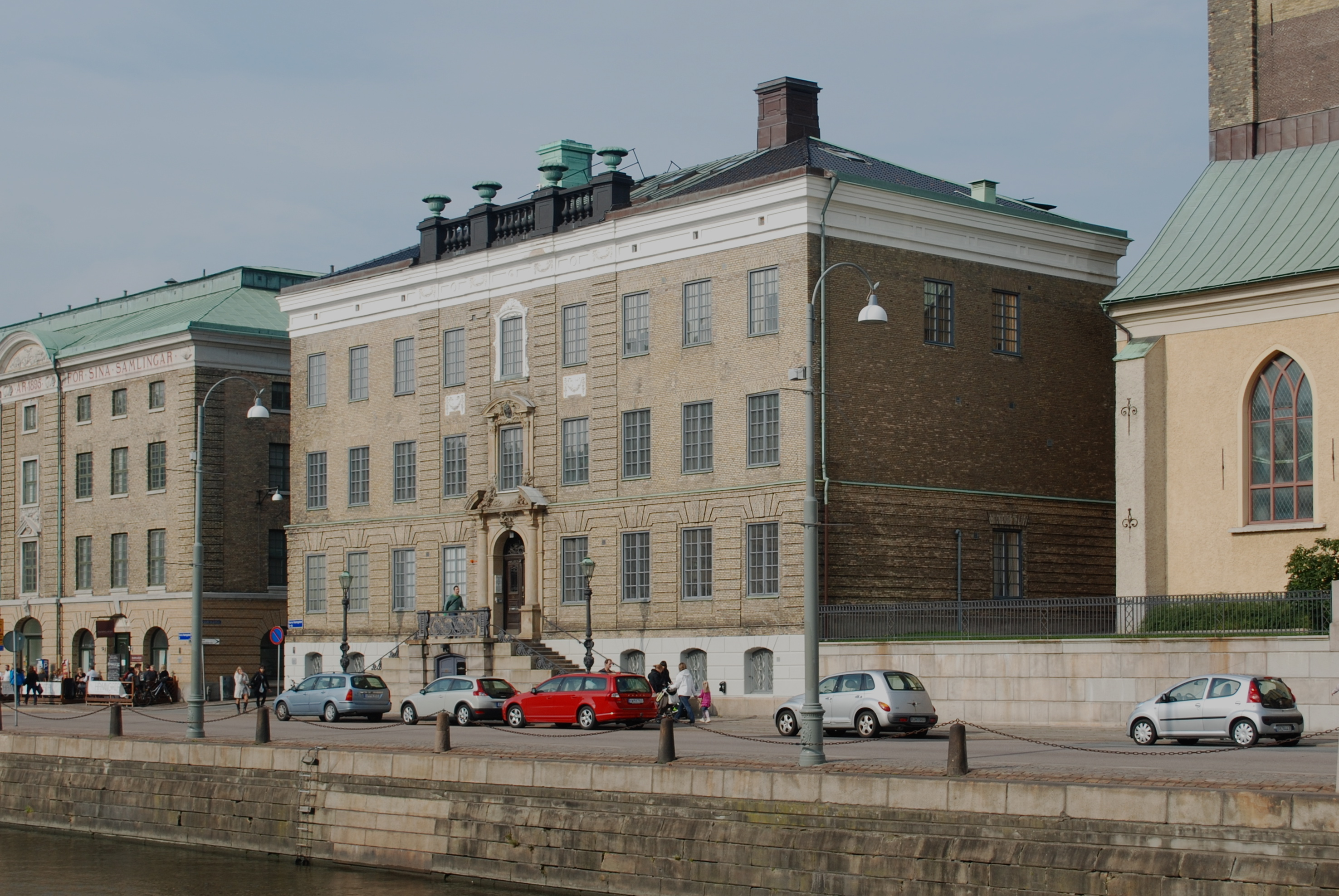
Sahlgrenska huset on Norra Hamngatan between the Ostindiska huset (to the left) and the German Church.

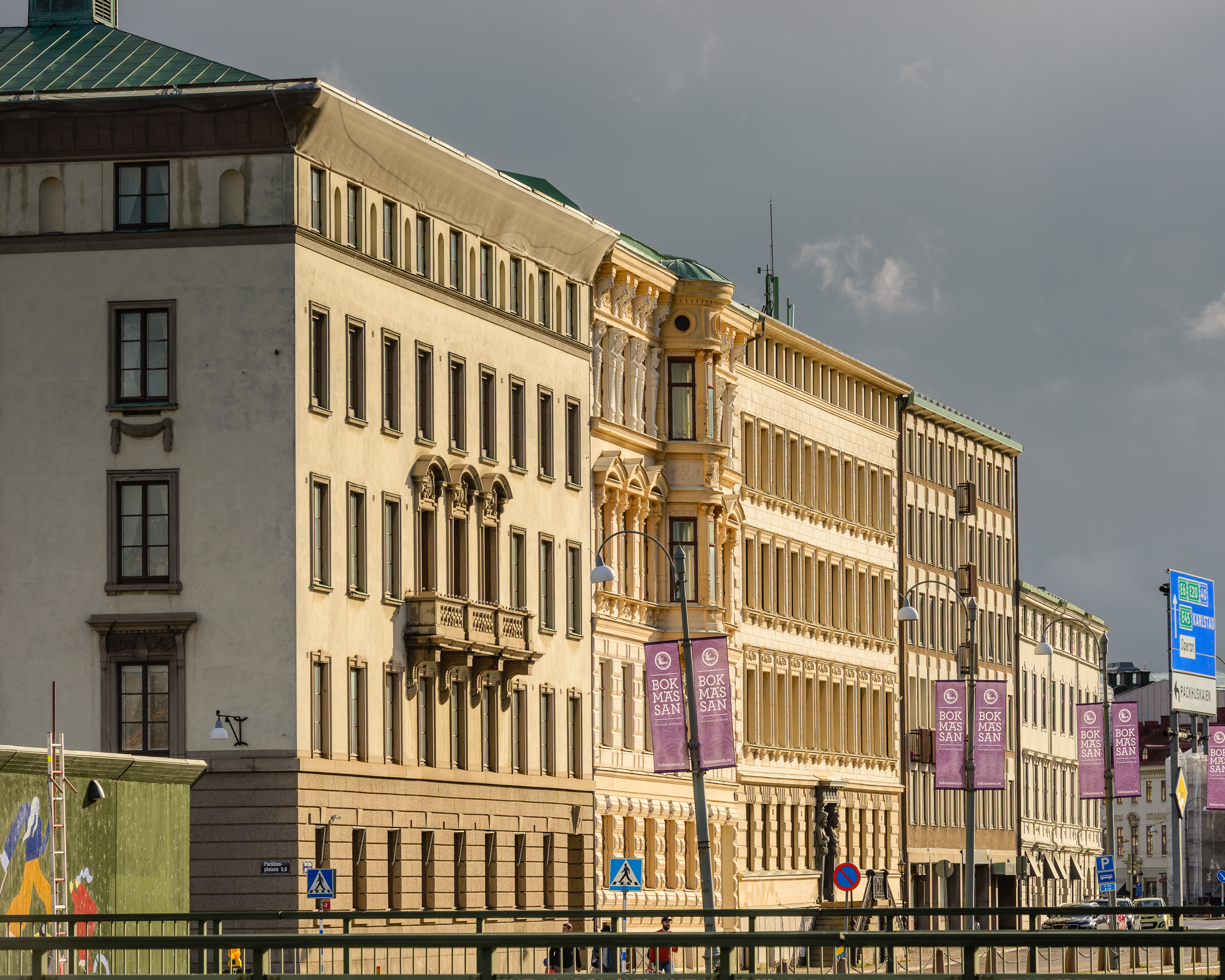
The facades of Gamla Tullen on Norra Hamngatan.

=== Current blocks ===
Nordstaden consists of 30 city blocks. The names used come from 1923, when the original numbers of the blocks were replaced with a modern block name system. The blocks 37 and 38 were built later.

The blocks are: 2 Hövågen, 8 Köpmannen, 10 Kronobageriet, 11 Rådhuset, 12 Ostindiska Kompaniet, 13 Gamla Tullen, 14 Lilla Berget, 15 Traktören, 16 Högvakten, 17 Borgaren, 18 Gamla Teatern, 19 Kronhuset, 20 Franska Tomten, 21 Kruthuset, 22 Vadman, 23 Enigheten, 24 Polismästaren, 25 Göta Kanal, 26 Vindragaren, 27 Stadskvarnen, 28 Navigationsskolan, 29 Kvarnberget, 30 Mjölnaren, 31 Mätaren, 32 Ljusstöparen, 33 Lilla Bommen, 35 Magasinet, 36 Packhuset, 37 Dirigenten, 38 Kajkskjulet.

=== Former blocks ===
Until the 1970s there used to be additional block in Östra Nordstaden: 1 Gustavus Primus, 3 Klädpressaren, 4 Strykjärnet, 5 Tenngjutaren and 6 Nålmakaren as well as 7 Gästgivaren. The buildings in block 9 Nye Port (now known as Drottningtorget) remain, but the block name is no longer in use.

== Sources ==
=== Online sources ===
- Göteborg inom vallarna år 1807, 1872 och 1945, edited by Joel Holger and published in Västanbladet 2004-2005, GöteborgsRegionens Släktforskare.

=== Bibliography ===
- Baum, Greta (2001). Göteborgs gatunamn 1621 t o m 2000. Göteborg: Tre böcker. Libris 8369492. ISBN 91-7029-460-7, p. 10.
- Förteckning över av magistraten den 15 juni 1923 fastställda beteckningar å byggnadskvarter och tomter inom Göteborgs stad. Göteborg: Lindgren & söner. 1923. Libris 1472782
- Kjellin, Maja; Bothén Anders (1973). Östra Nordstaden i Göteborg: en stadsdels historia från grundläggningen till nuvarande tid. Göteborg förr och nu, 0348-2189; 8. Göteborg. Libris 904762
- Lönnroth Gudrun, ed. (2003). Hus för hus i Göteborgs stadskärna. Göteborg: Stadsbyggnadskontoret. Libris 9326427. ISBN 91-89088-12-3, p. 7.
- Stadsbor i gångna tider: släktforskaren och staden. Årsbok / Sveriges släktforskarförbund, 99-0786668-7; 1989 Släkthistoriskt forum, 0280-3984; 89:5. Bromma: Sveriges släktforskarförb. 1989. Libris 7765970. ISBN 91-87676-03-6, pp. 147–164.
- Statistisk årsbok för Göteborg. Göteborgs statistik, 99-0875351-7. Göteborg: Göteborgs stadskansli. 1902-. Libris 8203449
