= Kronhuset =

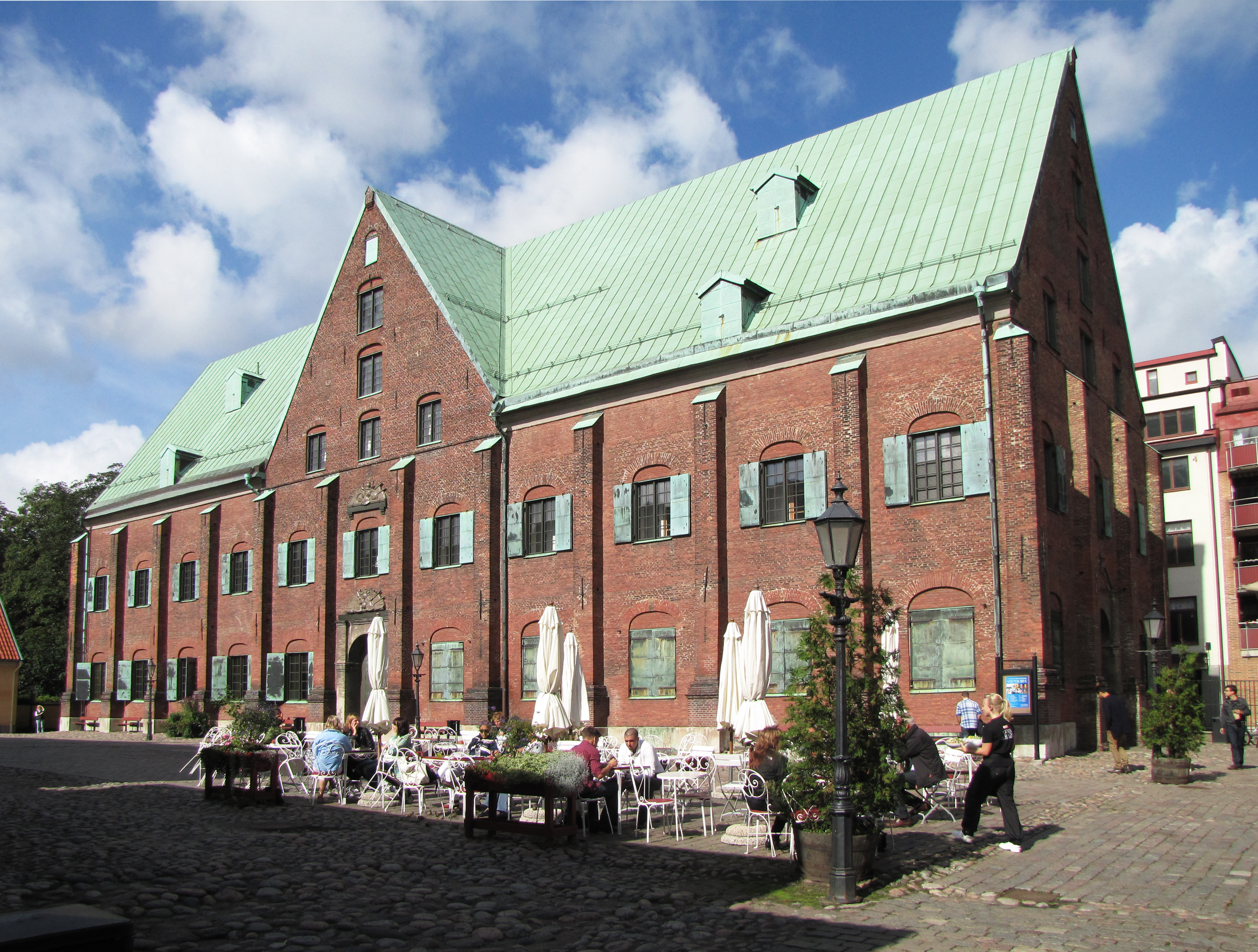
- Interactive map of the Kronhuset area

General information
- Architectural style: Dutch
- Classification: Arsenal, Granary, Chapel, Museum
- Location: Gothenburg, Sweden, Kronhusgatan 1D; 411 13 Göteborg; Västra Götalands län
- Coordinates: 57°42′28″N 11°57′49″E
- Construction started: 1643
- Completed: 1654
- Owner: Gothenburg Municipality, managed by Higab

Technical details
- Material: Brick

Design and construction
- Architect: Simon de la Vallée

Website
- 21400000231338, Riksantikvarieämbetet.

Kronhuset ('the Crown House' in English), formerly known as Giötheborgz Tyghuhs ('Gothenburg's Arsenal'), is a redbrick building in Västra Nordstaden in Gothenburg. It was constructed during the years 1643–1654 in a Dutch style, and is Gothenburg's joint-oldest secular building along with the Torstenson Palace (constructed 1648–1650). The royal architect Simon de la Vallée is believed to have designed the building. The Kronhus was originally used as an arsenal for the city garrison and as a granary to store food reserves so that the city could survive a siege. On December 9, 1927, the ownership of Kronhuset passed from the Swedish state to Gothenburg Municipality. It has been a byggnadsminne, a listed building, since 24 October 1968.

== History ==
After the foundation of Gothenburg in 1621, the cannons and other equipment required for the defence of the city were initially kept in storehouses built into the bastions of the municipal fortifications, but it soon became clear that these were not of sufficient capacity. The decision to build an additional military storehouse was made in February 1640, and in May 1642 the order was issued to begin construction as soon as the ordered brick from Holland had arrived. The construction work was led by the garrison commander Olof Hansson Swart, later knighted Örnehufvud, who also happened to be the son of the mayor of Lödöse.

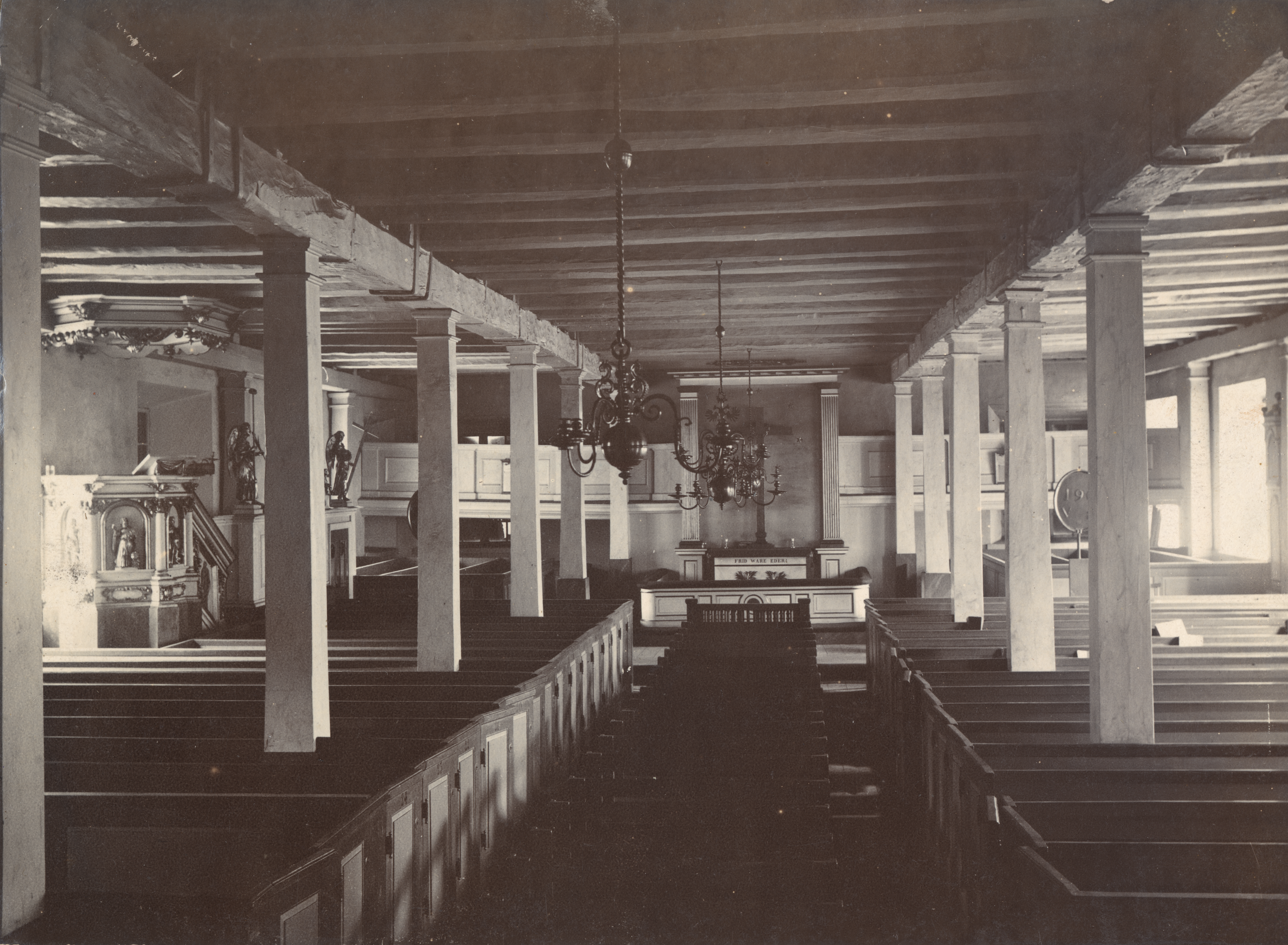
The garrison chapel within the Kronhus, 1888

By 1643 the Kronhus had been built to a height of one storey, but at that point construction was halted due to lack of money. The work resumed around 1648, this time using Swedish bricks rather than imported Dutch ones, and with Johan Wärnschiöldh, the Quartermaster-General of the Swedish Army, taking personal charge of the project. The building was finally completed in 1654.

The Riksdag of the Estates (Swedish Parliament) was convened in Gothenburg on 4 January 1660 by King Karl X Gustav, and the Kronhus was used as a venue for the assembly. The building thus acquired the distinction of serving as the kingdom's parliament house, and the large room on the ground floor has been known as the Rikssal ('National Hall') ever since. Karl Gustav died suddenly in the Torstensson Palace on 13 February, and the then four-year-old Crown Prince Karl was proclaimed King of Sweden on 1 March by the Riksdag.

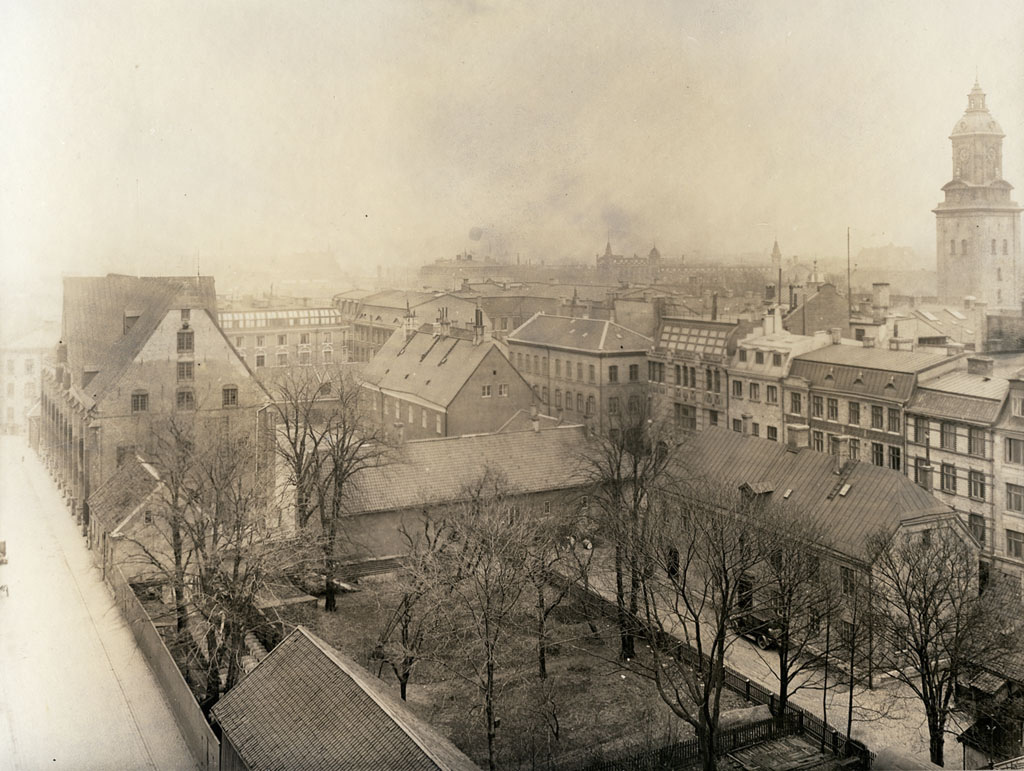
The Kronhus Quarter, 1928.

In 1669 the Gothenburg German Church burned down, and the congregation was permitted to hold services in the Rikssal until the German Church was rebuilt in 1672. In 1680, the bottom floor of Kronhuset was again transformed into a church, this time on a permanent basis in order to act as a chapel for the garrison, which was recognised soon afterward by the Church of Sweden as an independent congregation with the name of 'Garrison Parish'. In 1895, the First Göta Artillery Regiment moved to newly built barracks in Kviberg, and the Second Göta Artillery Regiment moved to Jönköping in 1898, thus dissolving the Gothenburg garrison altogether and making the chapel redundant. The last service was held in the chapel on 25 March 1898, but the Garrison Parish was not abolished until 1927.

In that same year of 1927, the Kronhus was sold by the Swedish state to Gothenburg Municipality, which initially used it as a general-purpose storehouse. However, after the Second World War it was decided to restore the historic building and turn it into a museum. The restoration work lasted three years (1954-7), and the Kronhus was officially reopened by King Gustav VI Adolf on 17 May 1957. The restoration cost one million kronor and was paid for by private donations.

From 1957 to 1996, the ground floor of Kronhuset housed the Gothenburg City Museum. To commemorate the 300th anniversary of Karl X's death, the Museum held an exhibition in the Kronhus in February 1960, displaying various artefacts related to the king's death, including contemporary pamphlets from Sweden, Germany and the Netherlands, and a model of the house in Gothenburg that Per Brahe the Younger and Beata de la Gardie owned and used as their private hospital during the 1660 Riksdag. The museum has since relocated to the former Swedish East India Company headquarters at Norra Hamngatan 12.

The Gothenburg Wind Orchestra was based at the Kronhus from 1997 to 2020.

== The Building ==
The outer dimensions of the house are 80 cubits (47.2 meters) by 24 cubits (14.2 meters). The construction has a Dutch influence, in that the Rikssal, which comprises the bottom floor, has no load-bearing pillars at all. The roof of the lower floor, as well as all the joists lying on top of it, hang in the roof truss structure, which in turn rests on and in the masonry. This is therefore reinforced with 28 "contreforts" or pillars, 12 on each long side and 2 on each gable. However, as early as the 1670s, pillars were installed to support the roof, which were removed in connection with a major renovation in the 1950s when 12 of the old roof beams were replaced with iron beams. The Flemish tapestry, woven in Brussels around 1690, was donated at the rededication of director Osvald Arnulf-Olsson.

In the 18th century walled some windows were rebuilt and the others were fitted with shutters. In the 19th century, a couple of wooden emblems were erected on the south side of the house, which most likely came from the demolished Kungsporten.

== Kronhusbodarna ==
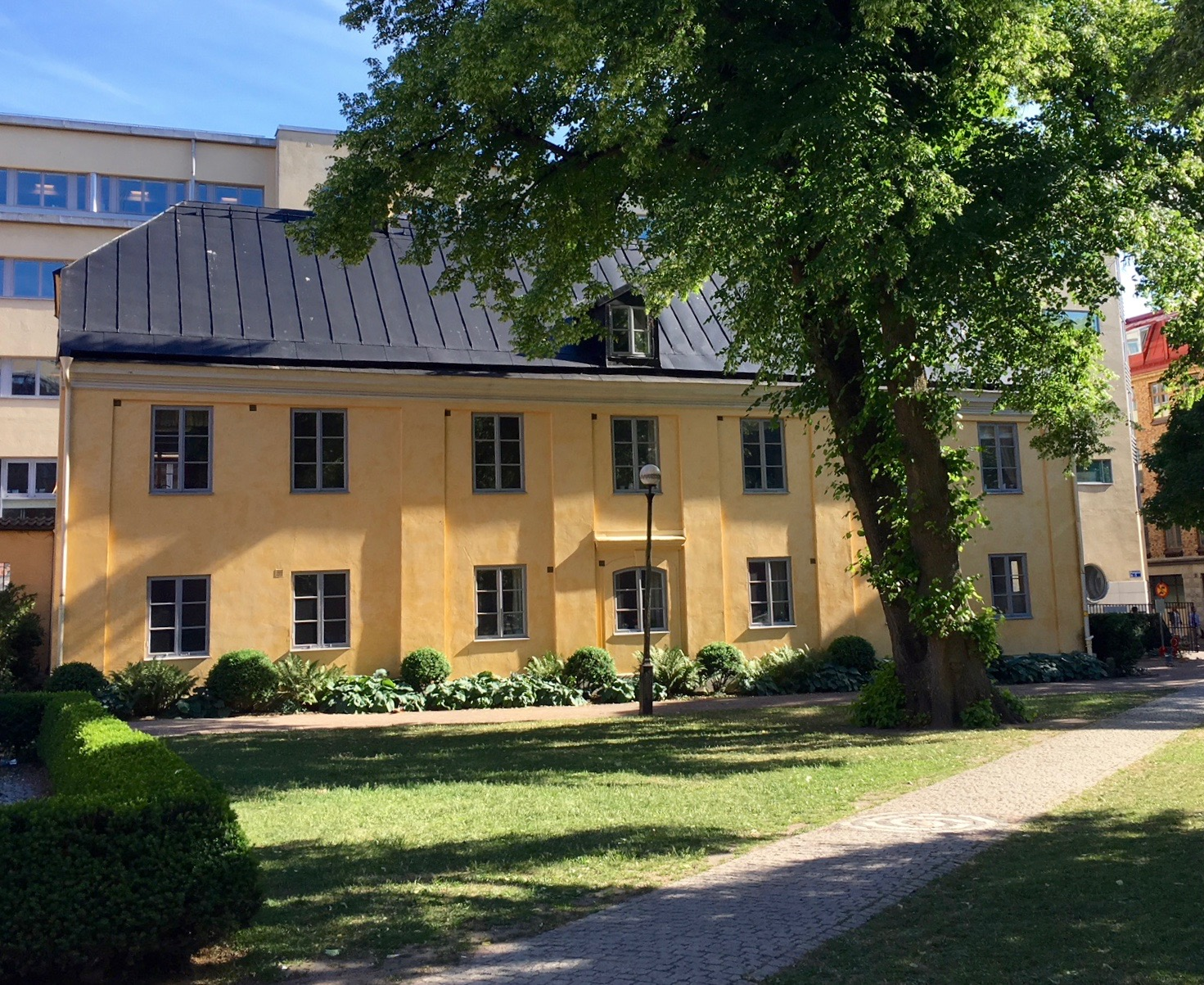
Kronhusparken with one of the 'Kronhus sheds' behind

Kronhusbodarna ('the Crown House sheds') are a collection of eighteenth-century buildings, all painted bright yellow, which ring the courtyard in front of the Kronhus. They have also been recognised as listed buildings since 24 October 1968.

The eastern Kronhus sheds were built in 1756-59 and at that time there was a smithy, wheelwright and workshop there, while the western Kronhus sheds were built 1764–69 and in the nineteenth century were used as a storehouse for railway equipment. The sheds were restored and reopened to private tenants in 1971. Current tenants include shops selling pottery, glassware, leather products and interior furnishings, as well as a watchmaker and a cafe. An annual arts and crafts market has been held in the courtyard in front of the sheds since the early 2000s.

== Kronhusparken ==
Kronhusparken is a small park at the back of Kronhusbodarna, laid out in 1930 and renovated in 1964 after the city acquired the property. The park covers about 2000 square meters. In the park stands a bust of the poet Johan Anders Wadman, who lived in Gothenburg 1814–1838, sculpted by Johan Peter Molin.

== Sources ==
=== Websites ===
- Kronhuset, map from Lantmäteriet. Accessed 7 July 2014.
- Kronhuset, Bebyggelseregistret, Riksantikvarieämbetet. Accessed 7 July 2014.
- Kronhusbodarna, Bebyggelseregistret, Riksantikvarieämbetet. Accessed 5 November 2016.
- Kontorshus, Postgatan 4, Kronhuset, Bebyggelseregistret, Riksantikvarieämbetet. Accessed 9 December 2016.
- Lagskydd, Kontorshus, Postgatan 4, Kvarteret Kronhuset,] Bebyggelseregistret, Riksantikvarieämbetet. Accessed 9 December 2016.

=== Written Sources ===
- 100 utmärkta hus i Göteborg. [Arkitekten och staden]; [3]. Göteborg: Manne Ekman & Margareta Rydbo, Göteborgs stadsmuseum i samarbete med Göteborgs-posten. 2001. pp. 24–27. ISBN 91-85488-54-2.
- Mattsson, Britt-Marie (1992). Franks Jeremy, Nagel Hillevi (ed.). Parkernas Göteborg. Göteborg: AB Långedrag. p. 34. ISBN 91-630-1016-X.
- Göteborg, Sven Schånberg 1981
- Göteborg berättar, Bengt A. Öhnander 1991
- Göteborg före grävskoporna, Robert Garellick 1997
