= Franska Tomten =

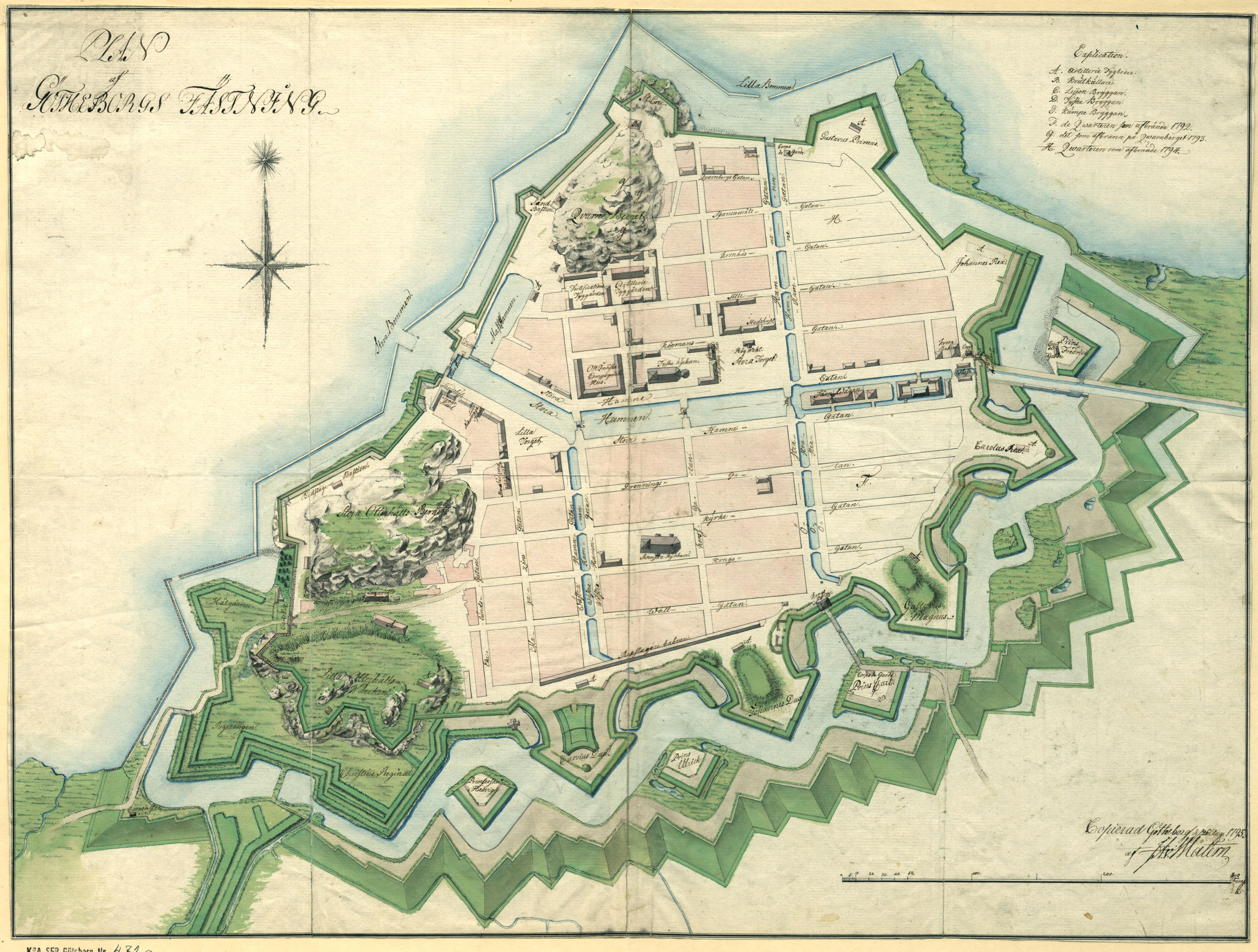
Map of Gothenburg from 1795. The French plot was adjacent to the Masthamnen which is seen on the left by the Stora Bommen and the Harbor Canal.

The Franska Tomten (Swedish: French Plot) is a block located at the Packhusplatsen square in the Nordstaden central district of Gothenburg, Sweden.

== History ==
The Franska Tomten was a plot of land located at the Port of Gothenburg that was controlled by the French government. A 1772 trade deal between the French and Swedish governments allowed the French to have trading rights at the Port of Gothenburg; in exchange, the Swedish were given ownership of the Caribbean island of Saint Barthélemy. The major economic activity in Saint Barthélemy was the trans-Atlantic slave trade. The Swedes continued to govern Saint Barthélemy as a hub of the Swedish slave trade until slavery was abolished in Sweden's colonies in 1847. In 1878, the island was sold back to the French.

== See also ==
- Slavery in France
- Swedish slave trade
