= Stock Exchange building =

Stock Exchange building can refer to the:

- Gothenburg City Hall
- Chicago Stock Exchange Building
- New York Stock Exchange Building
- Stock Exchange Tower in London
- Stockholm Stock Exchange Building
- Palais de la Bourse (Marseille)
