= Stadsgården =

Wharf on the Baltic Sea in Stockholm

Coordinates: 59°19′10.38″N 18°4′29.86″E

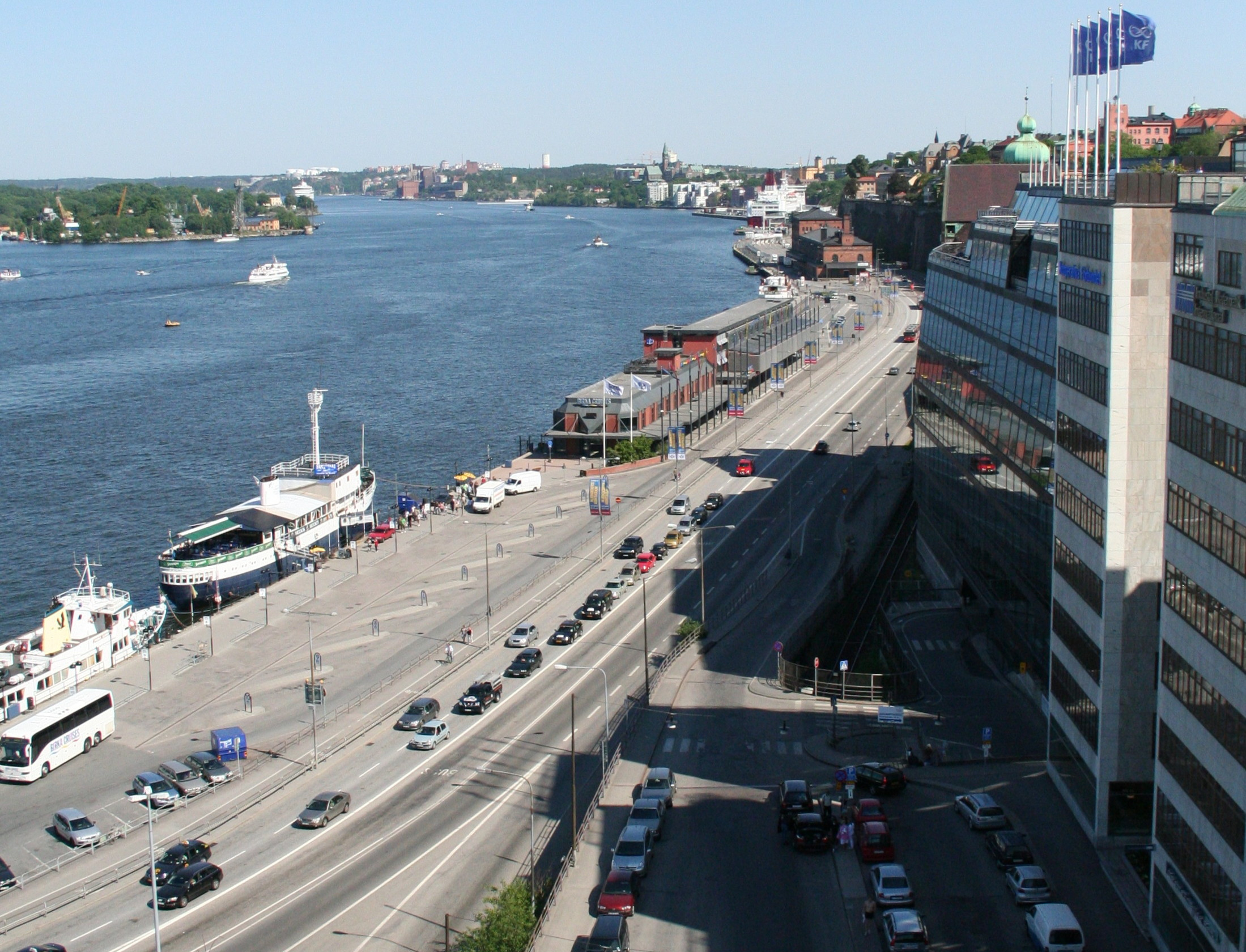
Stadsgården in 2007.

Stadsgården commonly refers to the wharf on the shore of the Baltic Sea in Stockholm, Sweden, located between Slussen in the west and Masthamnen in the east. The word gård in the name comes from skeppsgård, which was a word used in archaic Swedish for an area used for port and dock operations.

== History ==
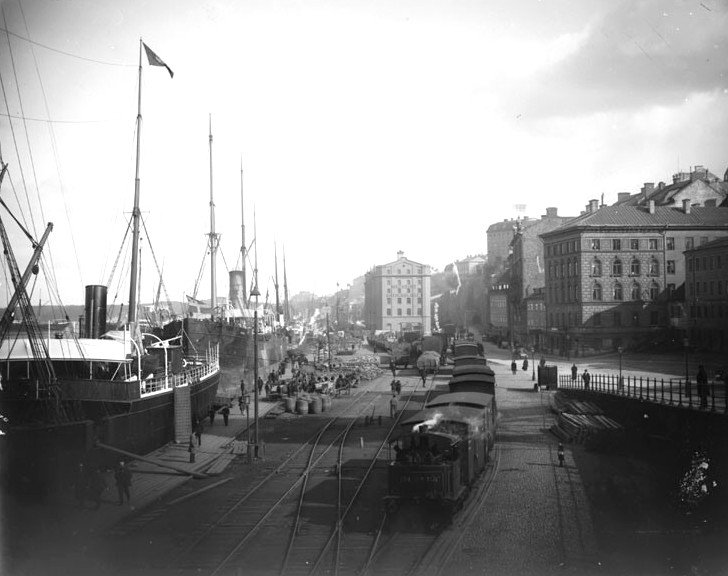
Stadsgården in 1896.

Stadsgården (Stadens skeppgård) originally constituted only the western, broader part of the shore, near to a steep cliff face on Fjällgatan. The name is credited to have first occurred in 1448, in a text mentioning "en tompt vppa sudra malm belegna vidh Stadz garden". At least from the early 14th century, so called "tran boats" or "seal boats" lay fastened to poles on the water around the area. In the boats, seal fat from the Stockholm archipelago and the Bothnian Sea was cooked, and the resulting whale oil from this smelly contraption was packed in cans and sold further. The boats were left until the start of the 17th century.

A certain building, containing stables, was prominent in the area. In Stockholm's privilege letter from 1594, proposals to tear down this building to give place for ship construction docks were mentioned:

"Så skall och stadzgården på Södre malmen lydhe och liggie under stadhen, såsom af ålder varidt hafwer, och aldelis blifve fri och opbygd, på thet rum måtte vare att brådhe och byggie skipp ther sammestädz. The bygninger, som ther nu opsatte äre emoth stadzens och borgerskapetz vilie, måghe bortrifves."
"So should also the Stadsgården in Södermalm lay under the city, where there previously has been sea, and thoroughly be free and built, and there should be room to build ships there. The buildings that now stand there, against the will of the city and its inhabitants, must be dismantled."

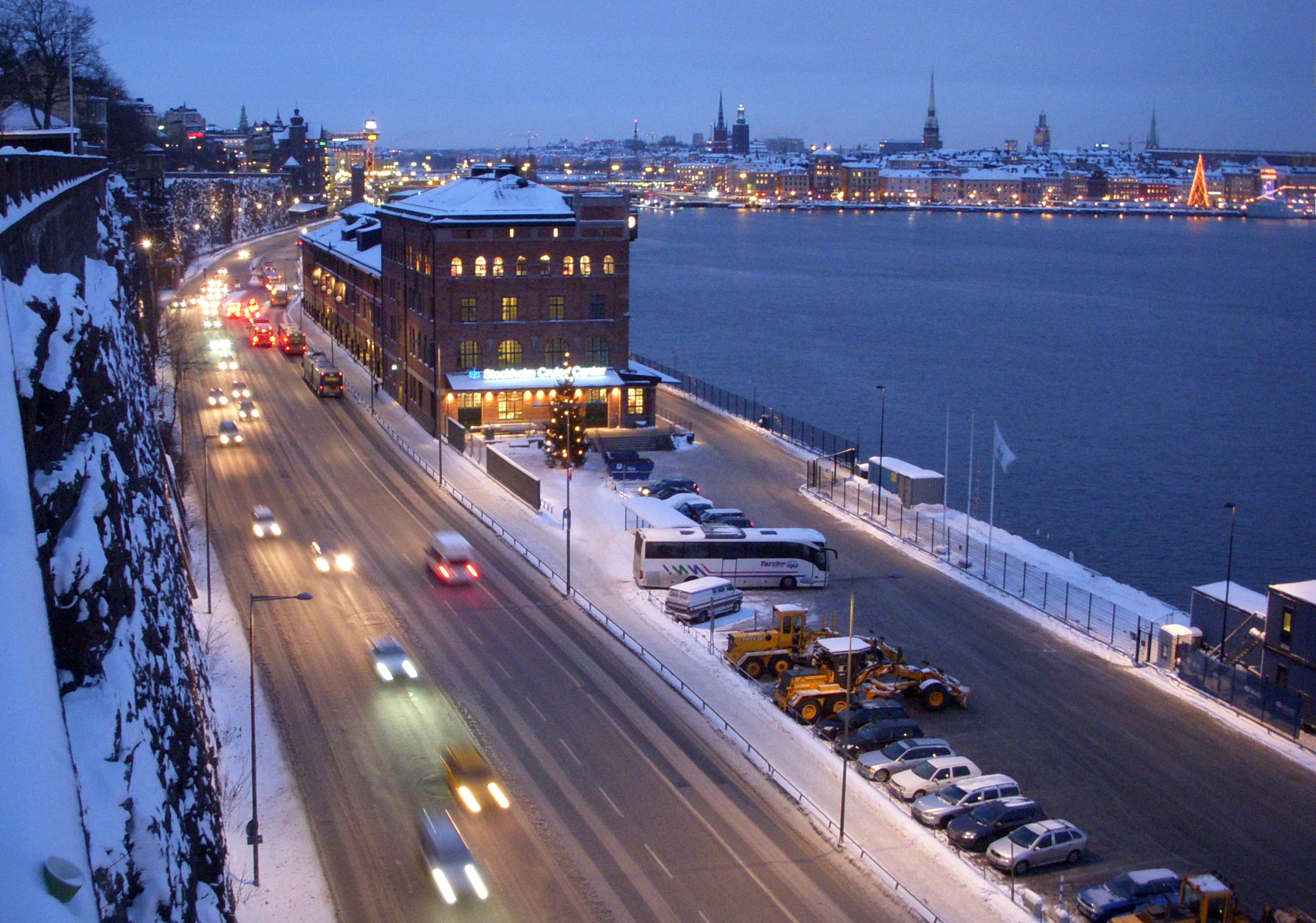
Stadsgårdleden Road to the west, with the Greater customs building (Stora Tullhuset) and Old Town in the background, in December 2010.

Ship construction on the area was probably started in 1687 when the Södra varvet in Tegelviken was founded. In the Karta öfver S:ta Catharina församling from 1674, a long row of narrow lots towards Saltsjön is visible, but no road connecting them. On the map, Tegelvik remains a bay, bearing the name Skjeps-hwarfwet. In the 17th and 18th centuries, the name Skeppsbron, or Nya Skeppsbron, is also mentioned, relating to Skeppsbron in Gamla stan.

In an attempt by city architect Johan Eberhard to improve the Stadsgården docks in the end of the 1730s, a long wooden wharf was built. From the wharf, hay, wheat, wood and coal were distributed to be transported across the sea. In wintertime, the wharf was used by many vinterliggarna.

Work to replace the wooden wharf by a stone construction proceeded very slowly because of the great depth of water. From 1875 to 1882, a new wooden wharf was built instead, resting on three rows of poles, with a length of 528 metres. Railway tracks were laid down on the wharf and connected with the Sammanbindningsbanan in Stockholm and the Skeppsbro wharf track. A magazine was built in 1883, and from 1888 to 1889 the Lilla Tullhuset was built. During the name revision in 1885, the name for the area between Slussen and Tegelviksplan was established as Stadsgården, having previously (1849) been called Stadsgårdhamnen.

In the late 19th century, a railway track, Saltsjöbanan, was built and completed on 1 July 1893. The Stadsgården railway station was in use from 23 December 1893 to 21 December 1936, when it was moved to Slussen. The station building, dating from 1914, was sold to Stockholm's Christian Seaman Care, and the building became known as Sjömansinstitutes hus.

Work between 1911 and 1915 replaced the old wooden wharf with a granite-enforced concrete wharf, which was 12 metres longer than the old wharf. At the same time, the sea bed around the wharf was scooped.

== Stadsgårdleden and Stadsgårdhamnen ==
The traffic way Stadsgårdleden was named in 1986 and replaced a large part of the older traffic way. The traffic way is about 1.3 km long, and the way from Söder Mälarstrand passes by Södra Järngraven, Saltsjörampen, Franska bukten, Stadsgårdhamnen, Katarinabergen and Tegelviksslingan. The major attraction in the west is the Katarina Elevator and in the east, the cliff with Fåfängan on its top. Stadsgårdhissen is located halfway between Slussen and Tegelviksplan, and from there, the 638-metre Stadsgårdtunneln, located on the Saltsjöbanan railway track, begins. Today, "Stadsgården" refers to the 300-metre road part connection Östra Slussgatan with Stadsgårdleden. Along "Stadsgårdhamnen", the Stockholm city wharves can be found, with terminals for cruise ferries and ferries to Finland, including the Viking Line terminal.

In the 21st century, parts of the customs and port buildings at Stadsgården have been adapted for cultural use. The former customs building, (Stora Tullhuset), now houses Fotografiska, which operates an exhibition venue dedicated to photography and visual culture.

== Stadsgårdhamnen on a summer day in 2007 ==
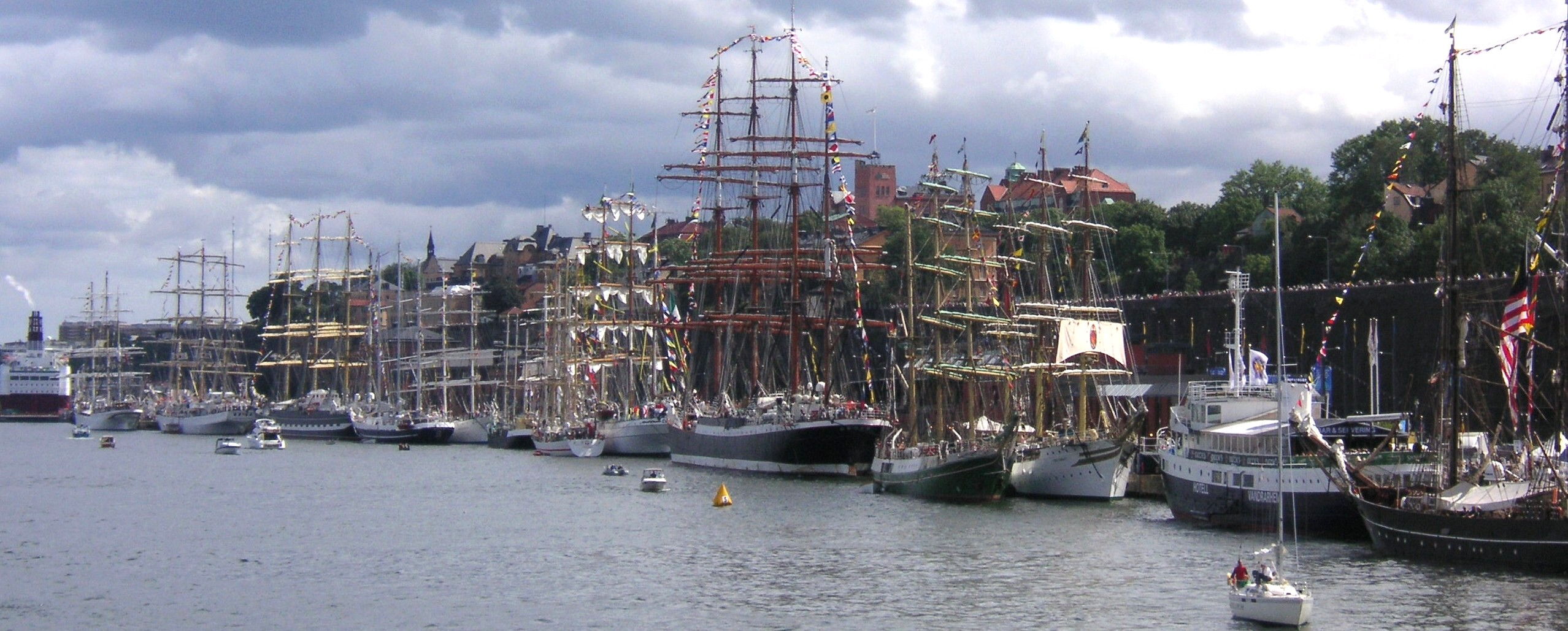
Stadsgårdhamnen during "The Tall Ships' Races" on 28 July 2007 can give an impression about how the wharf looked like in the 18th century.

== Sources ==
- Kerstin Söderlund & Marcus Hjulhammar: Slussen: Arkeologisk utredning 2007, Stockholm city museum, department of cultural milieu
