= Nordstan =

Shopping mall in Gothenburg, Sweden

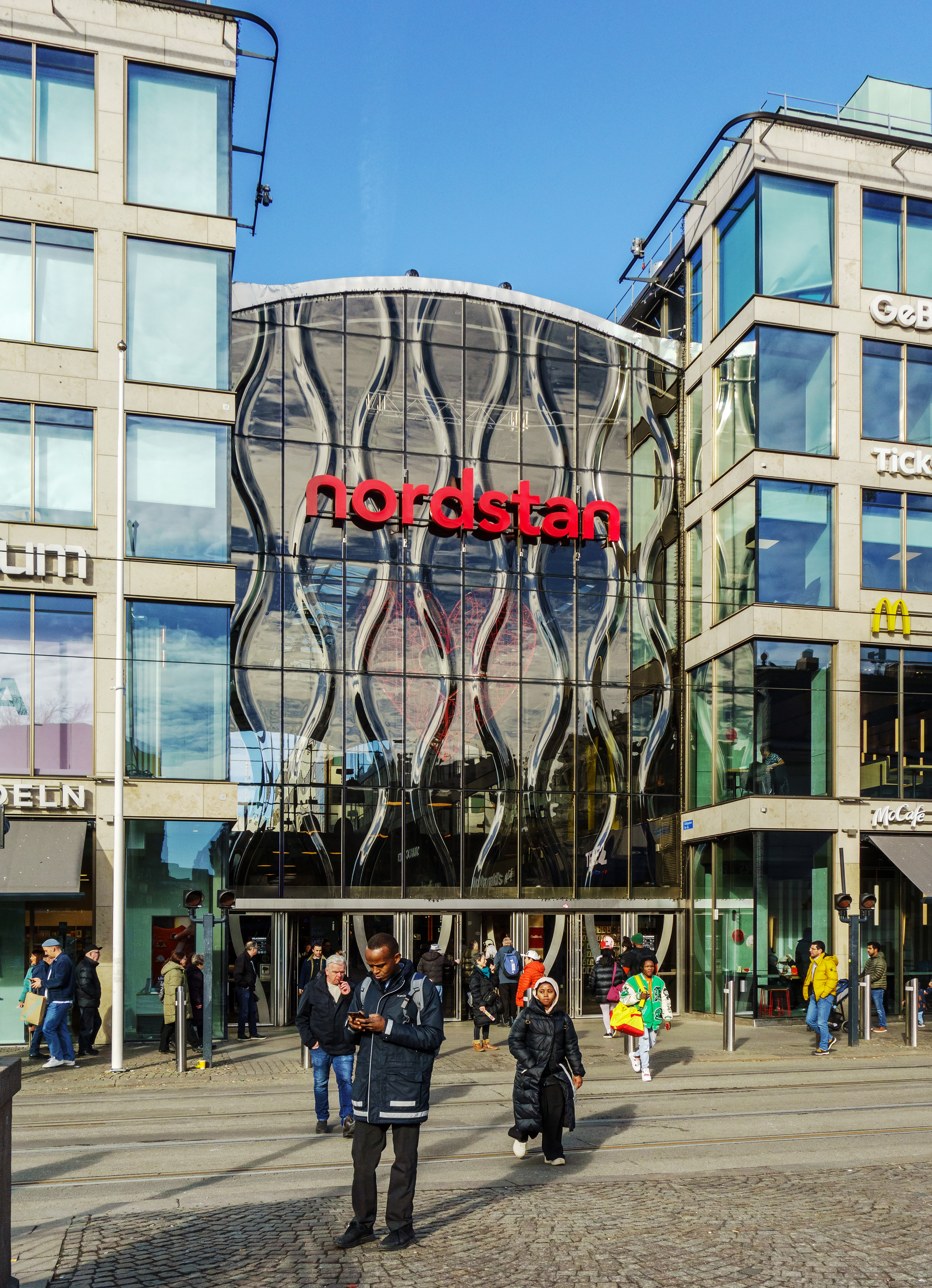
- The main entrance to Nordstan from Brunnsparken
- Location: Gothenburg, Sweden
- Coordinates: 57°42′30″N 11°58′9″E
- Owner: AMF Pension Nordstans Samfällighetsförening; Vasakronan; Hufvudstaden; Eklandia; F O Peterson Söner Byggnads
- Num. of stores: 179
- Floor area: 70,000 m^{2} (750,000 sq ft)
- Floors: 4
- Parking: 2,700
- Public transit: Gothenburg Central Station; Nils Ericson Terminal
- Website: nordstan.se

Nordstan is a shopping center in Gothenburg, Sweden. It is the largest shopping centre in Sweden in terms of revenue, and with approximately 180 shops and 150 offices. The shopping centre's total area is about 320,000 m^{2} (3,400,000 sq ft) divided into nine interconnected buildings, where retail and restaurant floor space makes up around 70,000 m^{2} (750,000 sq ft). The covered streets and squares comprise 8,000 m^{2} (86,000 sq ft). The companies housed in Nordstan employ approximately six thousand people and the total annual turnover was SEK 4.1 billion in 2013. The main passageways in the centre are public spaces and therefore are open for use after shops have closed. The character of the centre changes after closing time of the shops. The presence of adults is drastically reduced and the premises become a hangout for youth.

== History ==
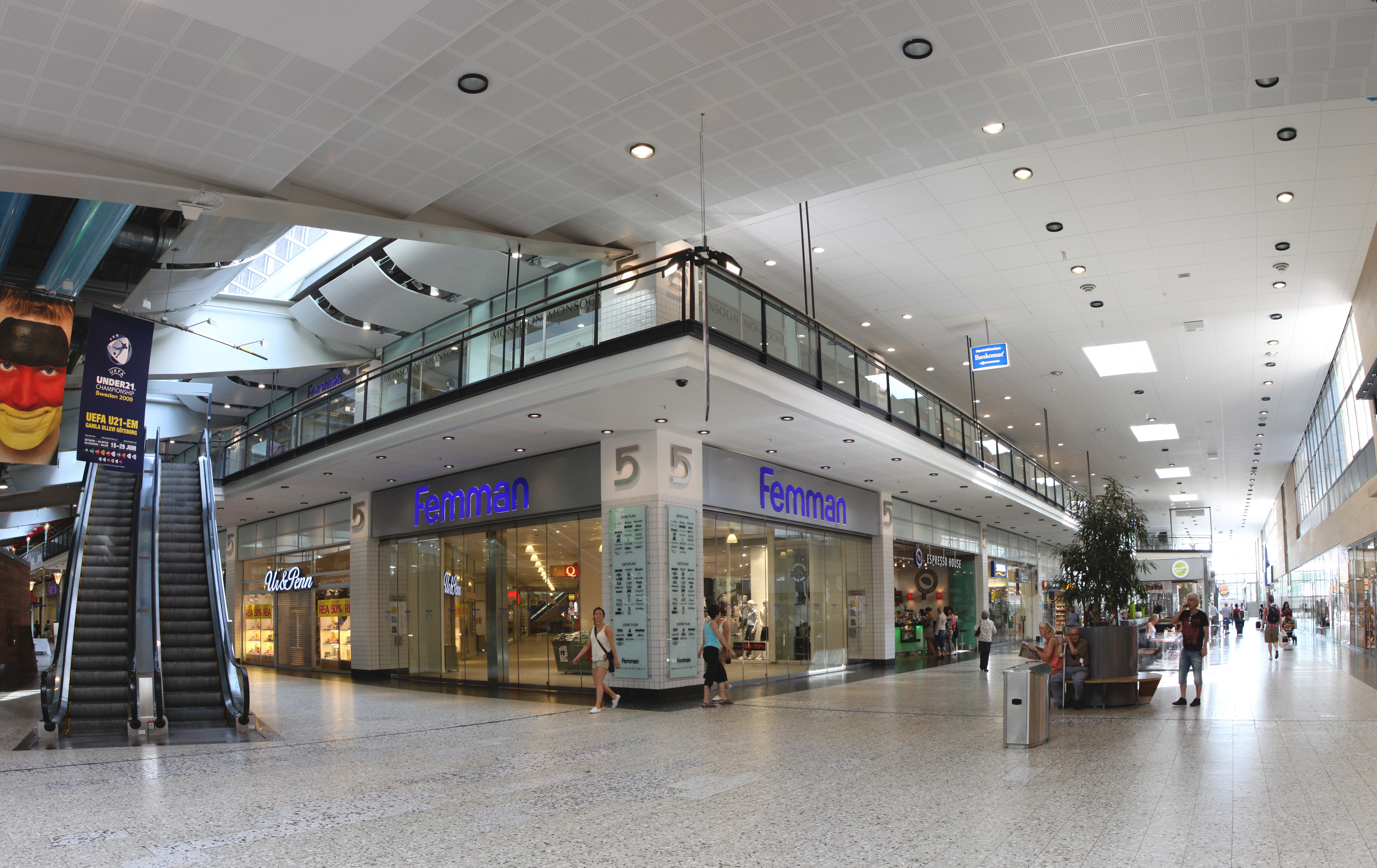
The department store Femman.

During the emigration to America from the 1860s to the 1920s, the area of Nordstan was a lively part of city. Emigrants passed here between the Gothenburg Central Station and the ships waiting at the Port of Gothenburg to the west.

The area where Nordstan is currently located is called Östra Nordstan (Eastern North city), as it was located north of the Great Canal and east of the Östra Hamngatan street, in opposite to Västra Nordstan (Western North city) located west of that street.

However, in the 1960s the area of Östra Nordstaden was neglected and had become a slum. With the help of building companies and banks all of the old city blocks were acquired, with a total of 90 buildings. The construction of the Nordstan shopping centre began in 1967, over a part of the city previously neglected. Östra Nordstan was shortened to Nordstan when the shopping centre was opened. Most of the current Nordstan was finished by 1972. At its time, the construction of the shopping centre was Sweden's largest ever city renovation project. By 2006, Nordstan had gone through a major renovation to make it more attractive.

City blocks and houses were linked together with a common roof. The cost for the renovation rose up to about 2.8 billion Swedish krona (in 2014 money) and was "the largest city renovation in Sweden" at the time. The entire project was organised by private construction companies and many Gothenburgian banks (most prominently by Skandinaviska banken, but also by Svenska Handelsbanken, Sveriges Kreditbank and Göteborgs Bank) and with help from the municipality.

The city's expert in building, Torsten Henrikson, said about the role of the municipality:

From the beginning, the consortium sought contact with the authorities to see whether the city was interested in participating and found out that it was not, because we had such large need for renovation. According to the city, it should take a more mercantile role. But we said that we would leave all participation from the municipality, create a zoning plan for the area, and the decision about the plan was also a political decision.

Ten construction companies of various sizes expressed interest in the project: Gösta Andersson Byggnadsfirma; Byggnads AB Eriksson & Rann; Ernst Järnfelt Byggnads AB; Yngve Kullenberg Byggnads AB; Byggnads AB J. Alfr. Olsson; F O Peterson & Söner Byggnads AB; AB Skånska Cementgjuteriet; Gunnar Zetterberg Byggnads AB; Bygg-Oleba Olle Engkvist AB and Svenska Industribyggen AB. On 21 June 1960 these companies founded the commandit company Östra Nordstaden AB & Co with equal shares. The CEO was the chief of the buildings department in Gothenburg, Frans Persson. The company's own capital was 300 thousand krona. To avoid speculation in building prices, 33 buildings had been invested in April 1961 and a further eight in November in the same year.

The name "Nordstan" comes from the neighbourhood of Nordstaden, whose eastern part the area is located in, at the northern part of the original city area. The shopping centre was originally called Östra Nordstan, but by 1984 the name was shortened to Nordstan. Many of the original street names have been preserved. Nordstanstorget was invented, Norra Larmgatan and Lilla Klädpressaregatan were taken away when the shopping centre was built. Lilla Klädpressaregatan was taken into use again in 1986 when the bottom floor of the parking hall was rebuilt to business use. It is also called Nya Gatan.

On 11 December 1979 rollerskating was forbidden in Nordstadstorget. It had become a larger problem than what had been expected.

From 2008 to 2009 large parts of the shopping centre were renovated. Åhléns opened a fourth floor, and a further 4000 square metres of business space were given available for Elgiganten and Stadium. This cost 60 million krona.

Nordstan was for some time a hangout for street children with foreign backgrounds, from the suburbs of Gothenburg but also migrants from Morocco, Afghanistan and Syria, after the shops close at night. These gangs threatened shop keepers, traded drugs and fought with other gangs in the centre. Many of the unaccompanied minors hanging in the shopping centre have had several asylum applications rejected.

== Location and transportation ==
Nordstan is located in Gothenburg's city centre, connected to the Gothenburg Central Station and the Nils Ericson Terminal by an underground pedestrian tunnel, and to the Lilla Bommen marina and the Gothenburg Opera house by sheltered walkways. The shopping centre also offers parking space to 2,700 cars. Just outside Nordstan are three different tram stops on three sides of the shopping center, making it easy to reach Nordstan by public transportation. A majority of the visitors use public transportation. If almost all of the visitors had used cars (as it is for many shopping centres outside city centres), around 8,000 parking places would be needed and this would need more parking space area than shop area.

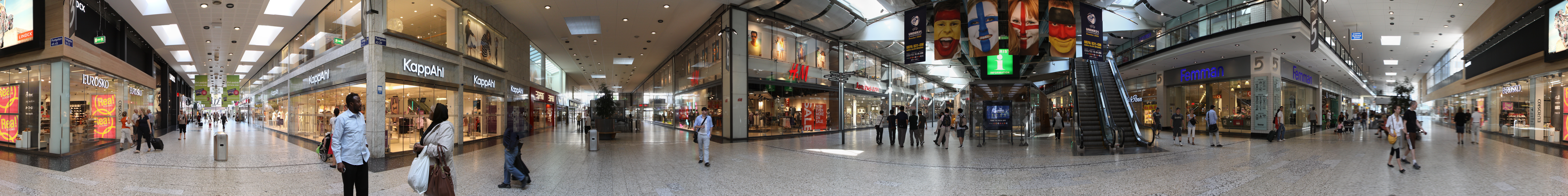
Panorama of Nordstan's interior

== Description ==
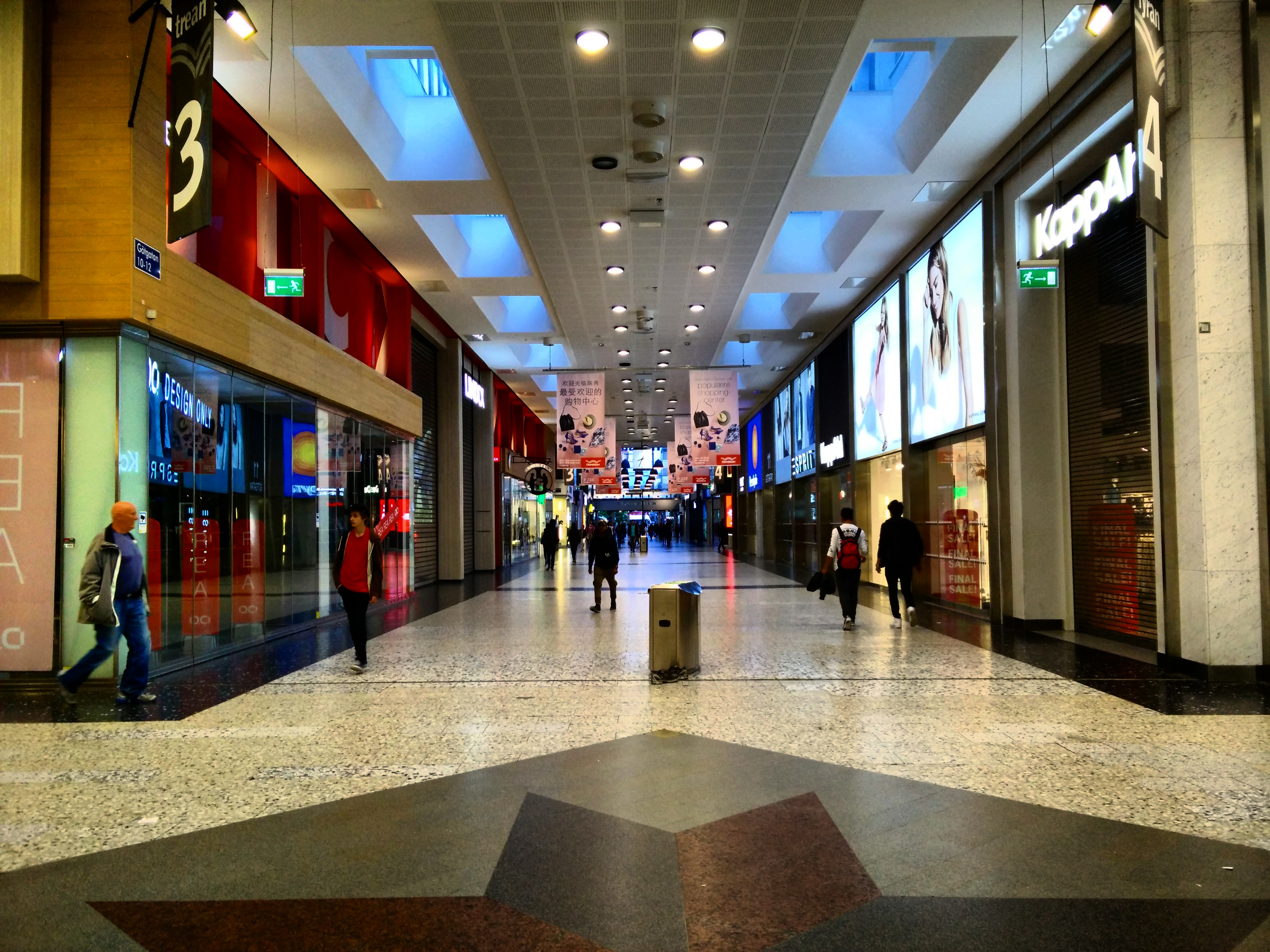
Interior view of Nordstan.

Nordstad is visited by 35 million people annually and has an annual revenue of 4 billion krona (2012). There are about 200 shops and restaurants as well as about 150 offices in the same complex. There are four floors for businesses in the shopping centre.

The Nordstadstorget square is located in the middle of Nordstan, which is a large indoor space used for exhibitions and events. The department store Åhléns (opened on 27 March 1974) and the department store Femman, owned by Hufvudstaden, are located there. Femman consists of three floors of shops and five floors of offices. The shopping centre was opened in nine stages between 1972 and 1985.

Under Christmas season 2004 the rush at the Nordstan parking hall was so great that instead of the normal capacity of 2700 cars, it was visited by 8000 cars per day. Many drivers had to queue for 1.5 hours to get out of the parking hall. The shopping centre had to call its security guards from Securitas to organise the traffic. On the same day in December 2004, the shopping centre was visited by 140 thousand customers.

There are many store chains and their "flagship stores" in Nordstan. MacForum in Nordstan opened in March 2008 with an area of 1600 square metres. It is the second largest Apple store in Europe, after the store in London, United Kingdom. However, the store in Nordstan is just a vendor, not an Apple Store owned by Apple Inc. itself. By terms of sales area, the store is the largest external Apple vendor in the world. Other "flagship stores" include Lindex, which was opened as the company's first Brand Store in Nordstan in 2001, H&M, and the Spanish clothes store Desigual which opened its first store in Nordstan in 2010 with a sales area of 700 square metres.

== Ownership ==
The complex is owned by a consortium of building companies. These include Vasakronan, Hufvudstaden, F O Peterson Söner Byggnads AB, Gösta Andersson Byggnadsfirma AB and Castellum AB, as well as the Nordstan building company.

== See also ==
- List of shopping centres in Sweden
