= Gustaf Adolfs torg, Gothenburg =

Square in Gothenburg, Sweden

Coordinates: 57°42′25.6″N 11°58′0.5″E

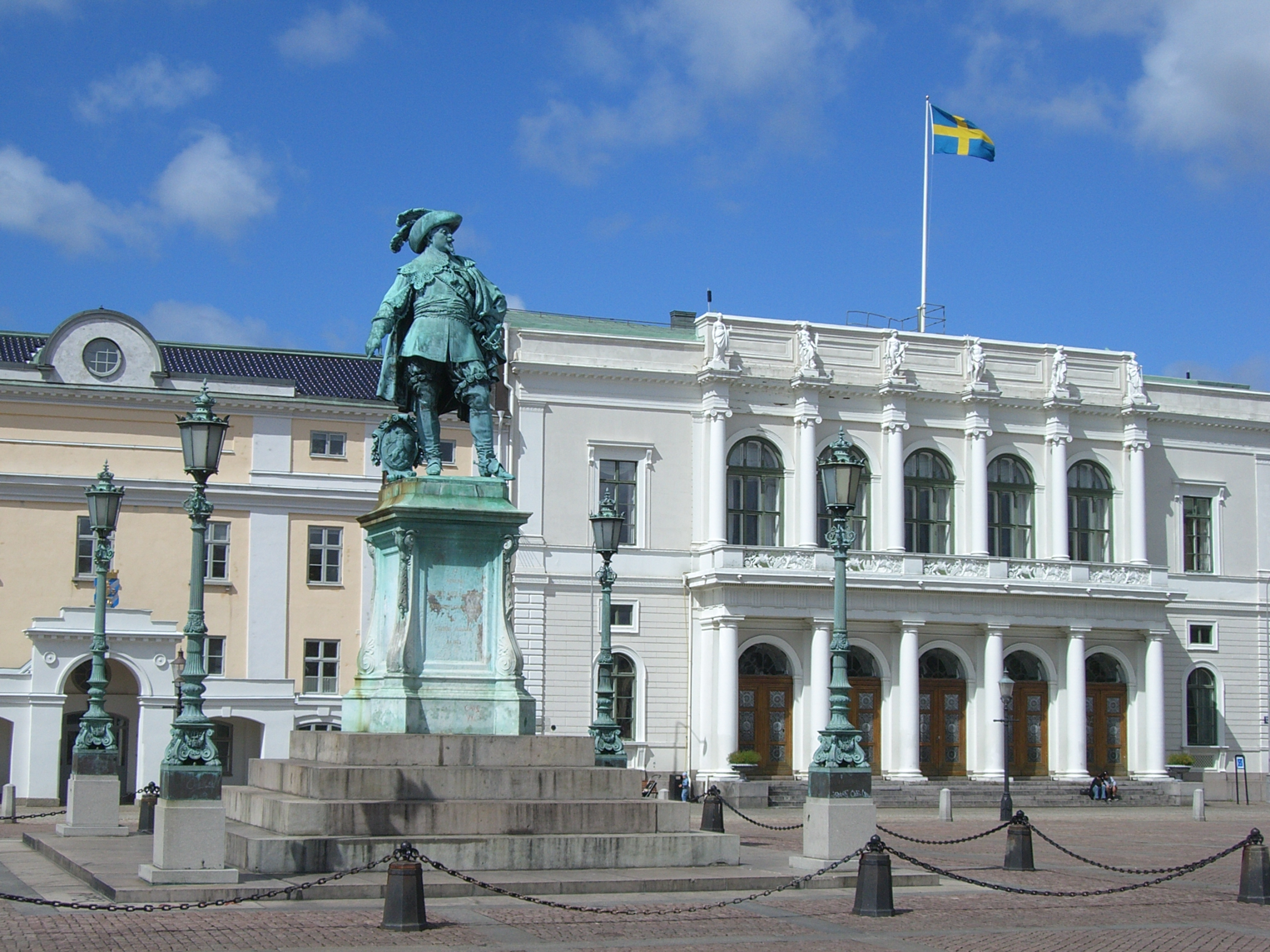
Gustav II Adolf statue, with the bourse in the background

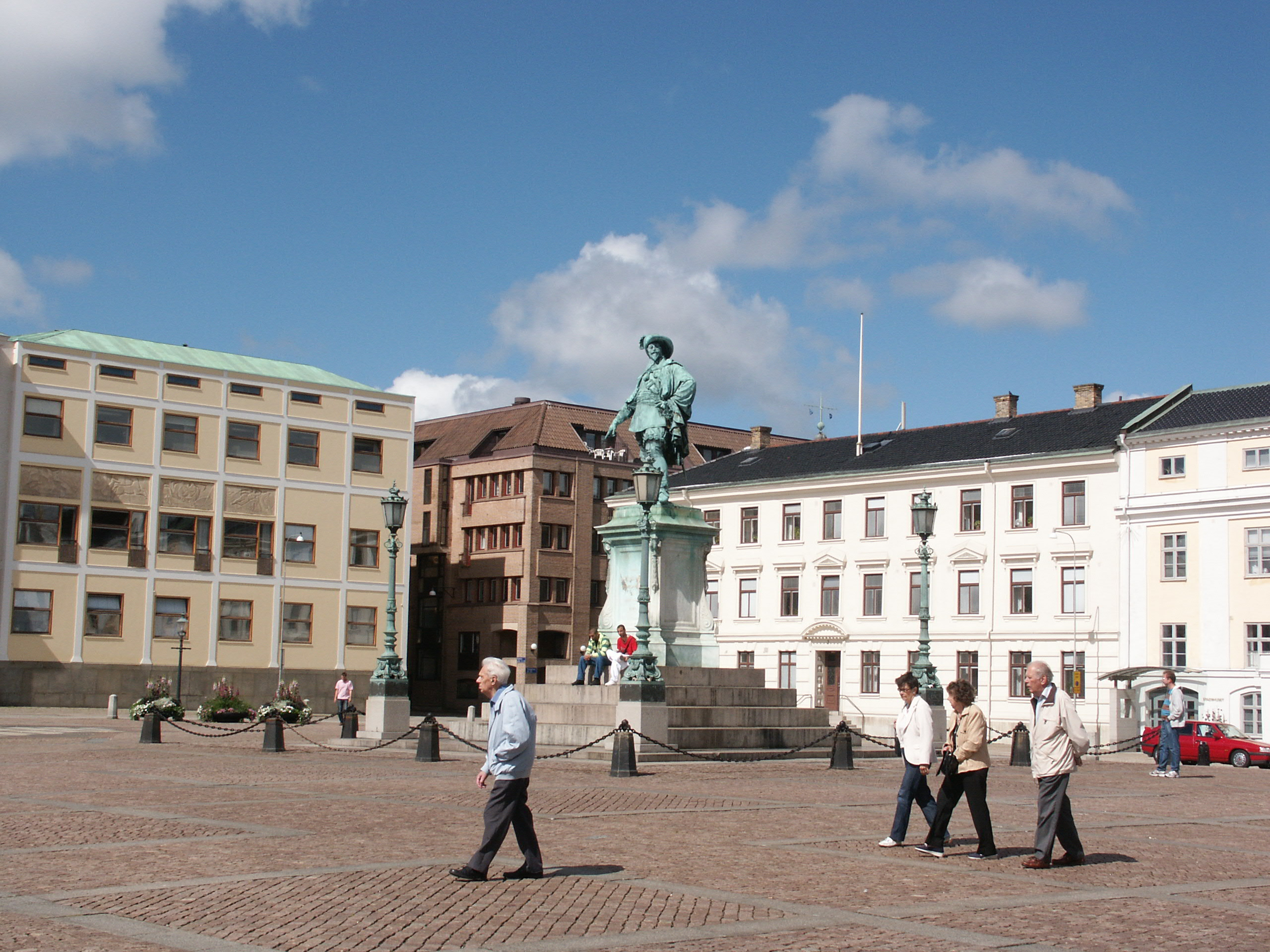
Gustaf Adolf's square with the statue of Gustavus Adolphus of Sweden and Asplund's law court in the background.

Gustaf Adolfs torg ("Gustaf Adolf's square") is a town square located in central Gothenburg, Sweden. It was named Stortorget (the Big Square) until 1854 when a statue of the founding father of Gothenburg, king Gustavus Adolphus of Sweden was raised.

The square is surrounded by the old and new city halls, the bourse, and the main harbour canal of Gothenburg. It hosted the opening of the 10th Gothenburg Fringe Festival.
