= Torstenson Palace =

- Torstensonska Palatset
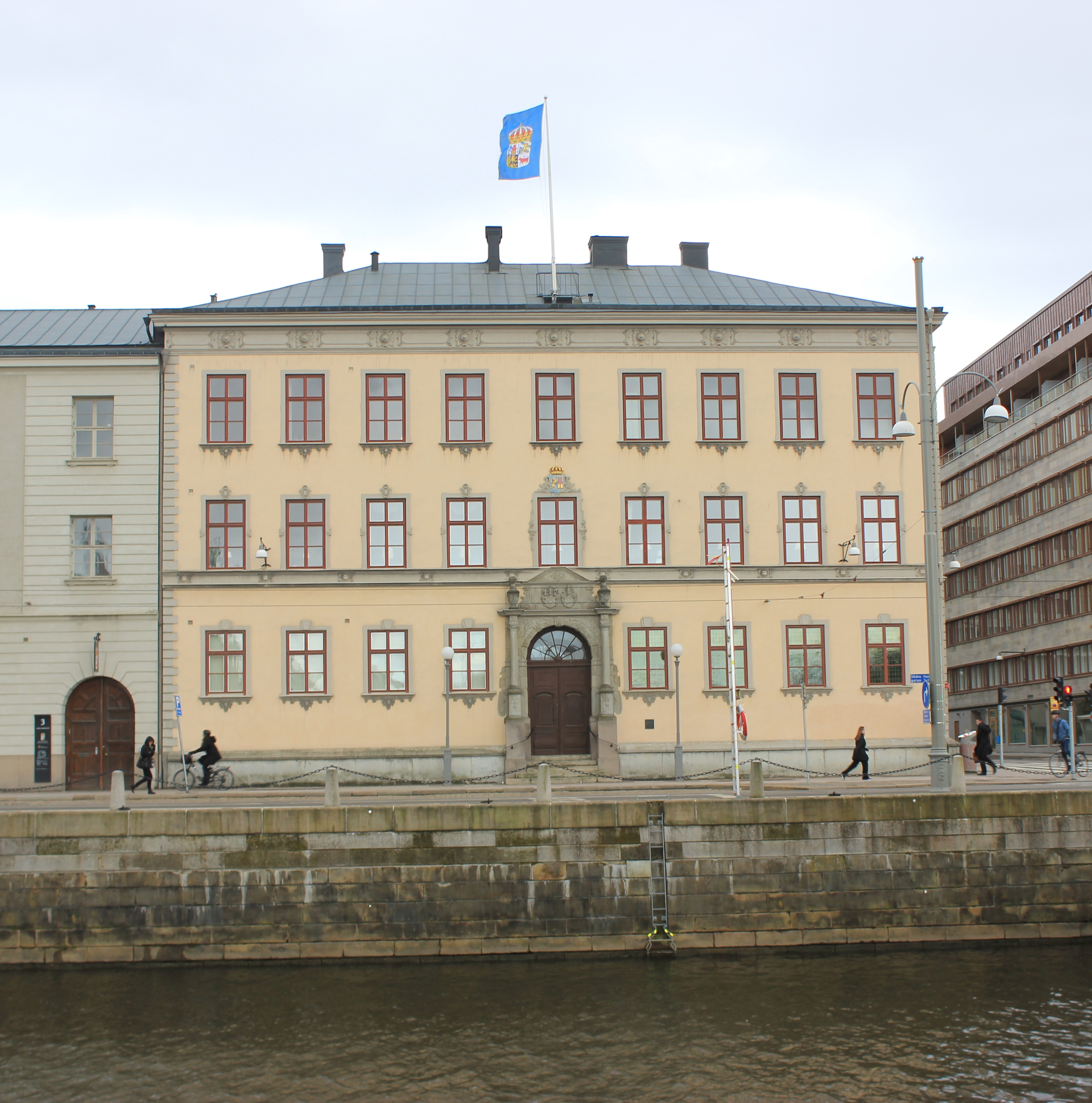
- Interactive map of the Torstenson Palace area

General information
- Location: Södra Hamngatan 1; 411 14 Gothenburg; Västra Götalands Län
- Construction started: 1648
- Completed: 1650
- Owner: Statens fastighetsverk

Website
- Lagskydd, Riksantikvarieämbetet.

The Torstenson Palace is a building on Södra Hamngatan in Gothenburg, also known as Kungshuset ('the King's House') because it was formerly the Swedish king's residence in Gothenburg. It is currently the residence and offices of the landshövding of Västra Götaland County.

The building was originally constructed in the years 1648–1650 for Count Lennart Torstenson, but was bought by Karl X Gustav in September 1657 and served as his residence during the 1658 and 1660 sessions of the Riksdag of the Estates (Swedish Parliament), which were held in Gothenburg. It later became the seat of the landshövding of Gothenburg and Bohus County, and has remained the seat of the county administration ever since, and of the wider Västra Götaland County since its creation in 1998. The first landshövding to reside at the palace was Erik Carlsson Sjöblad.

The palace is Gothenburg's oldest residential building, and has been recognised as a byggnadsminne (listed building) since 25 January 1935. The building's most famous role in recent years was as the venue for the 2001 meeting of the European Council.

== History ==
General Count Lennart Torstensson was appointed Governor-General of Västergötland, Dal, Värmland and Halland on 31 May 1648, and his instructions stipulated that his "ordinary residence" be located in Gothenburg. He had already purchased a plot of land in the city from the exiled Holsteiner Daniel Lange in February 1647, for the price of 1200 ducats; the plot measured 288 feet along the street and 125 feet deep on the west side. Torstensson hired Casper Wolter, a German builder living in Stockholm, to construct a house on the plot, and the work was completed within two years. The house itself, including the wing building, had ten rooms and two halls, with an area of 275 square metres on each floor.

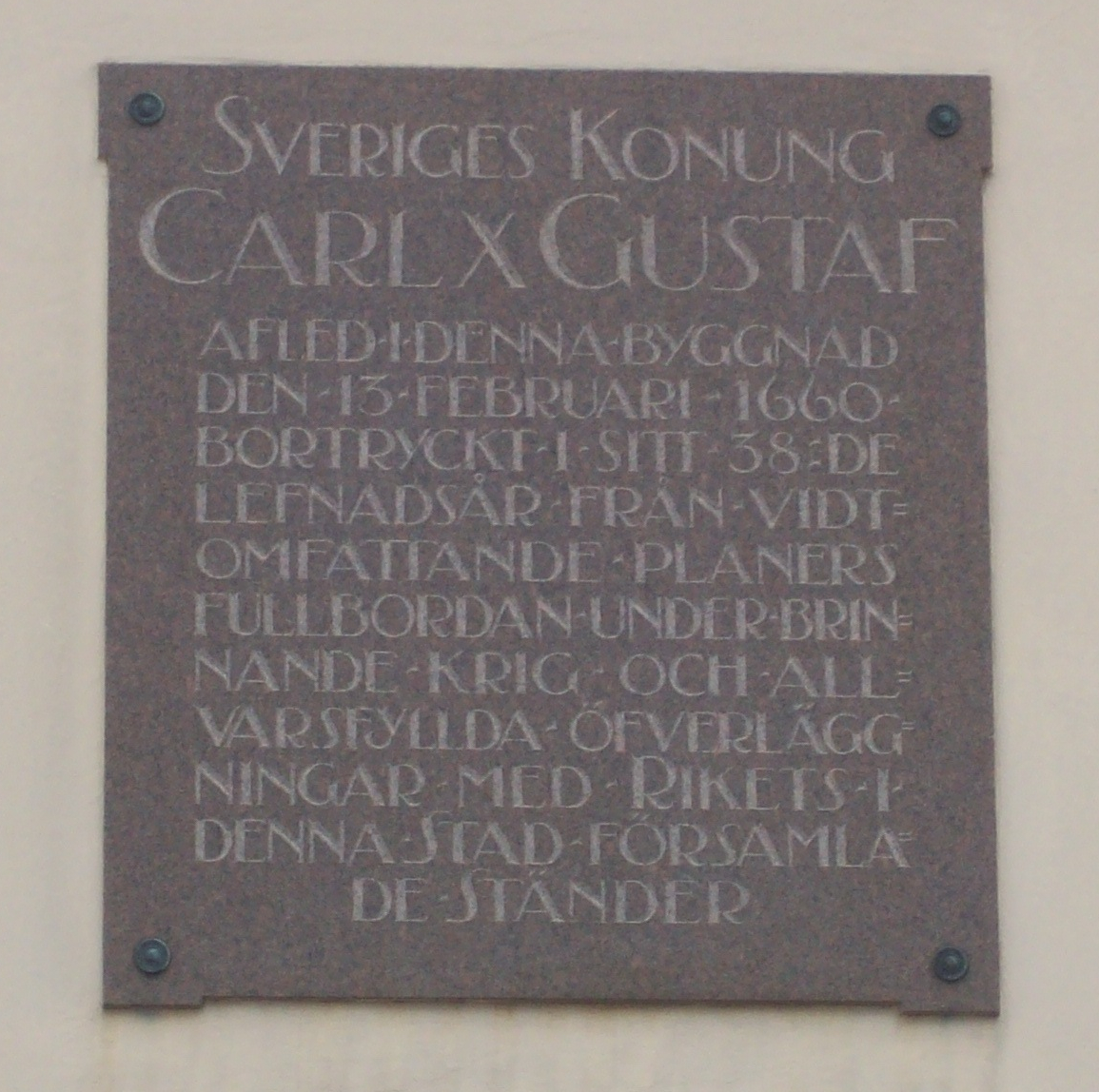
Plaque commemorating Karl X Gustav's death in the Torstenson Palace, 13 February 1660.

Torstensson died on 7 April 1651 in Stockholm, and six years later King Karl X Gustav purchased the count's newly completed Gothenburg palace from his widow, Countess Beata de la Gardie. The Torstenson Palace thus became the king's residence in Gothenburg, and indeed it was at the palace that Karl Gustav died, on 13 February 1660 at the age of 37. His son and namesake Karl XI lived at the Torstenson Palace while residing in Gothenburg during the years 1680–1683, 1689–1691 and 1694.

On 9 May 1700 the seat of the landshövding of Gothenburg and Bohus County was moved from Bohus Fortress to Gothenburg, and the Torstenson Palace was repurposed as his primary residence and the seat of the county administration. The first landshövding to reside at the palace was Erik Carlsson Sjöblad. Nevertheless, subsequent Swedish kings did still occasionally stay at the Torstenson Palace when they happened to be in Gothenburg. Most notably, it served as the headquarters for King Karl XII as he planned his Norwegian campaigns in the Great Northern War, and for King Gustav III when he directed the defence of Västergötland and Bohuslän against an invading Danish-Norwegian army in 1788, during the Theatre War.

The Torstenson Palace remained the seat of the county administration of Gothenburg and Bohus County throughout these upheavals and over the following two centuries. After Gothenburg and Bohus was merged with Skaraborg County and Älvsborg County to form Västra Götaland County in 1998, the palace became the seat of the county administration of the new, larger unit.

The Torstenson Palace has been remodelled and rebuilt several times in its history, most notably in 1875, when the house's area increased from just under 700 square meters to 1800 square meters. In connection with the rebuilding of corner rooms on the ground floor in 1964–1965, roof boards with paintings from the 17th century were discovered, which have been renovated. Another extensive renovation of interiors took place in 2000–2001. A great fire in 1804 seriously damaged the residence's stables and outbuildings, several of which had to be replaced altogether.

The Torstenson Palace shares a large courtyard space with the properties Södra Hamnatan 3 and Stora Badhusgatan 2, and has given its name to the Residence Bridge, (Swedish: Residensbron) which was completed in 1963 and crosses the harbour canal at Stora Bommen.

== Sources ==
- 100 utmärkta hus i Göteborg. [Arkitekten och staden]; [3]. Göteborg: Manne Ekman & Margareta Rydbo, Göteborgs stadsmuseum i samarbete med Göteborgs-posten. 2001. pp. 46–47. ISBN 91-85488-54-2.
- Residenset, map from Lantmäteriet. Retrieved 8 July 2014.
- "Länsresidenset Göteborg", Bebyggelseregistret, Riksantikvarieämbetet. Läst 8 July 2014.
- Femte roten, tomt 52, Kvarteret Residenset. Göteborgs tomter. Läst 8 juli 2014.
- "Landsstathuset", Bebyggelseregistret, Riksantikvarieämbetet. Retrieved 8 July 2014.
- Residenset, ed. Ingrid Holmberg, published by Kulturmiljöenheten vid Länsstyrelsen i Göteborgs och Bohus län 1992
- Residenset i Göteborg: 350 år i rikets tjänst, ed. Anders Franck, published by Museum of Gothenburg, 2001 ISBN 91-85488-55-0, ISSN 1404-9546
- G. Clemensson & Sven T. Kjellberg (1933). Monumenta Gothoburgensia.
- Per Nyström (1984). Länsresidenset i Göteborg. Göteborgs historiska mus. ISBN 91-85786-13-6.
- Studier i Göteborgs byggnadshistoria före 1814: Ett bidrag till svensk stadsbyggnadshistoria, [utvidgad upplaga], Serie: Svensk byggnadskultur, 99-0887545-0; 2, fil lic Arvid Bæckström, Nordiska museet, Stockholm 1923
- GHT, 24 April 1948, "Residenset jubilerar," av Olof Nordenskjöld.
