= Masthamnen =

Coordinates: 59°18′57″N 18°6′10″E

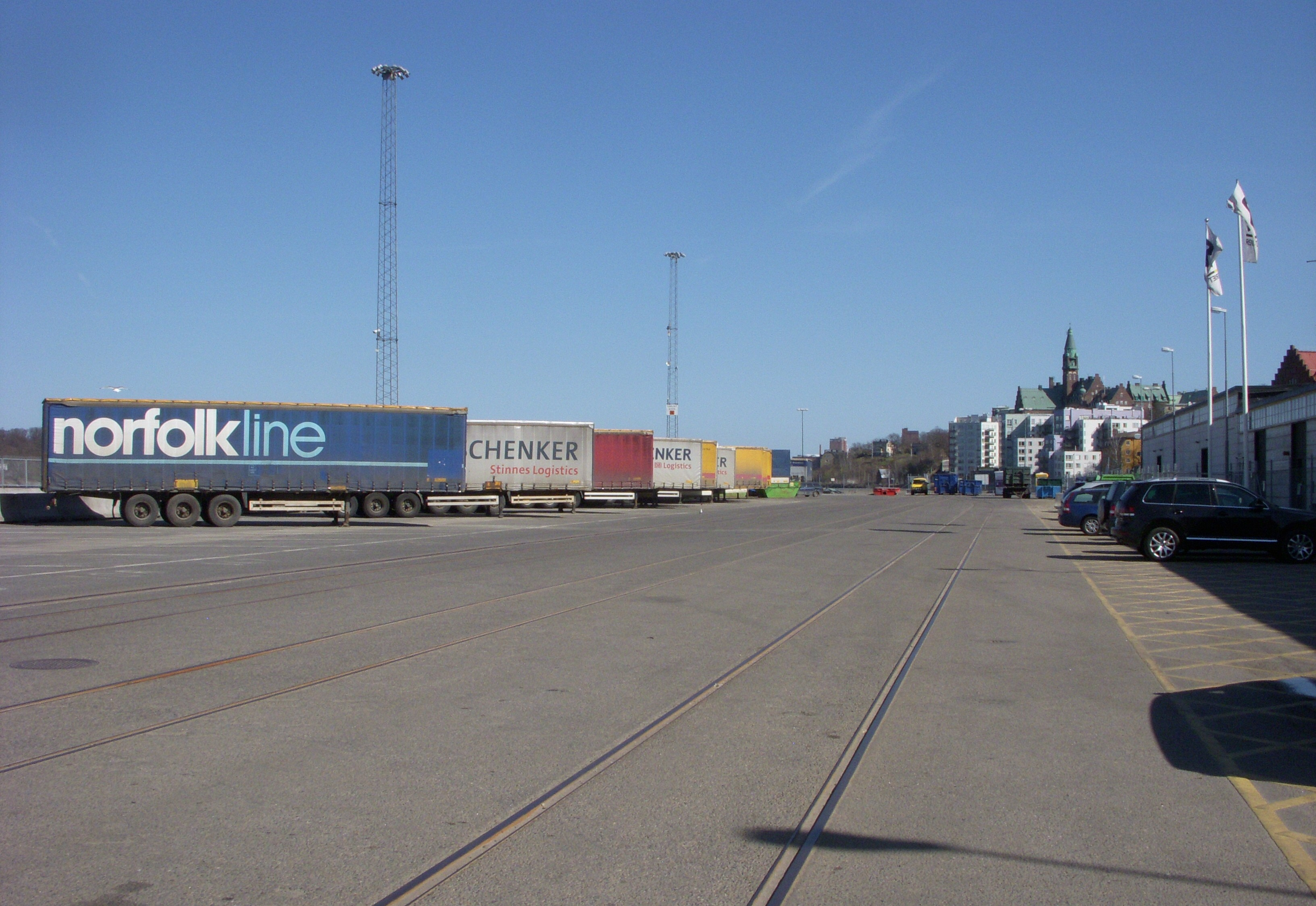
Yttre Masthamnen, view to the east with Danvikshemmet in the background.

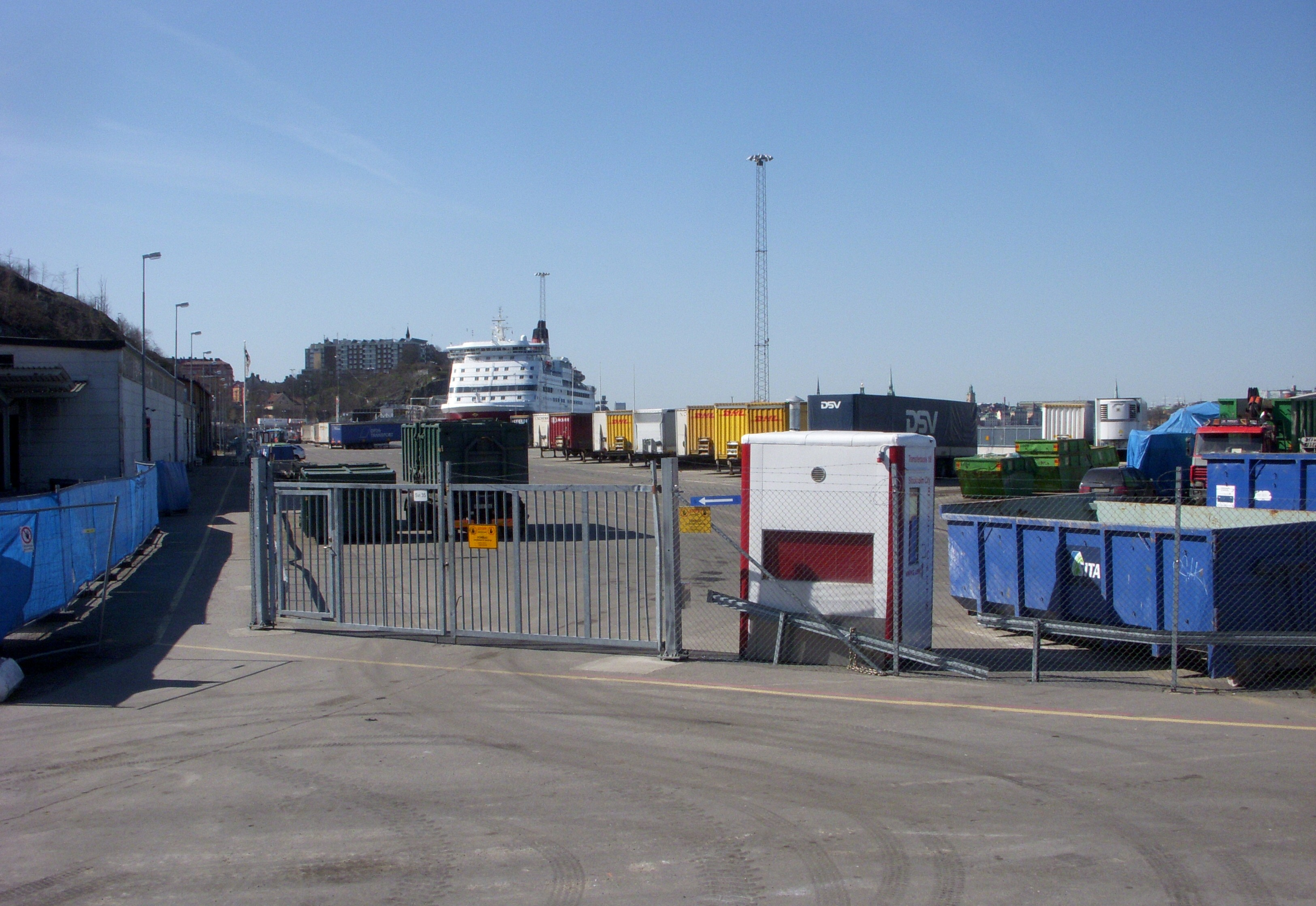
Yttre Masthamnen, view to the west with Ersta klippan and a Viking Line ship in the background.

Masthamnen and Yttre Masthamnen are the eastern extension of the Stadsgårdshamnen in Södermalm, Stockholm, Sweden. The wharf area, which is owned by the corporation Stockholms Hamnar, is about 600 metres long, and is mostly located between Londonviadukten and Fåfängan on one side and Saltsjön on the other, it stretches from Varvsbranten in the west to the mouth of the Danvikskanalen channel in the east. Today, Masthamnen serves the Viking Line cruiseferries while Yttre Masthamnen serves international cruise ships.

== Etymology ==
A "mast harbour" (masthamn) was an area in a harbour, surrounded with a palisade, where lumber used for masts was stored.

== History ==
Masthamnen in 1948 with the Ersta cliff in the background.

Masthamnen got its current name in 1925. The naming board of the city of Stockholm states: "A map from 11 January 1774 over the area, established as a permission to use the cliff for businessman Fredrik Lundin [...] shows the situation of the mast harbour previously located by the western end of the cliff face." Even on a drawing of the Stockholm ship docks from 1745 can "masthamnen" be seen mentioned. The "cliff face" referred to Fåfängan and Fredrik Lundin constructed his mansion and his villa Fåfängan there. The mansion is still there, nowadays located in the wharf area.

Together with the need to expand Stadsgårdshamnen, work on the ship docks could no longer continue, Tegelviken was reconstructed, and the new Stadsgårdshamnen and its exit to Folkungagatan was inaugurated in August 1910. In the 1940s, the area for Yttre Masthamnen was developed, partly on a filled part of Saltsjön. On a Stockholm map from 1940 there are three narrow areas named Hamnarbetaren, Skeppslasten and Vinschen.

== Current situation ==
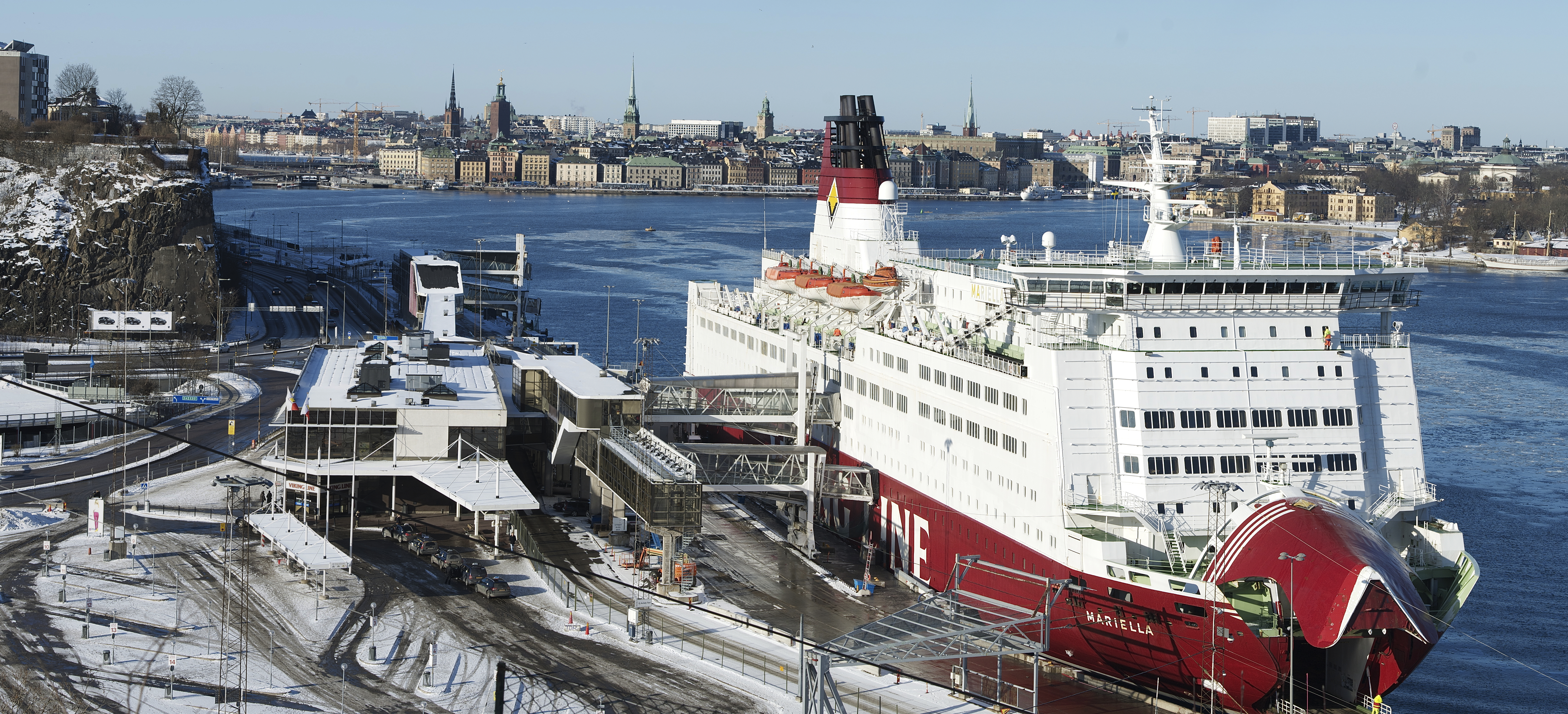
Viking Line's MS Mariella in Masthamnen.

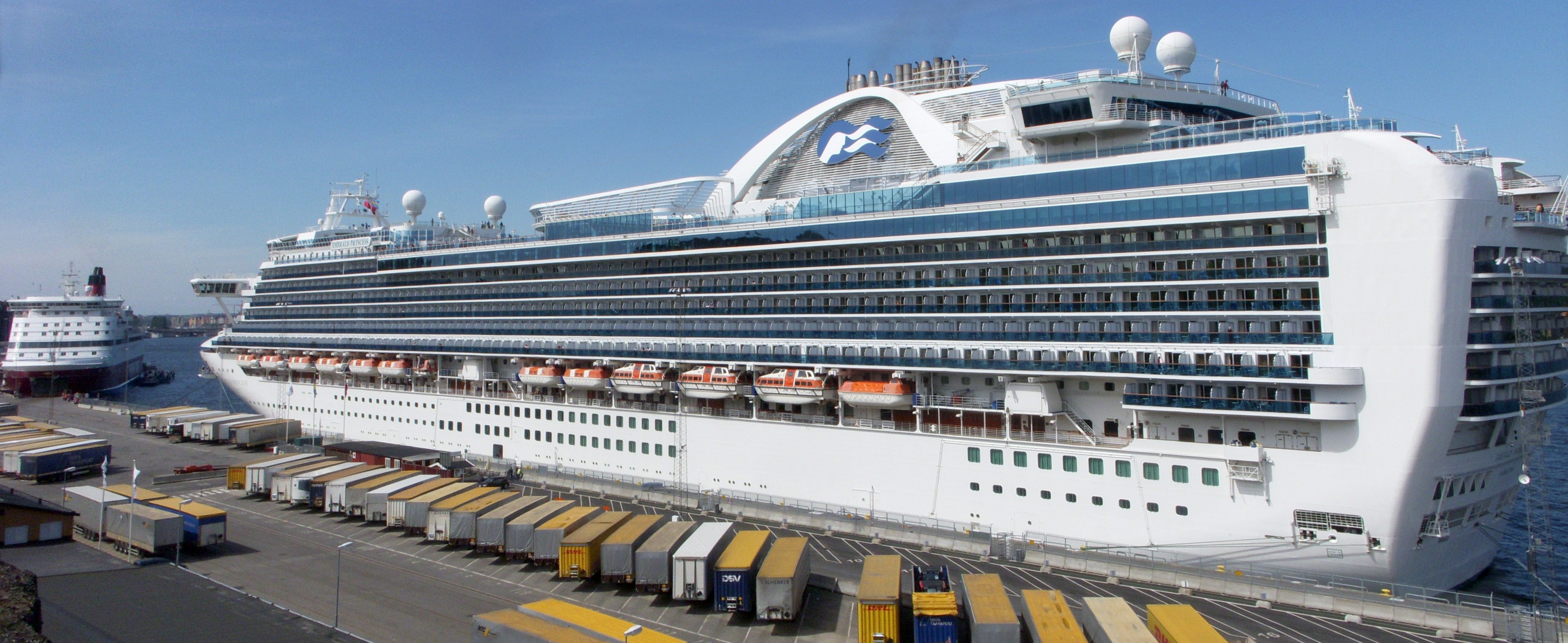
The cruise ship MS Emerald Princess in Yttre Masthamnen.

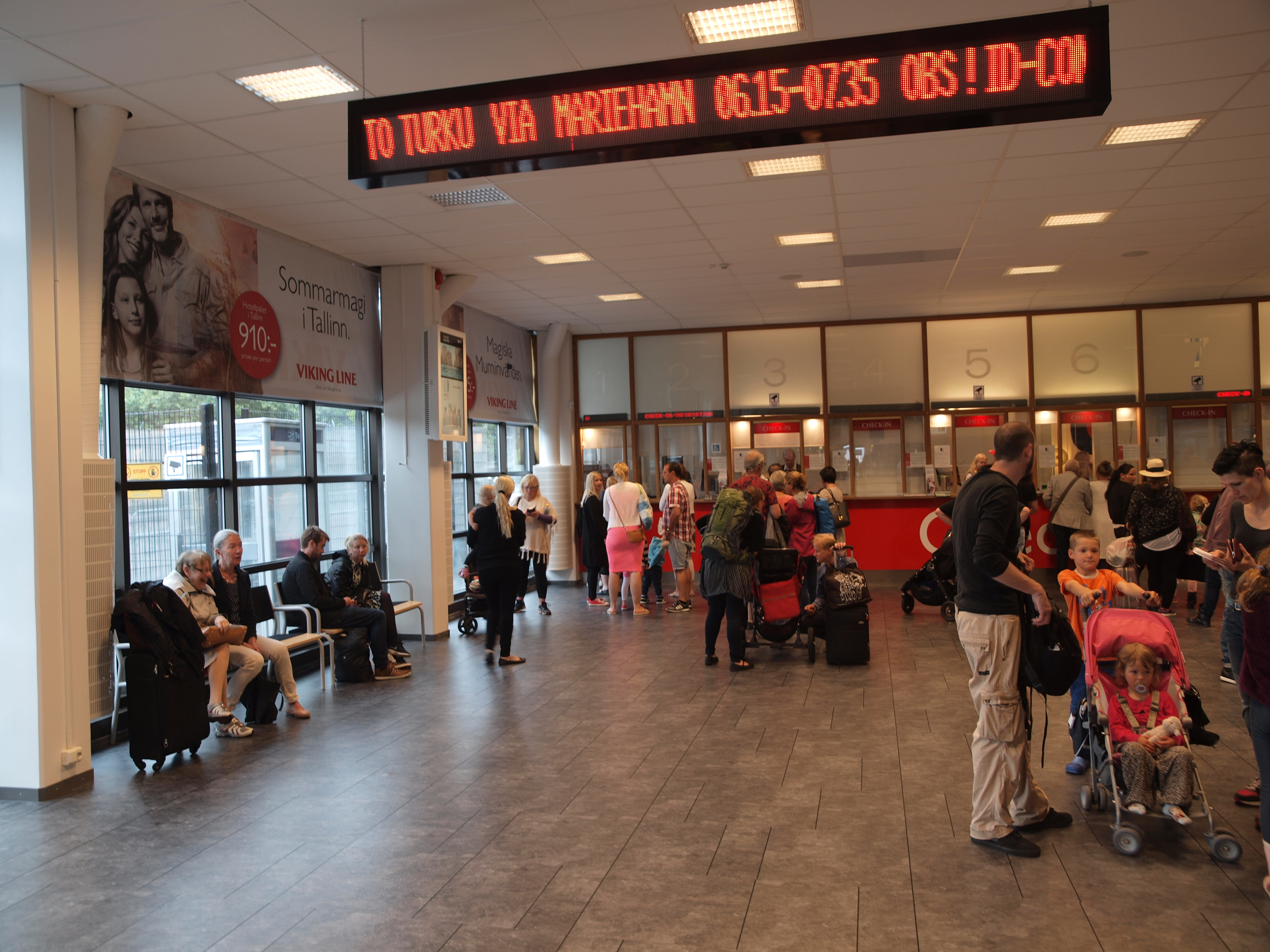
Interior of the Viking Line terminal.

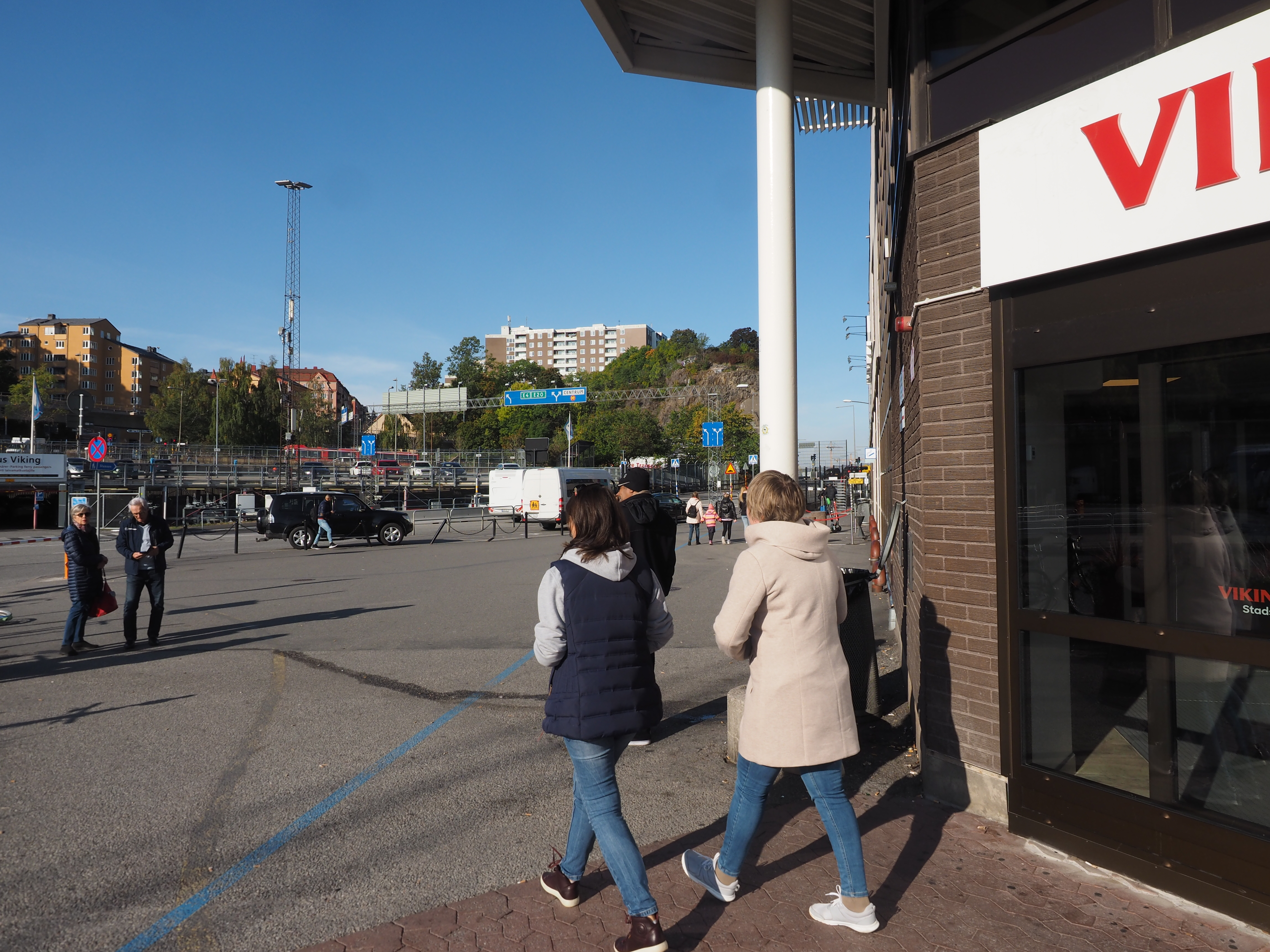
A view of just outside the Viking Line terminal, looking north towards Slussen, Gamla stan and the city centre. The blue line in the foreground marks a pedestrian route all the way from the terminal to Slussen.

Stadsgården, together with Masthamnen, is an important harbour for cruiseferry traffic. Masthamnen's western part and the Londonviadukten area now (2011) serve Viking Line cruiseferries. Yttre Masthamnen is the only central location in Stockholm where large cruise ships can anchor. Stockholms Hamnar has two wharf places here. Outside travel season, the area is poorly used and is spotted with large asphalt areas with parking places for lorries and containers. The construction board of the city of Stockholm has made a detailed plan which gives Viking Line the right to retain the buildings that have had temporary building permissions until the year 2017.

== Masthamnen development project ==
The Danvikslösen project contains a plan to rebuild the Saltsjöbanan to match the double track standard of the Tvärbanan. The current plan is to widen the current track, with a new station south of Londonviadukten. The Danvikslösen project has presented several development proposals, containing drawings by Jan Inghe-Hagström (1944-2005), a former plan architect in the municipality of Stockholm, White arkitekter and Rosenbergs Arkitekter. Of the proposals, White arkitekter was seen to have the best connection to the rest of north-eastern Södermalm. Their proposals include a proposal to cover Londonviadukten with a roof. According to a rough cost analysis, covering Londonviadukten with a roof should cost about 250 million kronor. Other costs have not been studied.

== Sources ==
- Stahre, Nils-Gustaf, Fogelström, Per Anders (1986): Stockholms gatunamn: innerstaden. Monografier utgivna av Stockholms stad (volume 1). Stockholm: Liber/Allmänna förlaget. LIBRIS 7269073. ISBN 91-38-90777-1
