= Bourse (Gothenburg) =

Building in Gothenburg, Sweden

Coordinates: 57°42′28″N 11°58′2″E

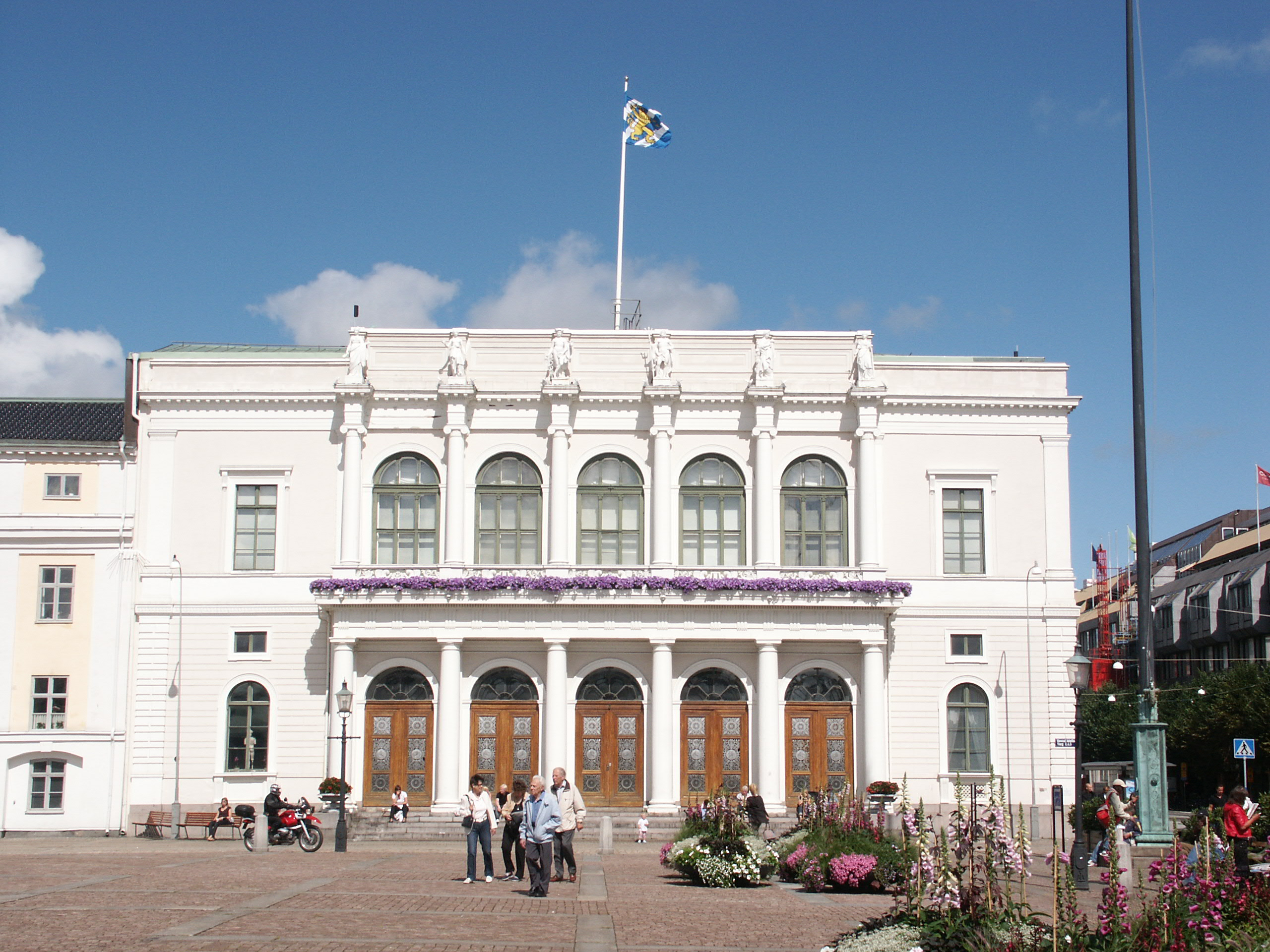
The neoclassical facade of the Gothenburg bourse

The Bourse (Swedish: Börsen) is a municipal building in Gothenburg, western Sweden. It is located on the north side of Gustaf Adolf Square.

Originally it was designed as a mercantile exchange, with a ballroom, by architect Pehr Johan Ekman in the Neoclassical style. It opened on 1 December 1849. The Gothenburg Municipal Council and its predecessor have conducted their meetings here since 5 January 1863.

The Swedish term for this building, Börsen (derived from the French "La bourse"), is frequently mis-translated into English as "The Stock Exchange". However, the building was never primarily a stock exchange, but rather a commercial exchange or mercantile exchange (see Exchange (organized market)), in the same spirit as a modern commodities exchange. Although the Gothenburg exchange had no royal patronage, it fulfilled a similar function to the contemporaneous royal exchanges of, for example, Dublin, Edinburgh and London.

== History ==
By statute enacted in 1661, the first trade guild in Sweden was created in Gothenburg, meeting at a town hall building located on what is now the Gustaf Adolf Square.

The current Bourse building is located on the site of the Kaulbarska House, that had been owned by Baron Johan von Kaulbars, who had been a general in the army of King Charles XII. The mansion was demolished in the early 19th century, to make way for a new civic building.

By 1844, the city's merchants had raised enough funds for the construction of this building, with the cornerstone being laid by King Oscar I on 1 June 1844 and the building being completed in 1849.

Since the original meeting of the Gothenburg city council in 1863 the Bourse has been the ordinary meeting place of the council and the current municipal council which succeeded the city council.

A renovation project of the Högvakten neighbourhood, including the Bourse, began in the autumn of 2014. Works were completed in early 2019 and the municipal council returned to the building.
