= German Church, Gothenburg =

German Church
- Tyska Christinae kyrka
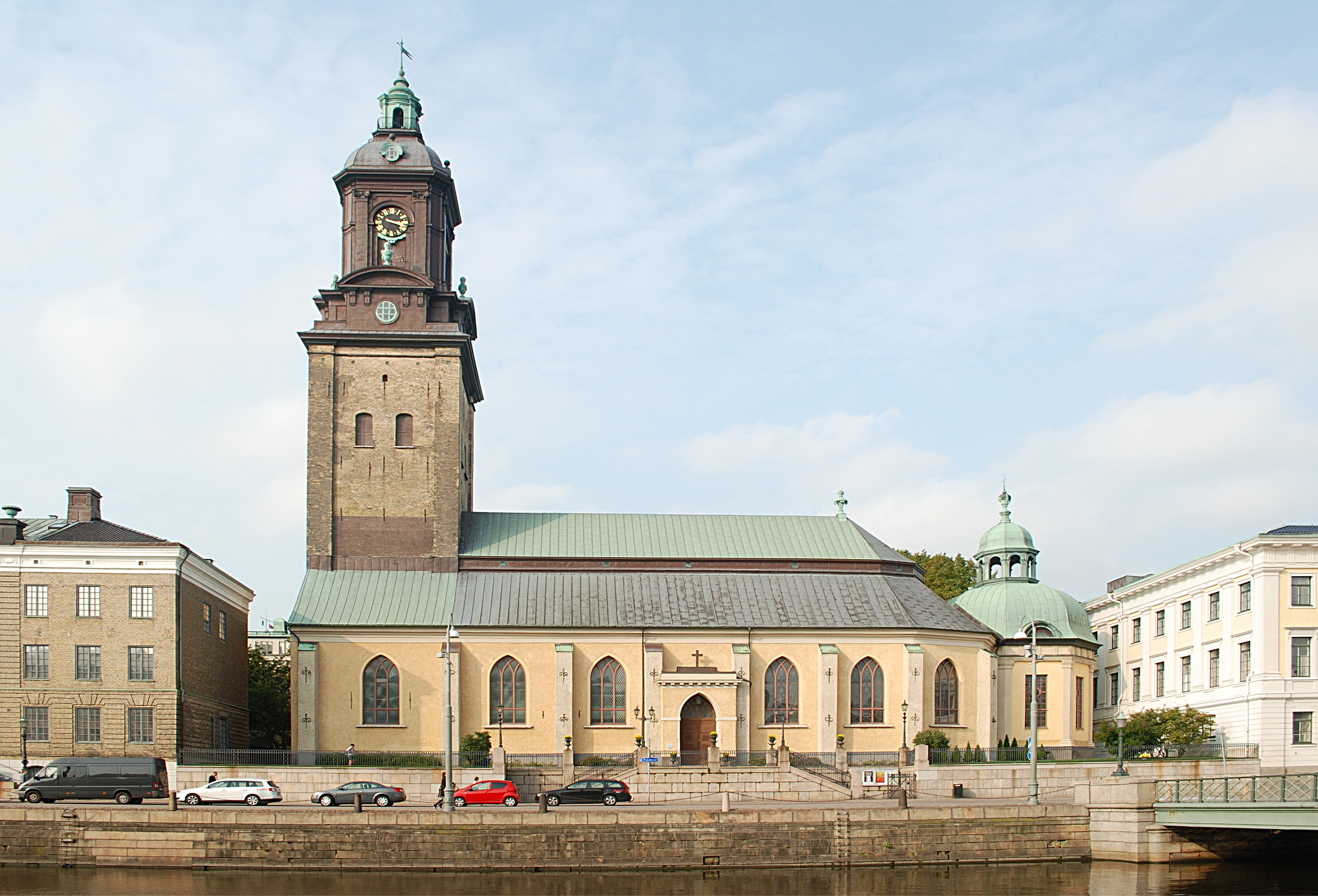
- German Church, September 2010
- German Church
- 57°42′24.13″N 11°57′53.2″E
- Location: Gothenburg
- Country: Sweden
- Denomination: Lutheran, Church of Sweden
- Website: svenskakyrkan.se/tyska

History
- Consecrated: 1648

Architecture
- Groundbreaking: 1634
- Completed: 1672 (first), 1748 (second)
- Demolished: 10. may 1669 (first); 14. january 1746 (second)

Administration
- Diocese: Diocese of Gothenburg
- Parish: German Christinae Parish

The German Church (German: Deutsche Kirche, Swedish: Tyska kyrkan), also called Christinae Church (Christinae kyrka, Christinenkirche), is church located in the city centre of Gothenburg, Sweden. Named after Queen Christina, it was inaugurated in 1748, and used by the German and Dutch congregation in Gothenburg. The church contains a 42-bell carillon, which was cast by the Bergholtz Bellfoundry in 1961.
