= Gothenburg City Hall =

Building in Gothenburg, Sweden

Coordinates: 57.70683°N 11.96566°E

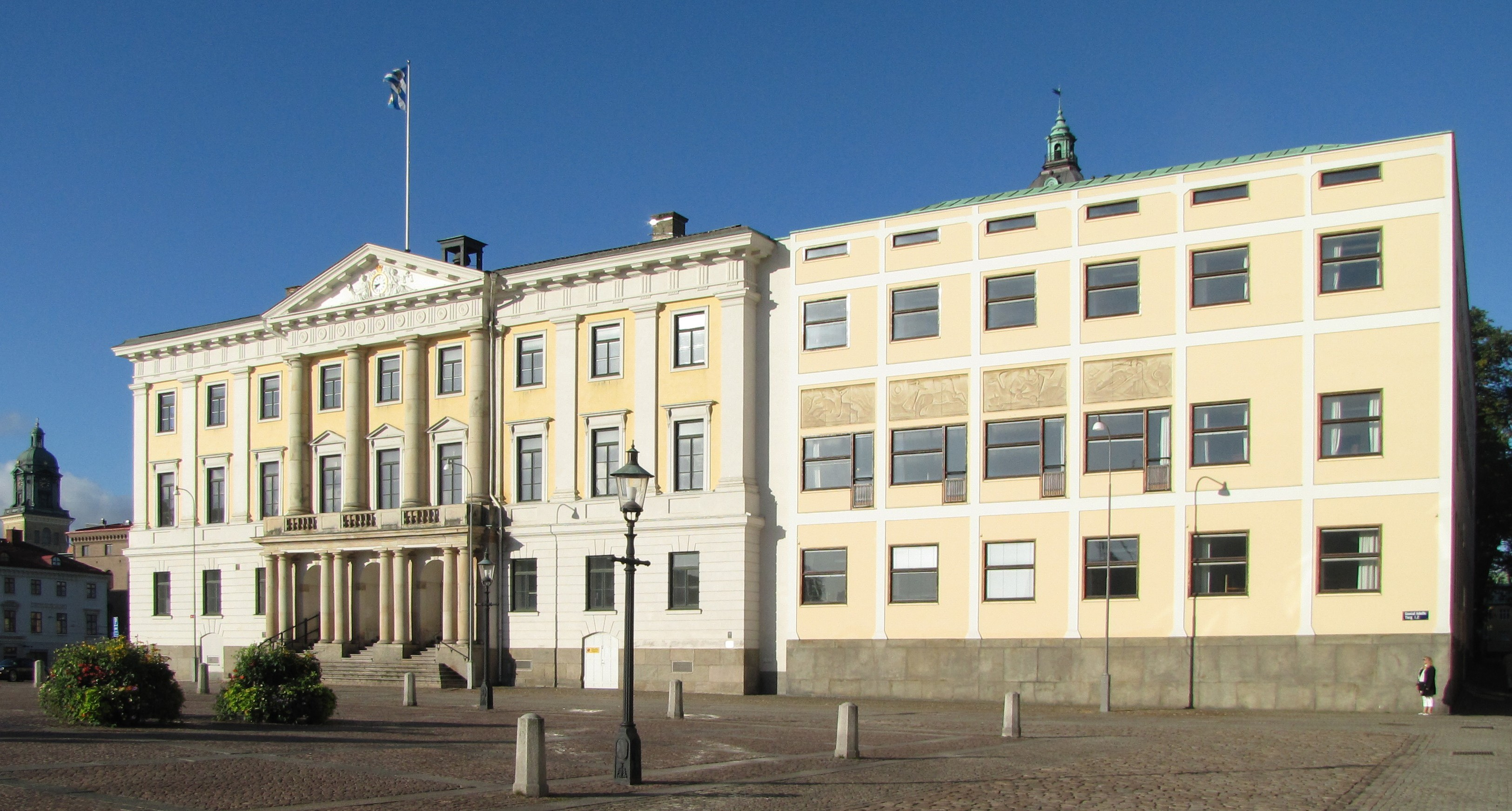
The Gothenburg City Hall, formerly law court

The Gothenburg City Hall (Swedish: Göteborgs rådhus) is located in Gothenburg, Sweden. It was designed in the Beaux-Arts style and was used primarily as a law court until 2010.

The older building was built c. 1672. The architect was Carl Böös. The newer part was finished in 1936 after the design and supervision by architect Gunnar Asplund.
