= Götaälvbron =

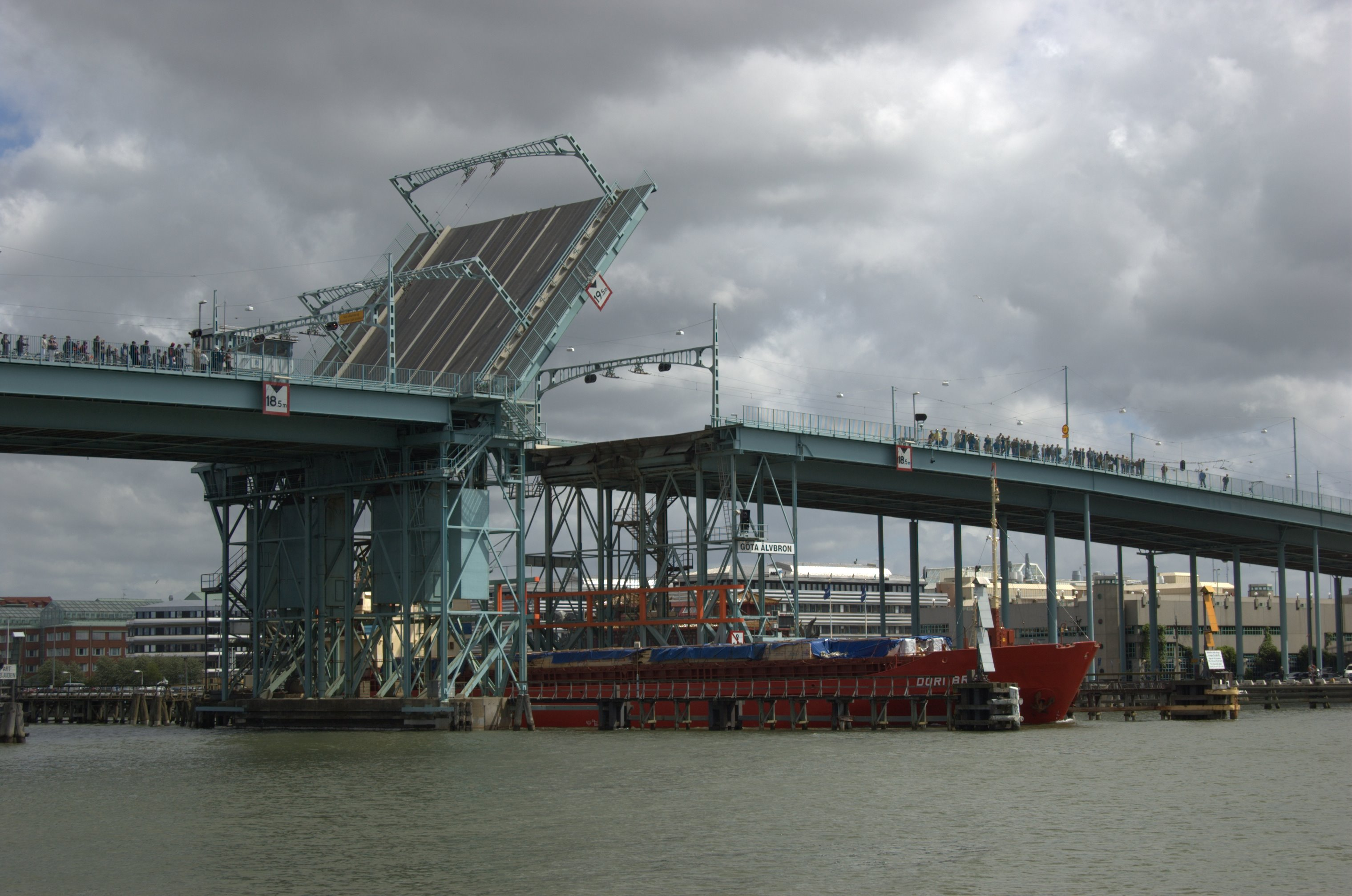
- Coordinates: 57°42′52.3″N 11°58′1.0″E
- Crosses: Göta älv
- Locale: Gothenburg, Sweden
- Followed by: Hisingsbron

Characteristics
- Design: Bascule bridge
- Total length: 927 m (3,041 ft)
- Width: 20 m (66 ft)
- Height: 19.5 m (64 ft)

History
- Construction start: 1937
- Construction end: 1939, 1966
- Opened: 26 November 1939
- Closed: 2021

Location
- Interactive map of Götaälvbron

Götaälvbron (lit. 'The Göta älv Bridge') was a bascule bridge in central Gothenburg, Sweden, carrying normal road vehicles and trams. The bridge was constructed in 1937 to 1939 and in 1966 it was widened. It was closed for decommissioning in June 2021. Constructed of steel beam, the bridge had a total length of 927 m (3,041 ft) and width of 20 m (66 ft). The mid span had a free height of 19.5 m (64 ft).

== Geography ==
The bridge connected the island of Hisingen with the main land of Gothenburg between Nils Ericssongatan and Hjalmar Brantningsgatan on Hisingen. The bridge crossed the river just east of Lilla Bommen on the mainland side and just east of Freeport on the Hisingen side.

== History ==
As far back as the 1870s, there were discussions about a high bridge in Majorna, from Bangatan to Skat Mountain in Lindholmen. In 1904, it was proposed to build a tunnel between the Lilla Bommen and Tingstadsvassen. After the decision that the old bridge of Hisingen would be replaced, the choice was between a new bridge or a tunnel. A principle decision was taken in 1933 on what would become a "Götaälvbro" and the question was consequently put on hold for some time. Preparatory ground works began in November 1935.

The bridge is used by motor vehicles, trams, bicycles and pedestrians. The bridge cost 8.2 million Swedish kronor (SEK) to construct, of which the state contributed 25%. With access points included the final cost were 13 million SEK.

The bridge was built mainly by Germans and was inaugurated on 26 November 1939 by Communications Minister Gerhard Strindlund, in the presence of representatives of port authorities from Oslo, Copenhagen and Helsinki. At the time, the bridge was only four-lane, but was later expanded by one lane and walking and cycle tracks on each side.

Until 1968, the heavy transit traffic of the E6 highway used the bridge, but even in 2016, the bridge is the most important connection primarily for local traffic and public transport between central Gothenburg and Hisingen even with the presence of Älvsborgsbron, Tingstadstunneln and Angeredsbron.

With the construction of Hisingsbron which began in 2017 and opened traffic for pedestrians, bicycles, cars and buses on 9 May 2021. Götaälvbron stopped traffic on 12 June 2021.

== Future ==
Gotaälvbron has now been replaced by Hisingsbron, approximately one block east. Demolition could not take place until Hisingsbron had been built, as the former bridge served as Hisingen's only tram link with the mainland.

The demolition of the bridge began during the summer of 2021 in conjunction with the opening of Hisingsbron, and was completed in spring 2022.
