= Lilla Bommen (building) =

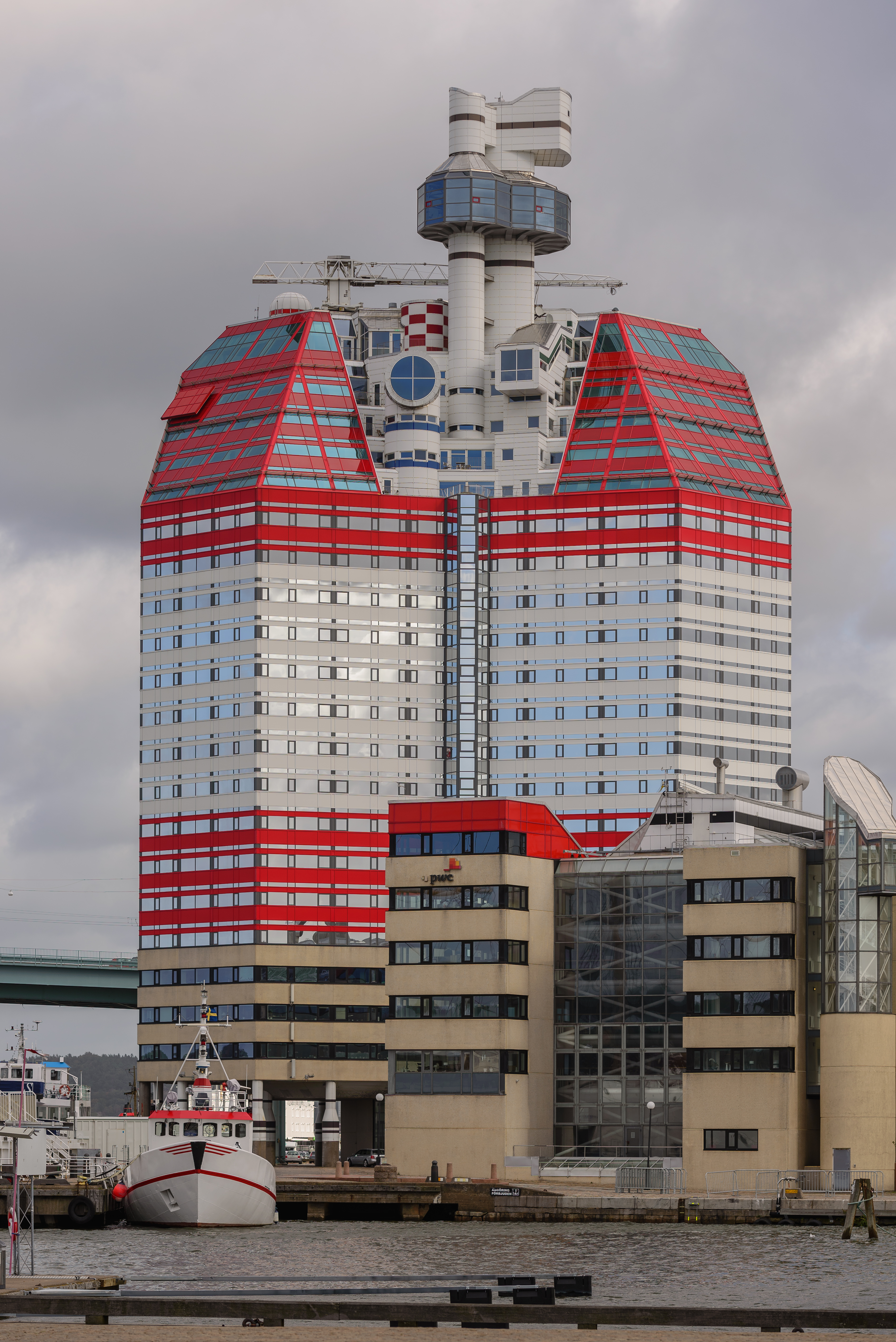
- Lilla Bommen, building
- Interactive map of the Lilla Bommen area

General information
- Status: Completed
- Type: Office
- Location: Gothenburg, Sweden
- Coordinates: 57°42′48″N 11°58′4″E
- Construction started: 1986
- Completed: 1989
- Owner: Vasakronan
- Operator: Vasakronan

Height
- Antenna spire: 86 m (282 ft)

Technical details
- Floor count: 22

Design and construction
- Architect: Ralph Erskine
- Structural engineer: White arkitekter
- Main contractor: Skanska

The Lilla Bommen, commonly referred to as Läppstiftet (lit. 'The lipstick'), is an 86 m (282 ft), 22-floor building housing office, networking and restaurant spaces in Gothenburg, Sweden, named after the surrounding location of Lilla Bommen. The building's distinct post-modern architectural style, popularly referred to as "The Lipstick" due to its distinctive red-and-white colour schematic, was erected on the banks of Göta älv in 1989 by Skanska Property West AB. The 32000 sqm office space which houses over 900 office workers, is a popular tourist destination for its top-floor lookout, Götheborgs Utkiken and restaurants such as the Restuarang Läppstiftet, has contributed to the landmark status of the building in the Central Gothenburg skyline.

The waterways of the area which link to the Kattegat Strait, the North Sea and the Atlantic, historically formed Gothenburg into a significant shipping centre as Sweden's principal seaport. The historical boom-arms dating from the 1600s which protected the important trading routes of the area are reflected in the name Lilla Bommen (Little Boom in English). These aspects tied into Swedish-British designer Ralph Erskine's desire to embody the history and "improve human relations" to the area through his design of the Läppstiftet.

The design of the Lilla Bommen faced early negative response by the Swedish public, contributed in large part by traditional European architectural styles that generally disincentivised multi-storey office building designs and tall skyscrapers in European cityscapes. Furthermore, additional difficulties arose in the design and construction process due to the unstable foundation and location of the structure placed alongside waterways. The use of piling construction was a prominent feature of the new project that was used to support the heavy loads to overcome the issues regarding inundation and ground settlement of the waterfront location.

== Site/location – prior existing construction ==
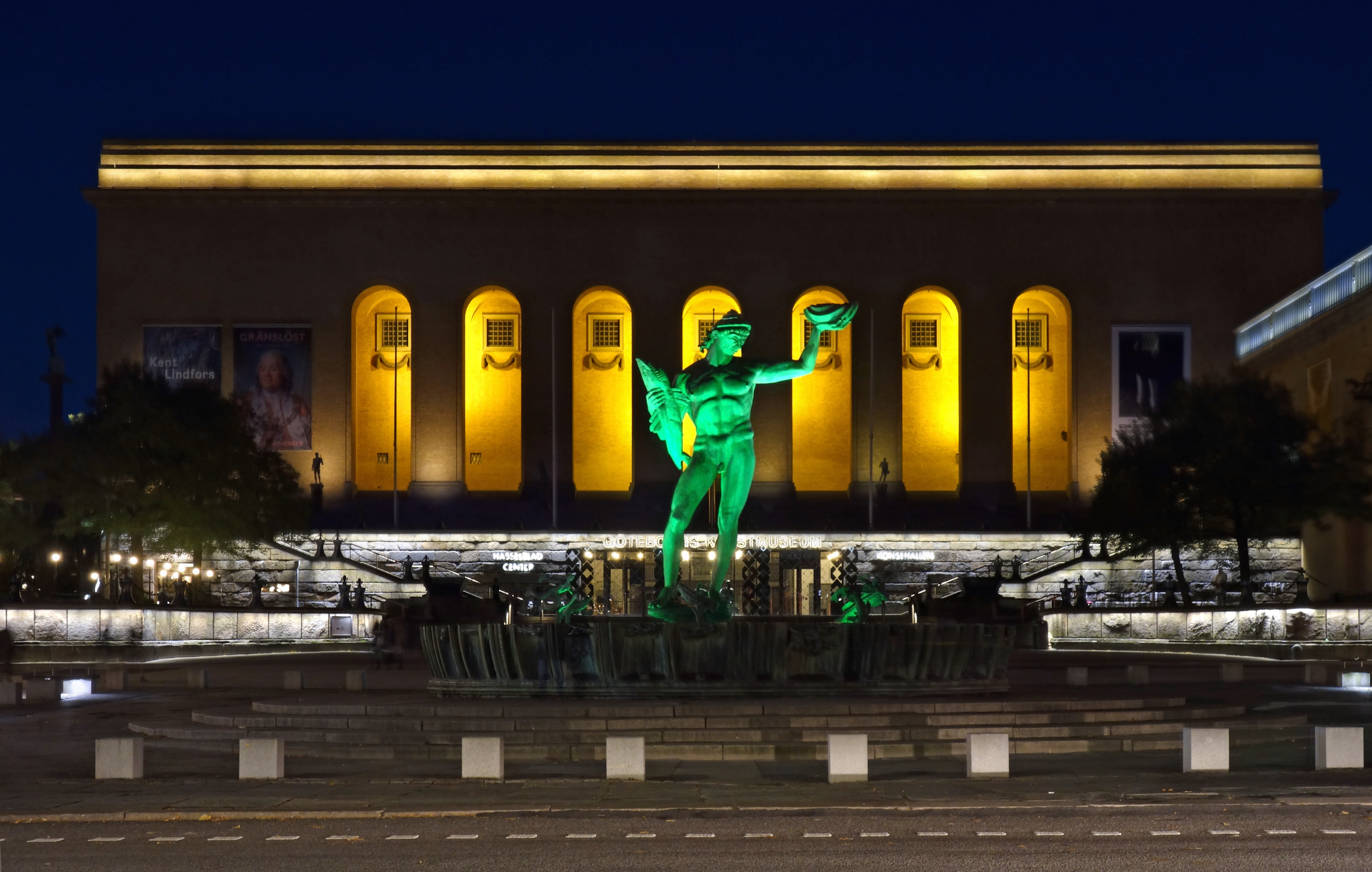
The Statue Poseidon by Carl Milles

The Lilla Bommen building is located in central Gothenburg and overlooks the Göta älv directly at the waterfront. The immediate area around the Lilla Bommen building site historically formed a key central district of Gothenburg with a major infrastructural focal point upon an enclosed ring road around the city square. At the centre point of this city square was the Statue Poseidon by Carl Milles, which was surrounded by major residential and commercial areas including museums, theatres and the Nord Stad Parking structure. The Nord Stad parking garage continued to link with multiple buildings containing further housing, retail, hotel, and arcade areas that further contribute to the infrastructure within the Lilla Bommen area.

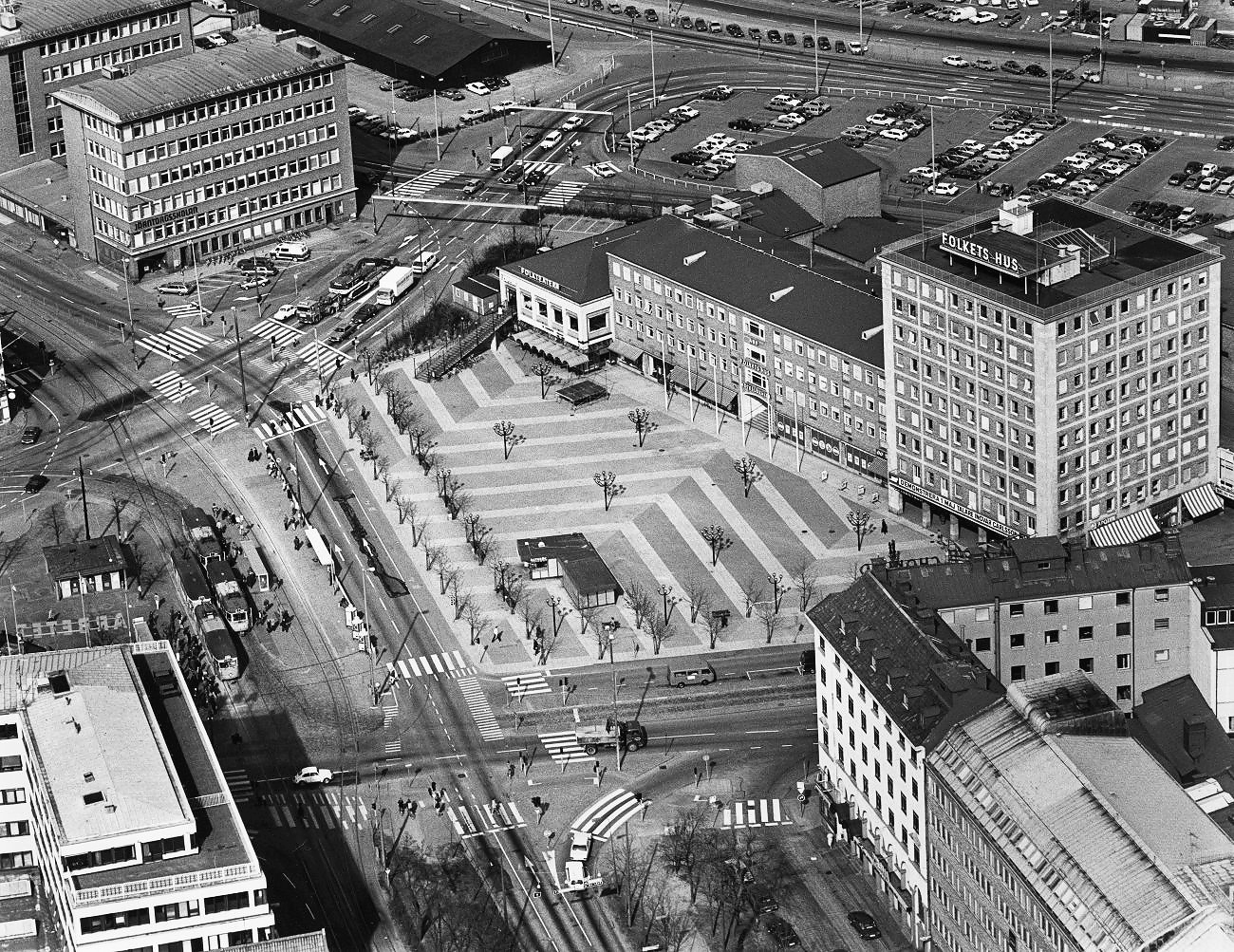
Järntorget in Gothenburg (1982)

Further discussed within Robert Trancik's case study in his text "Finding Lost Space", is the infill construction that restored the large area of which the Lillla Bommen building presides today. The prior highway interchange that predominated the large area that new infrastructure at the waterfront of the Göta Canal was remodelled to accommodate the reclamation of unused "Lost space" as referred to by Transik. The area named the Järntorget (The Iron Square), composed largely of roadwork was the result of infill and highway restructuring in the area, aimed at improving the waterfront aspect of the Lilla Bommen region. The historical redevelopment of the Järntorget region acted as the foundation for which the Lilla Bommen building was constructed allowing for the reinstatement of the inner-city to waterfront region as its prominent modern day commercial and residential district.

== Design history ==
The Lilla Bommen building was a part of a city initiative in the 1980s aimed at restoring the connection to the city's central waterfront, the Göta Canal. The proposals sought to create a balanced central square that provided both functional areas for shops and offices, and open public places that created cohesion to the waterfronts of the city that had been lost by prior existing infrastructure. The Lilla Bommen building stands distinctive from Sweden's "groundscraper" traditional office buildings, which became popularised in urban and suburban areas of Sweden's cities owing to the lack of space constraints of the areas.

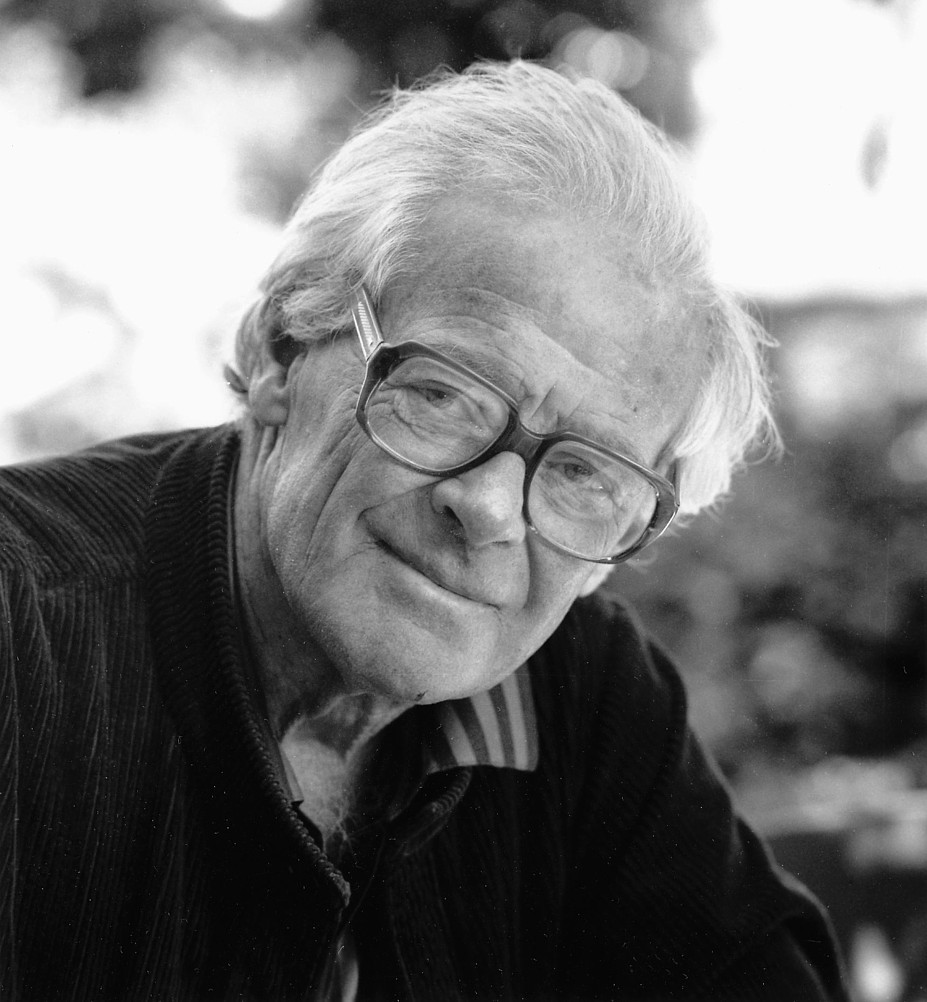
Ralph Erskine, principal architect for the Lilla Bommen Building

The project was a joint initiative between the Skanska Group and principal architect Ralph Erskine. The Skanska Group which assumed responsibility over the construction of the project, that began construction processes in 1986, also took management responsibility in renovating pre-existing infrastructure in the area, as well as financing the purchase of the land on which the new structure could be built. Ralph Erskine, a Swedish-British architect, assumed the role of principal architect and was responsible for the distinctive design of the Läppstiftet. Erskine became recognised for his core focuses upon "user participation" and "environmental compatibility" with design principles based upon contrasts between different materials in the construction which are all prominent aspects in the distinctive design of the Lilla Bommen building.

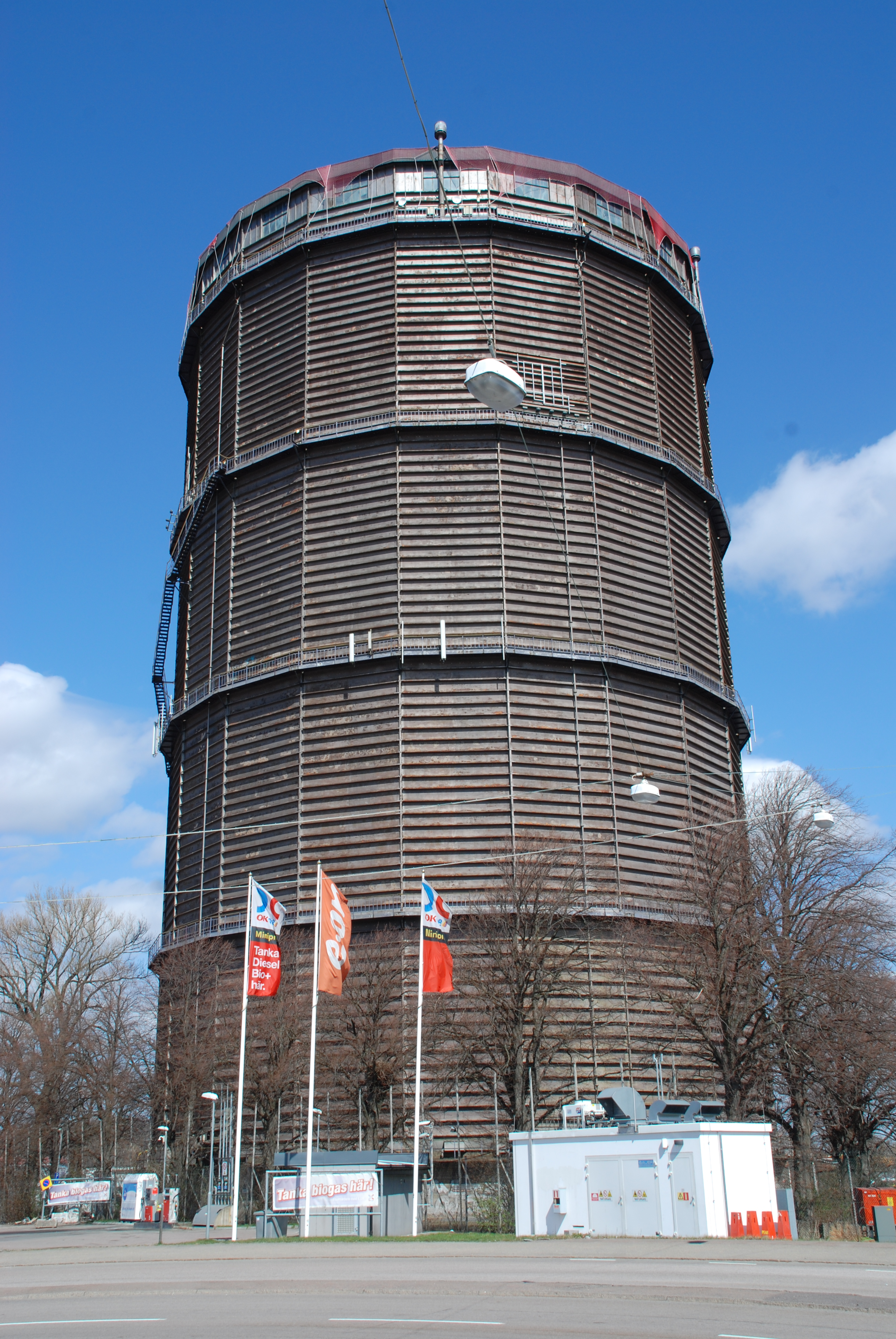
The Gasklockan in Gothenburg, Sweden

The traditional designs of Swedish office spaces are characterised by their narrow floor plans. This design is usually composed of single-corridor plans attached to workspaces that outlook the facades of each side of the construction. As discussed within Juriaan van Meel's The European Office, the limitations of Sweden's characteristic linear office spaces is within the inefficient ratio between building façade sizes compared to the functional office space inside the building. Erskine overcame cost limitations that pervaded the linear-office design, through a high functionality, flexible, low-maintenance design that enabled an increased floor space by over 20%. Another aspect of the Lilla Bommen's distinct design was its asymmetrical structure that was implemented to achieve height pre-requisites of the construction; the building's height was intended to improve harmonization with both the waterfront nature of the property, as well as existing skyscrapers in the area, including but not limited to the Gasklockan, and Hotell Gothia.

=== Initial response ===
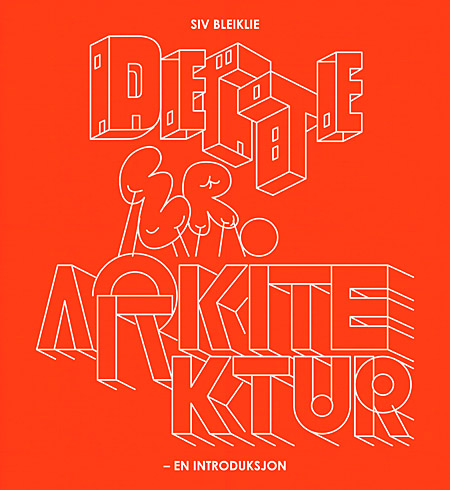
Cover from the Arkitektur magazine

The majority of Swedish office development and planning follows a largely traditional architectural identity. As Meel discusses in The European Office, amongst many European countries, Sweden similarly follows its "historical urban context", with general attitudes towards skyscrapers being largely negative and connoted with being unrelated to the general design principles of Swedish cityscapes. This was also emphasised within Arkitektur, a prominent architectural magazine in Sweden, which Meel also discusses, where the Swedish disdain for multi-storey buildings is mentioned. This has become a large motivating factor from which Swedish linear offices became popularised, which disincentivise the construction of large multi-storey office complexes, bringing rise to the ground-scrapers that have shaped Swedish cityscapes.

The construction of the Lilla Bommen brought rise to these negative pre-existing social attitudes towards the construction of taller buildings. Further discussed by Meel, is the influence of "democratically orientated" town planning in Swedish culture, that has enabled a greater voice of the people in the formation of Swedish towns. The difficulties for architects arise due to these new considerations that must be made when proposing designs, that factor not only the "interests of investors" and "architectural aesthetics" but also the increasing voice of the people in building design. This voice can be clearly emphasised by the Lilla Bommen's ground-scraper design, being far smaller in footprint compared to other international designs. Considering this factor in the design of the Lilla Bommen, designers still faced large amounts negative press and public response to the new construction which resulted in delays to the design procedure for both the architects and investors. One of the main criticisms against the implementation of large high-rising designs has been the naturally low population densities within European countries. In Sweden, a large emphasis on outward development away from inner-cities has been one of the main results of this lower population density, and served to catalyse a large proportion of negative attitudes towards the construction of taller office buildings such as the Lilla Bommen.

== Construction process ==
Skanska, the construction group responsible for the Lilla Bommen, described the construction process as both unusual and challenging. The primary peculiarity that distinguished the construction of the Lilla Bommen, was that design and construction work were at times performed simultaneously which became problematic for the construction group in terms of logistics surrounding labour and material allocation. This was the result of the unique and distinctive design of the Lilla Bommen that necessitated constant communication between the architects and engineers responsible for its construction to overcome the hurdles set by its complex design.

=== Foundation ===
==== Piling construction ====
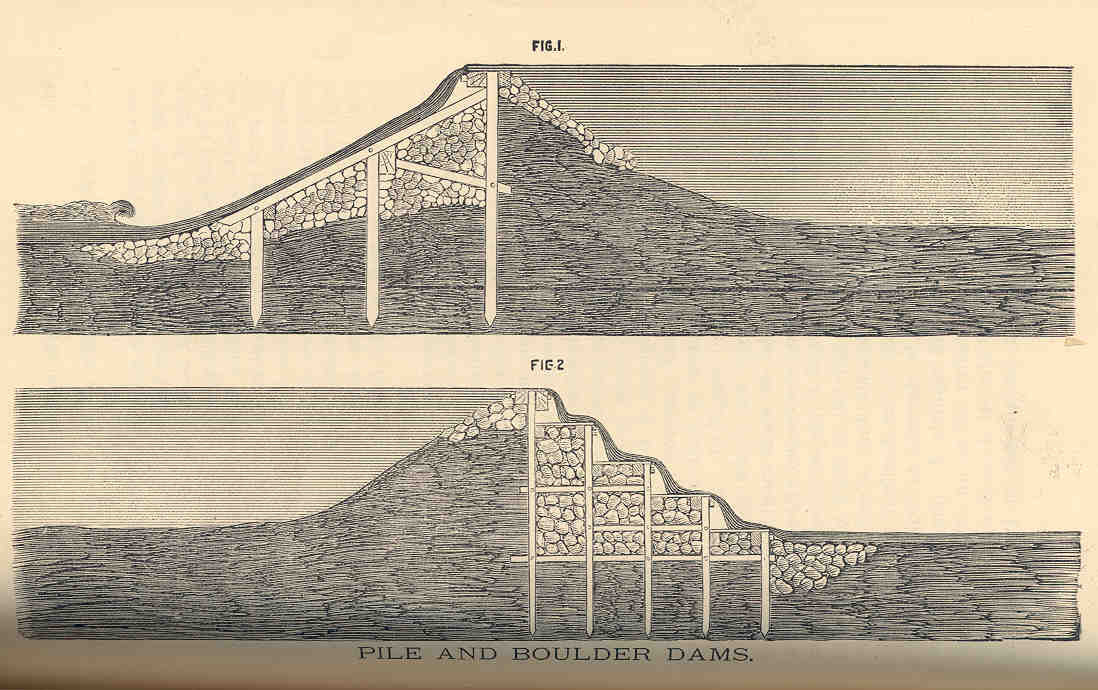
The use of pile construction is common near waterfront locations, such as application in dams. This involves the driving of long "piles" into sediment or clay to stabilise the foundation of structures

Another construction challenge posed by the project was the location where construction was to occur. The pre-existing area composed largely of clay sediment would cause implications for the stability of a building with the proposed load imposed by the high-rise. The construction as such incorporated the use of pile engineering, with pile-lengths of 95 m that would sustain a maximum permitted load of up to 1,100 kN. The engineering process of implementing pile foundations involves the creation of boreholes into soft land and driving reinforced-concrete into the holes that stabilise the construction placed on top. Piles are used commonly in applications such as at the Lilla Bommen, near waterfronts or in aquatic locations where groundwork does not offer sufficient stability, and as such piles must be used to accommodate all lateral and vertical loading from both the weight of construction, and movement of the soft ground (ground settlement) over time.

The ground upon which the Lilla Bommen was constructed, composed of a clay sediment with a depth of 100m, was expected to shift at a rate 10-20 cm every 100 years. The process of ground settlement forms an inherent risk to the stability of any load from structures built on top of the area. As discussed within Mohd Jamaludin Md Noor's Soil Settlement and the Concept of Effective Stress and Shear Strength Interaction, inundation inherent to coastal and water side locations furthers the risks of foundational strength weakening. These factors prevalent to the water-front nature of the construction location of the Lilla Bommen, emphasize the importance of the pile-loading construction methods used for the structure. The 95m piles used at the Lilla Bommen marked a Swedish record for maximum pile load at the time, for the construction method in clay settlement.

==== Concrete plate squares ====
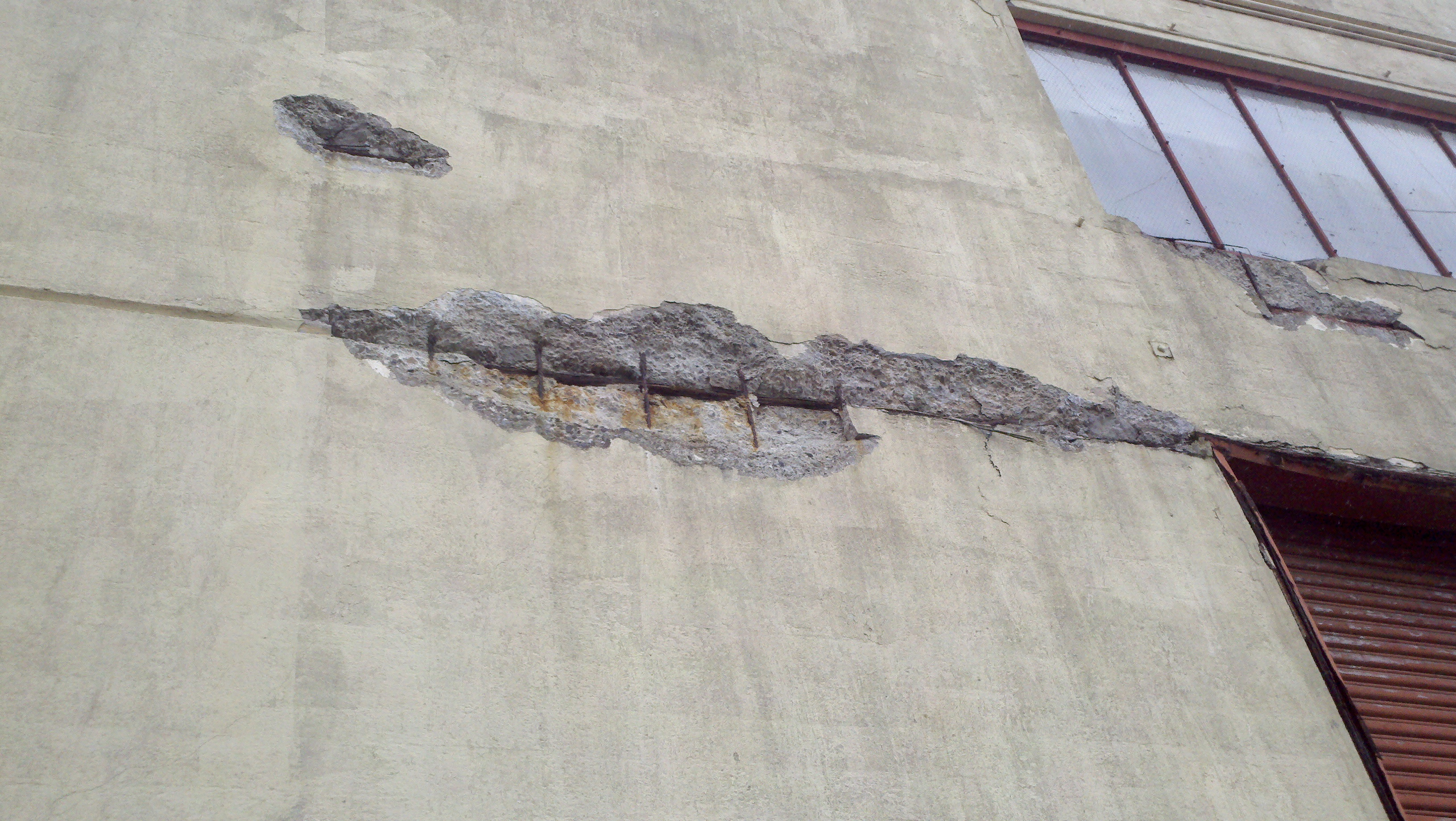
Spalling of concrete causes splitting from steel reinforcement

The foundational structure created in piling construction is also composed of a pre-stressed reinforced concrete plate squares. These covers implemented in the Lilla Bommen designed to be two metres thick and claimed to have used concrete in volume sufficient to have filled four Olympic sized swimming pools according to Skanska. The concrete covers both act as the stable surface for which construction can be based on, as well as also serving to protect piles beneath from corrosion and weathering damage. However, concrete covers built on top of piles are generally constructed with the minimum thickness possible to ensure prevention of weathering and corrosion damage, as spalling of steel-reinforced concrete begins to present a greater issue at larger thicknesses of concrete material. Spalling can be characterised as the formation of cracks and rust in steel-reinforced concrete, which results in severe cases, as concrete separating from the steel bar reinforcements within, as such posing major structural risks to any loads the material supports.

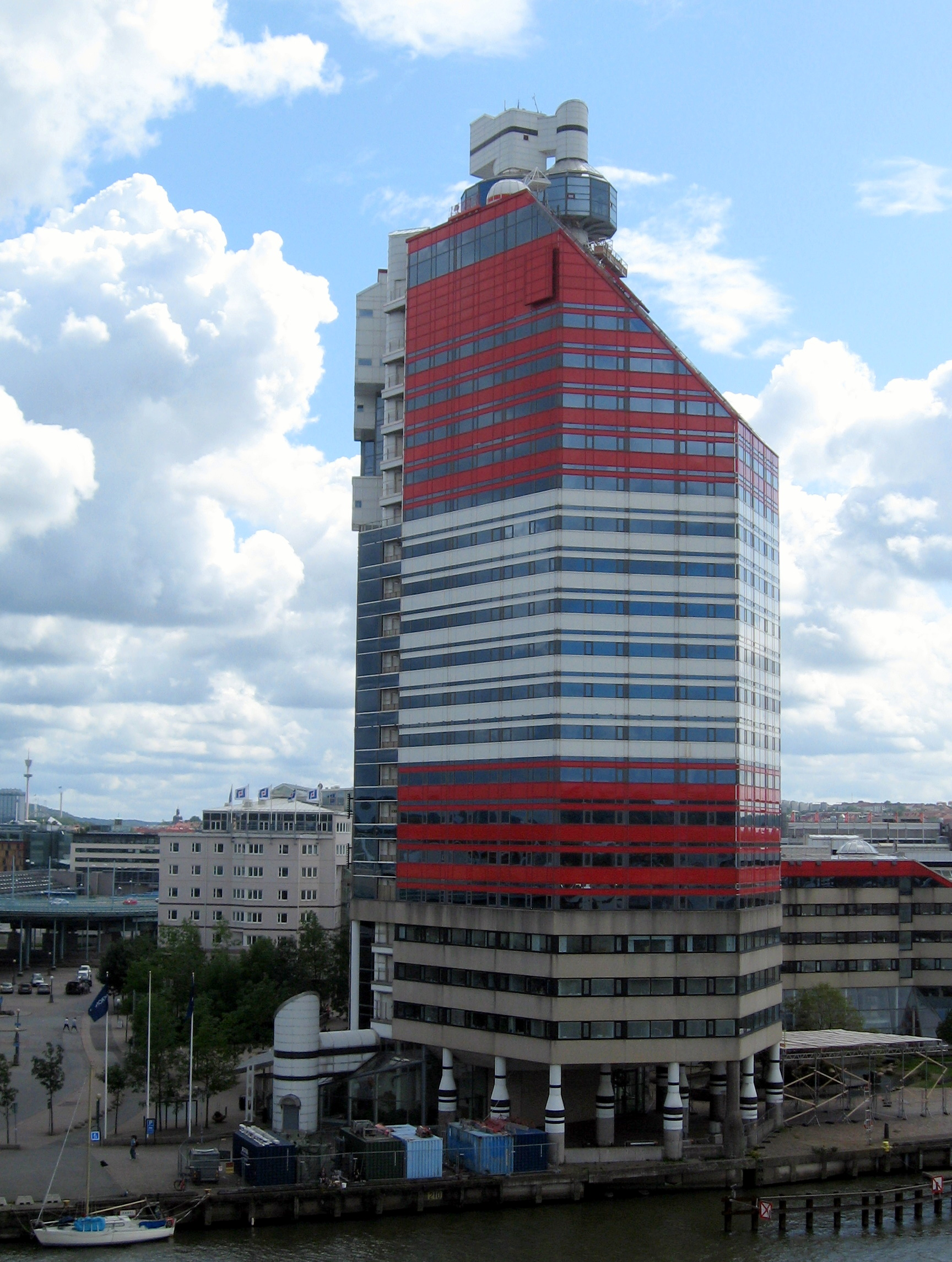
North facade

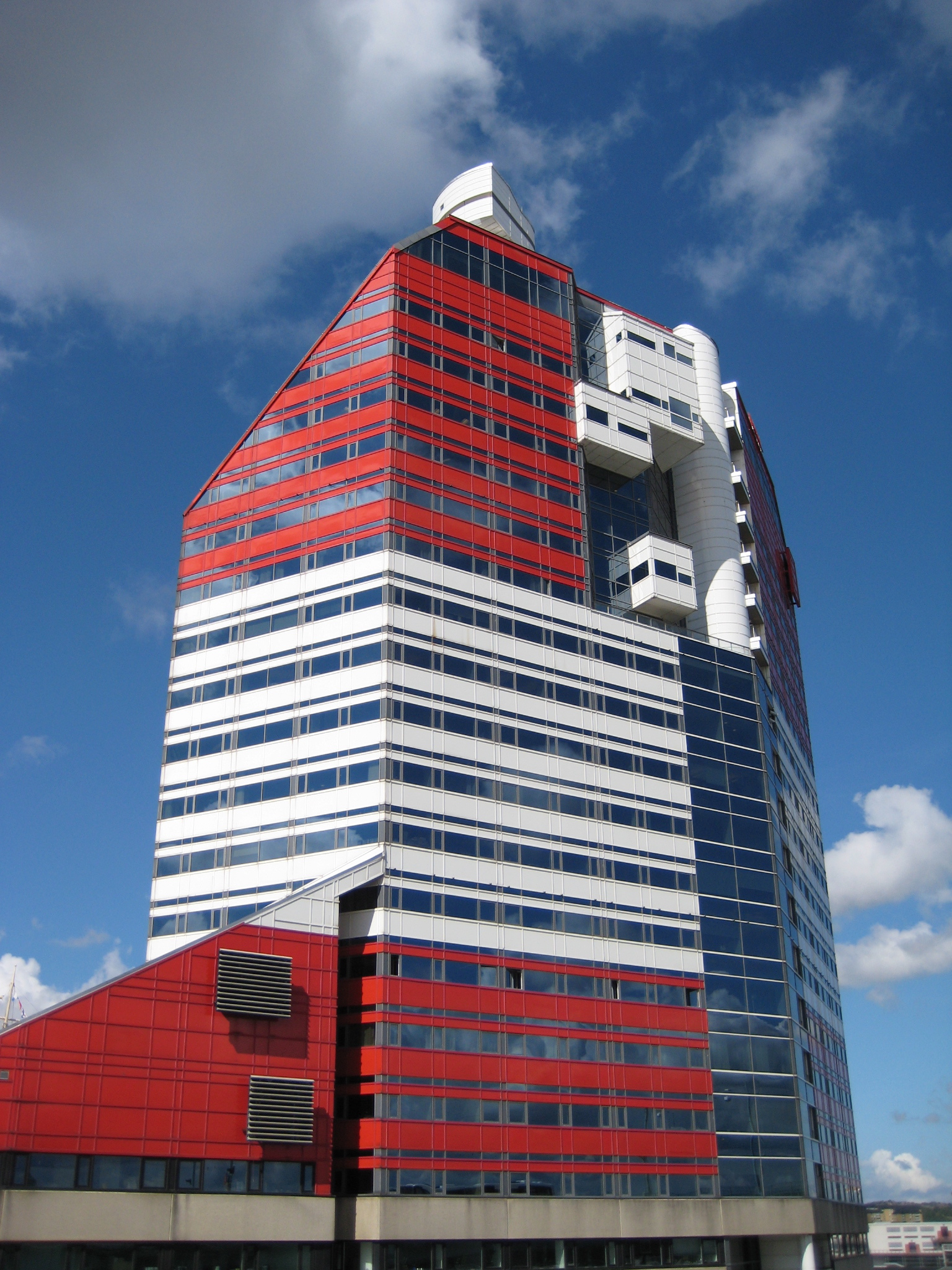
East facade

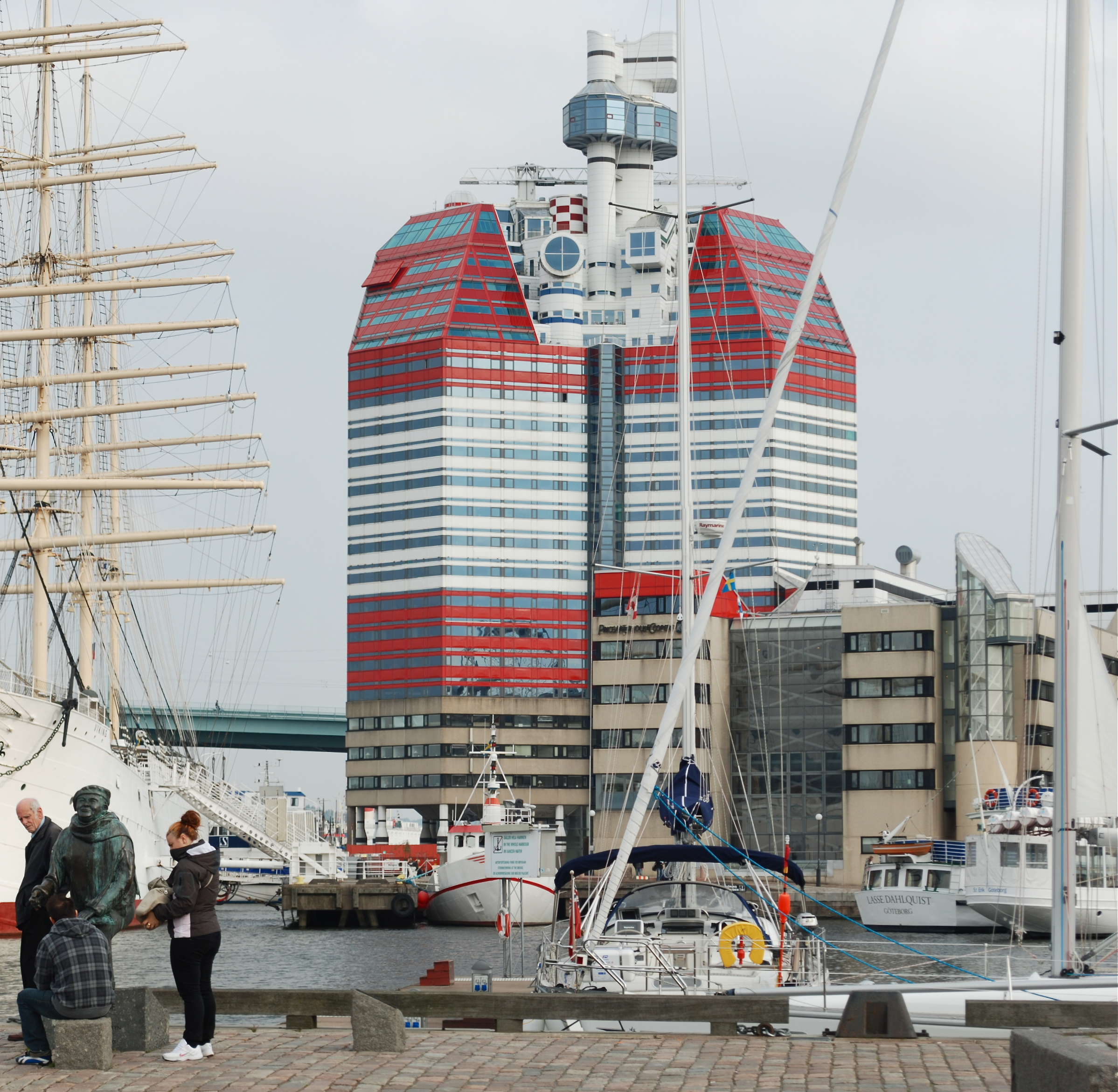
Lilla Bommen and the marina
