= Tumlehed rock painting =

Prehistoric rock art in Sweden

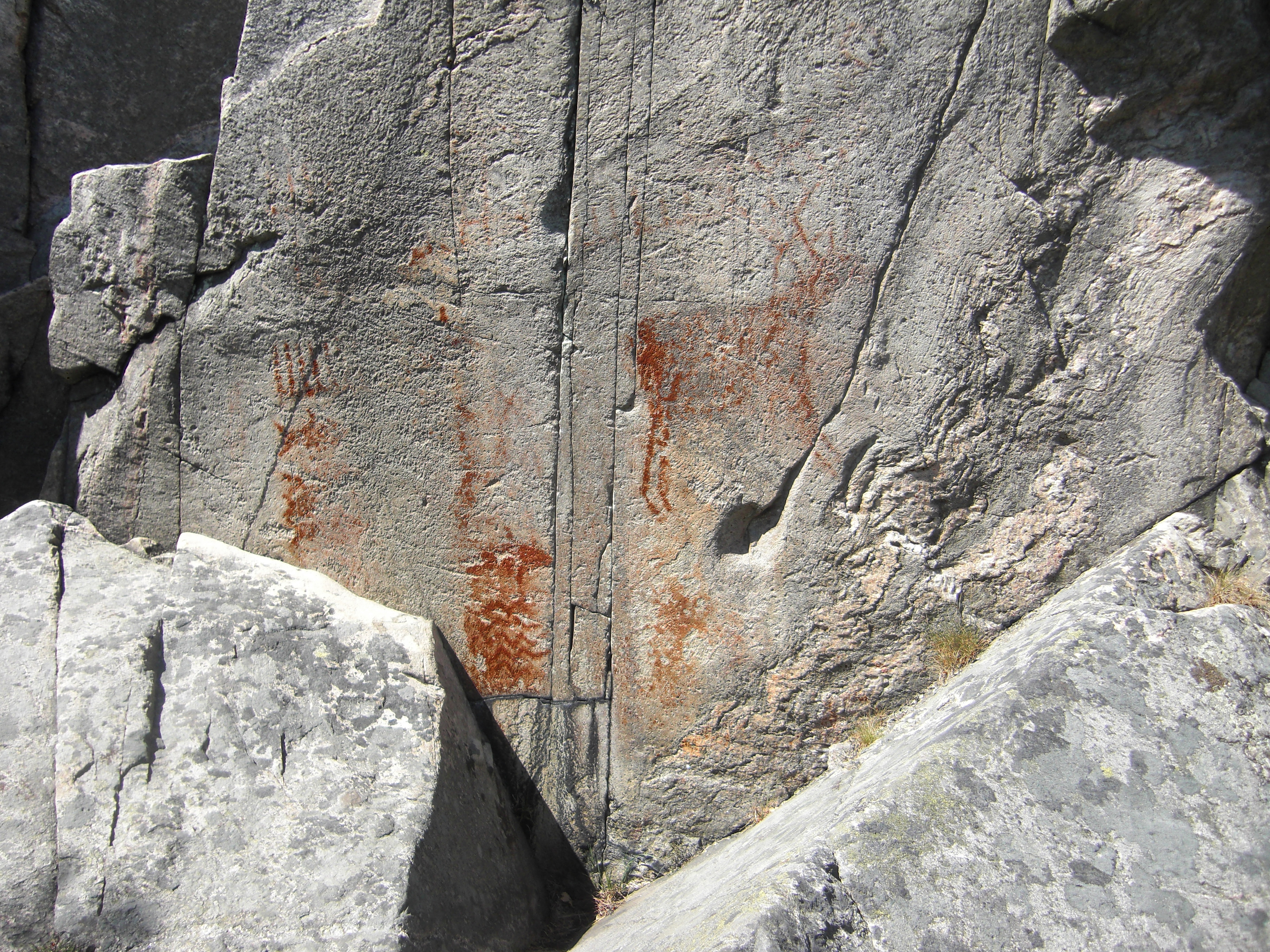
- The site in 2009
- Type: Rock art
- Location: Vastra Gotaland, Sweden

History
- Built: c. 3350 BC

Site notes
- Material: Ochre
- Discovered: 1974

The Tumlehed rock painting (Swedish: Hällmålningen i Tumlehed) is a prehistoric rock art pictograph site, located in Tumlehed on the island of Hisingen, Gothenburg Municipality, Sweden. It is the southernmost recorded rock painting in Sweden and one of few found in the western parts of the country, joined by a few additional ones in the same province.

== History ==
Discovered in 1974, its period of creation has been estimated to be from between 4200-2500 BCE. Most archaeologists hold it to be from the Mesolithic era, based on among other factors the possible hunter-gatherer symbolism, location in regards to historical sea levels, and neighbouring sites dating from that period. Its discovery contributed to shifting the academic understanding of the Scandinavian rock paintings, which previously had been found primarily in Norway, Finland, and northern Sweden. A minor excavation was carried out in 1985 of the area next to the painting, but no significant finds were made.

Situated on a steep cliff face, covering about 2 x 2 meters, it depicts a number of figures, among them four ships, four fish, a large deer, wave-like patterns, and some undetermined shapes. The painting was made with a mixture of red ochre and a binder which through bonding with the rock has survived the years. At the time of its making it would have been located on an island's shore, rather than on the slope of a hill as today.

== See also ==
- Rock Carvings in Tanum
