= Hisingsparken =

Park in Gothenburg, Sweden

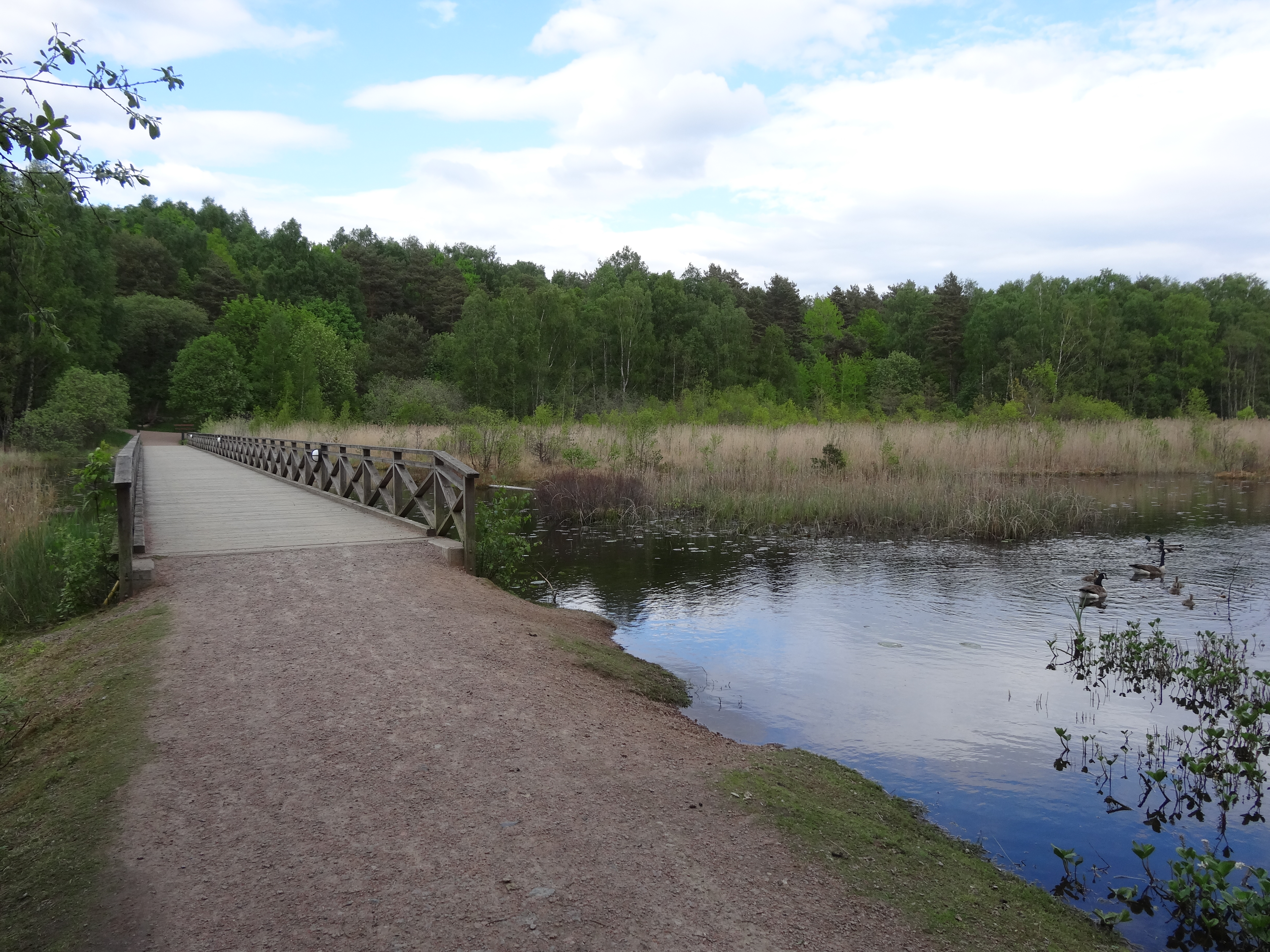
- Footbridge over Gunnestorps mosse, 2013
- Interactive map of Hisingsparken
- Type: Urban park
- Location: Hisingen, Gothenburg, Sweden
- Coordinates: 57°45′N 11°56′E
- Area: 320 hectare
- Created: 1980
- Operator: Gothenburg Municipality
- Open: Open all year

Hisingsparken (Swedish: [ˈhɪsɪŋsˌpɑrkɛn]) is the largest park area in Gothenburg, Sweden, covering approximately 320 hectares. The park is located on the island of Hisingen, within the districts of Slättadamm, Kärrdalen, Tuve, and Säve. It was officially established as a park in 1980.

The oldest section of Hisingsparken is S.A. Hedlunds park, developed in the late 19th century and named in 1928. Notable features include the wetland area Gunnestorps mosse and the artificial pond Slätta damm.

In the northern part of the park lies the Kättilsröd farm, a popular destination for children and families.

== Activities ==
Hisingsparken offers four jogging trails of varying lengths:

- Blue trail: 2.8 km
- Red trail: 5.4 km
- Yellow trail: 7.4 km
- Green trail: 11.1 km

== S.A. Hedlunds park ==
S.A. Hedlunds park is named after S.A. Hedlund, editor-in-chief and part-owner of the newspaper Göteborgs Handels- och Sjöfartstidning, and a notable cultural figure in Gothenburg. Around 1860, Hedlund created Slätta damm, which today is home to various bird species.

Near Hällskriftsgatan, a guestbook of carved signatures remains on a rock face – a record of visits to the Hedlund family. Notable names include Henrik Ibsen, Viktor Rydberg, Fredrika Bremer, Arctic explorer Otto Nordenskjöld, and balloonist Salomon August Andrée. According to legend, the stonemason was paid one krona per letter – a generous wage for the 19th century.
