= Hisingsbron =

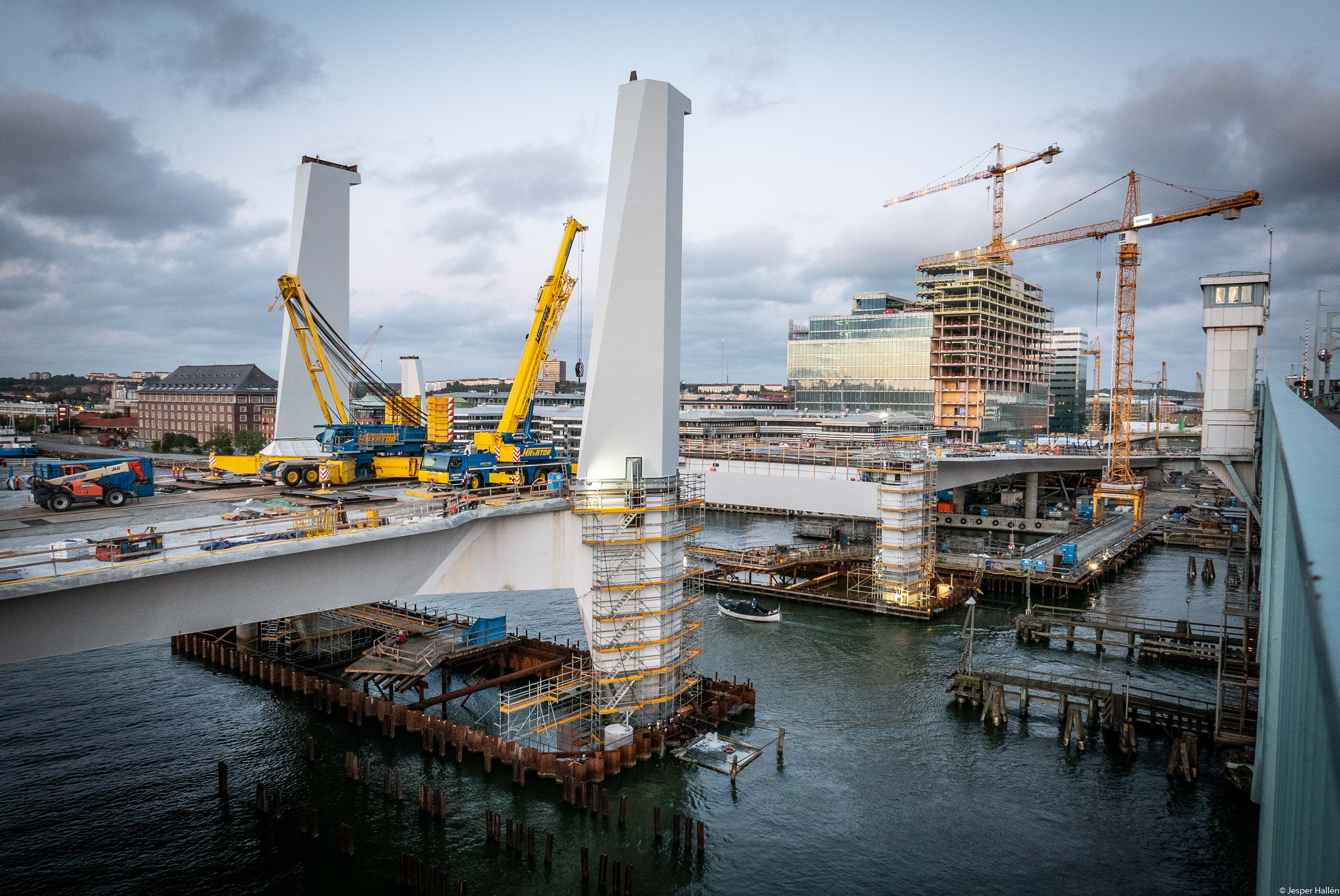
- Coordinates: 57.71489593133648°N 11.967886815955394°E
- Crosses: Göta älv
- Locale: Gothenburg, Sweden
- Preceded by: Götaälvbron

Characteristics
- Design: Vertical-lift bridge
- Total length: 440 m (1,440 ft)
- Width: 40 m (130 ft)
- Height: 12 m (39 ft)

History
- Construction start: 2017
- Construction end: 2021
- Opened: 9 May 2021
- Inaugurated: 5 September 2021

Hisingsbron (the Hisingen Bridge) is a vertical-lift bridge in central Gothenburg, Sweden, connecting the island of Hisingen to the mainland. The bridge was constructed between 2017 and 2021, replacing the Götaälvbro, and was inaugurated on 5 September 2021 by King Carl XVI Gustaf.

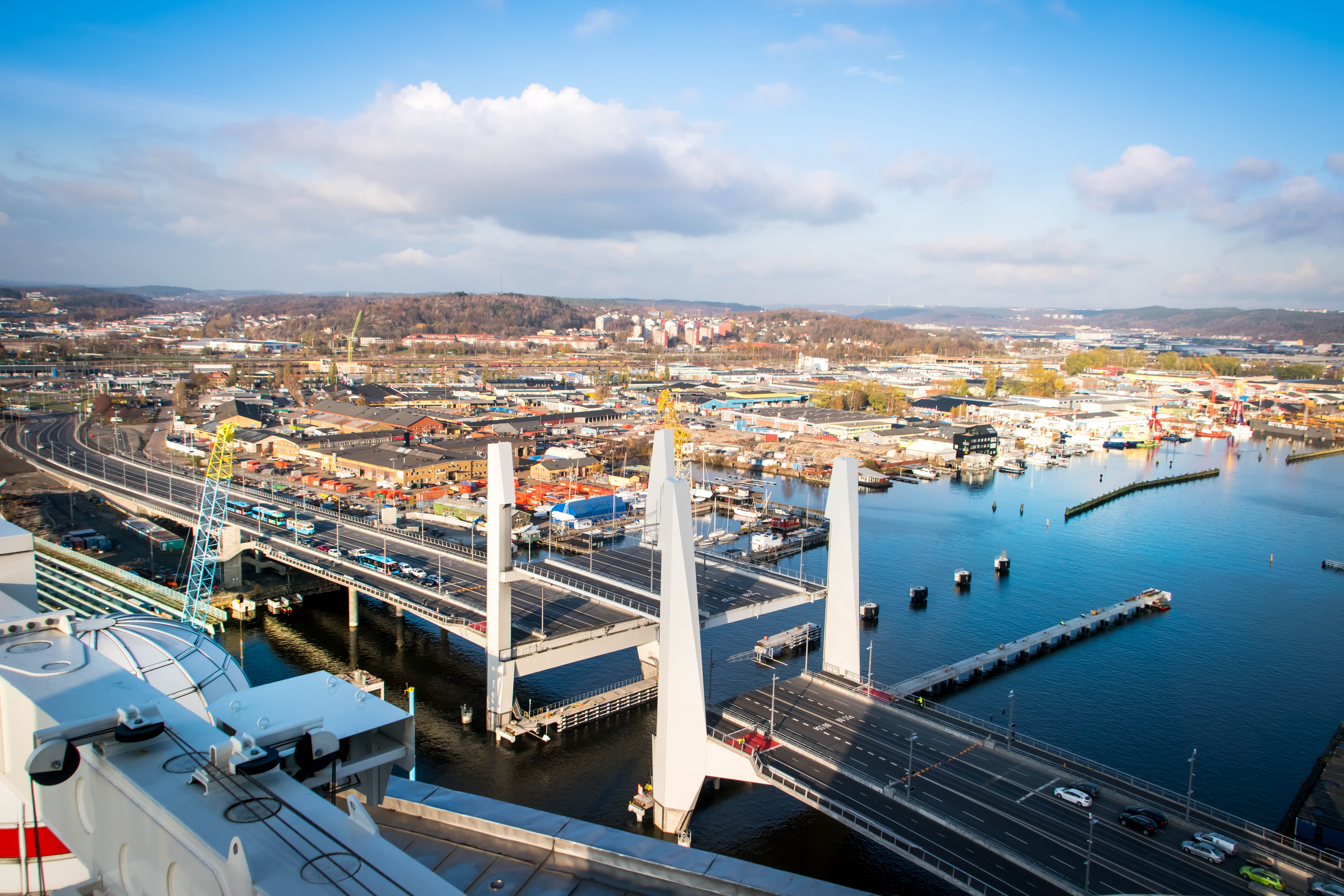
Hisingsbron raised to let tall boats pass under it
