= Tumlehed =

- Location within Västra Götaland Location within Sweden
- Coordinates: 57°44′N 11°43′E
- Country: Sweden
- Province: Bohuslän
- County: Västra Götaland County
- Municipality: Göteborg Municipality

Area
  - Total: 0.38 km^{2} (0.15 sq mi)

Population (31 December 2010)
  - Total: 475
  - Density: 1,248/km^{2} (3,230/sq mi)
- Time zone: UTC+1 (CET)
  - Summer (DST): UTC+2 (CEST)

Tumlehed is a locality situated in Gothenburg Municipality, Västra Götaland County, Sweden. It had 475 inhabitants in 2010.

The area has numerous different historical sites, among them the Tumlehed rock painting.
