= Tingstadstunneln =

Road tunnel in Sweden

Coordinates: 57°43′22″N 11°59′11″E

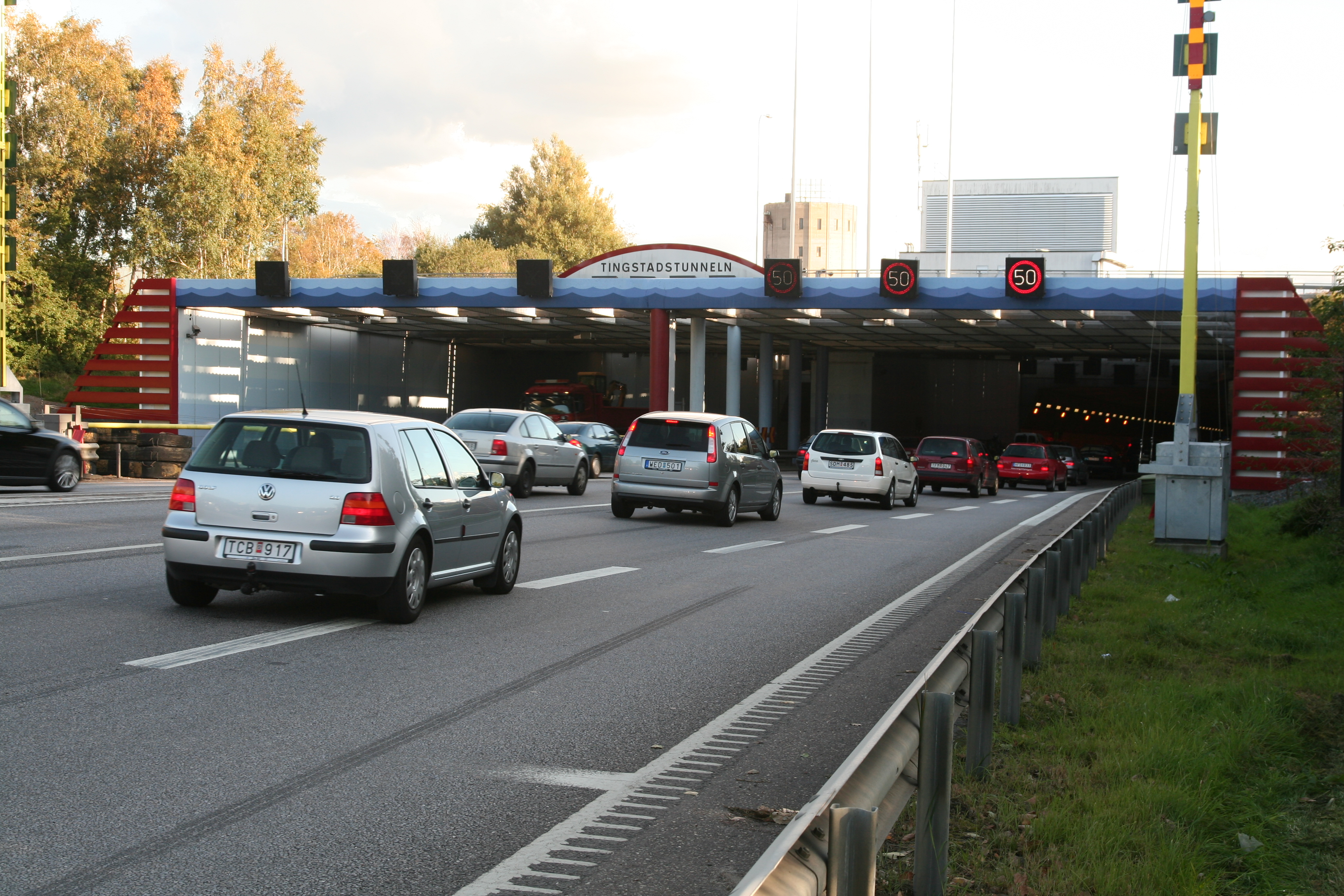
- Northern opening of Tingstadstunneln

Overview
- Location: Gothenburg

Operation
- Opened: 29 March 1968; 57 years ago

Technical
- Length: 454 metres (1,490 ft)

Tingstadstunneln (Tingstad Tunnel) is a motorway tunnel under the Göta älv, connecting Hisingen with mainland Gothenburg. The tunnel was constructed with two parallel immersed tubes with three lanes of traffic in each tube. It is part of the E6 route linking Norway with south-west Sweden.

Construction started on 17 January 1961, and the tunnel was inaugurated at 11:30 am on 29 March 1968.

The tunnel has the lowest motorway elevation in Sweden, at 15 m (49 ft) below sea level (nearby Götatunneln is lower and designed like a motorway but not signposted as one).

The tunnel had severe traffic congestion problems for several years. A new tunnel was for this reason built a little farther north, Marieholmstunneln, which was opened in 2020. The Tingstad Tunnel is after this mainly used for traffic along road E6, while Marieholmstunneln is used for those who want to diverge to the connecting roads E20, E45 or 155.

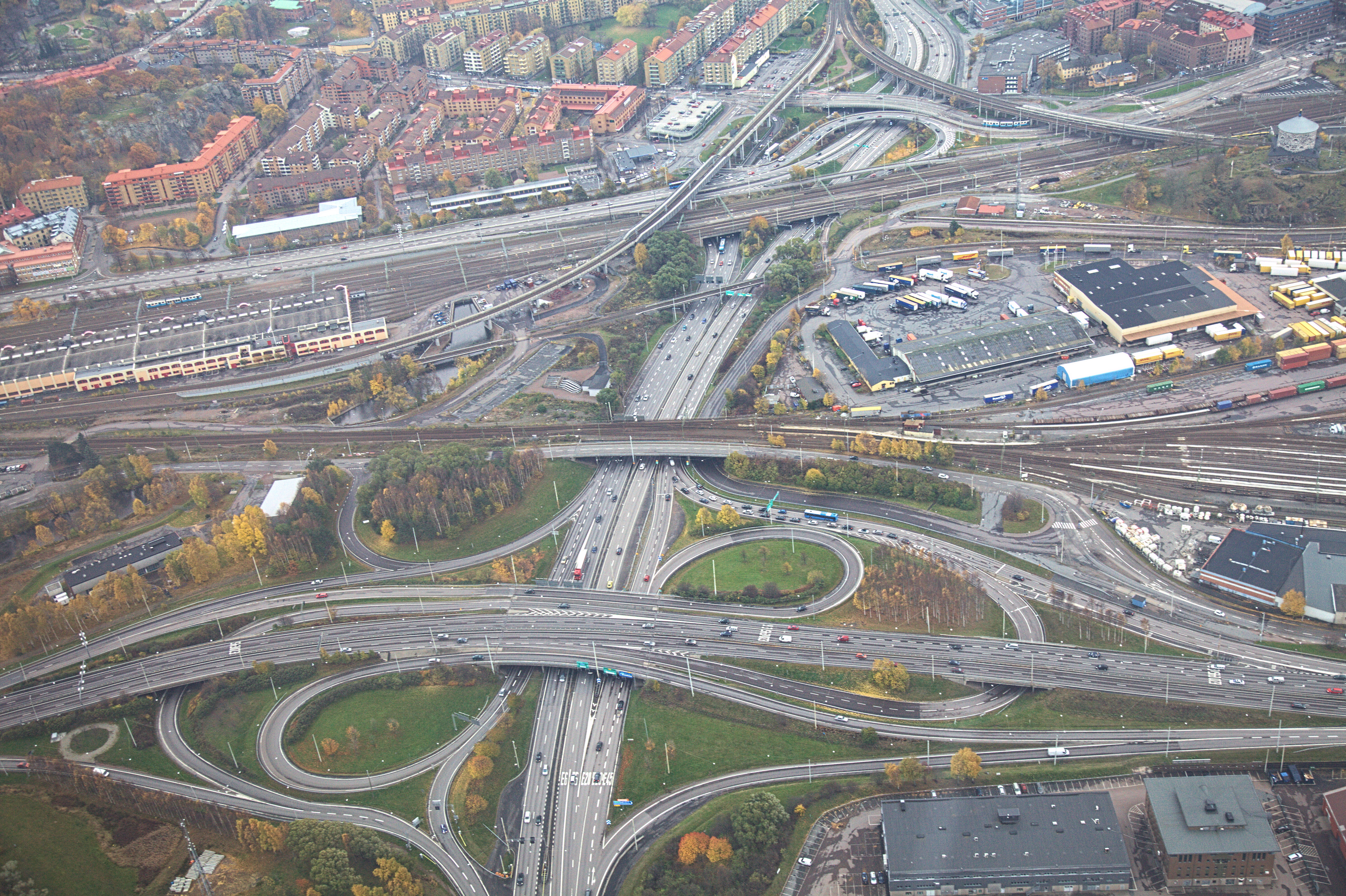
Traffic junctions south of the tunnel
