= Gasklockan, Gothenburg =

Demolished gasometer in Gothenburg, Sweden

Gasklockan
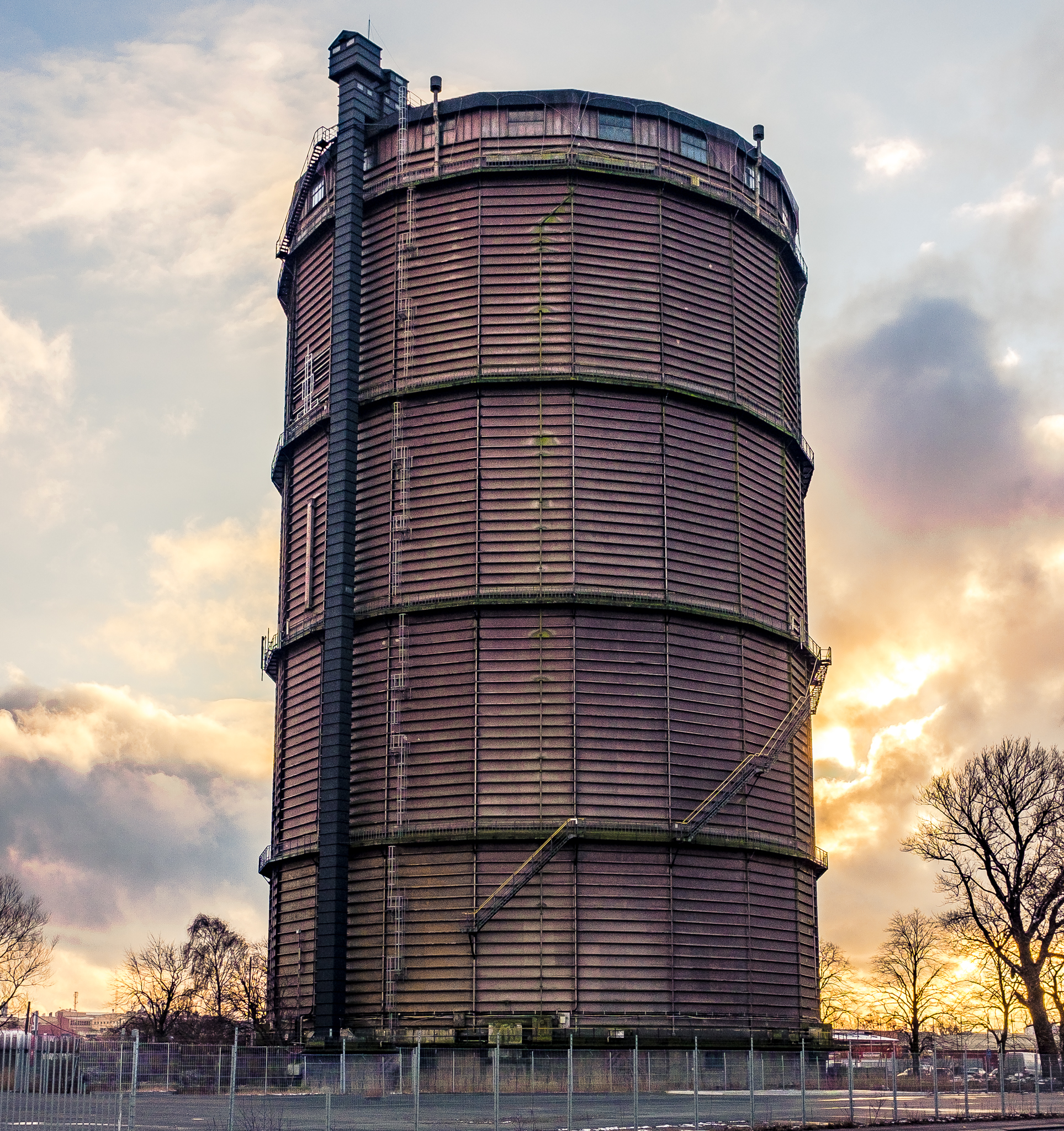
- Interactive map of the Gasklockan area

General information
- Status: Demolished
- Type: Gasometer
- Location: Gullbergsvass, Gothenburg, Sweden
- Coordinates: 57°43′04″N 11°58′55″E
- Opened: 7 November 1933
- Closed: 1993
- Demolished: 2017
- Owner: Göteborg Energi

Height
- Height: 81 m (266 ft)

Dimensions
- Diameter: 44.75 m (146.8 ft)
- Other dimensions: 100,000 m^{3} (3,500,000 ft^{3})

Gasklockan was a gasometer in Gothenburg, Sweden. It was 81 meters tall and stored up to 100,000 cubic meters of gas while in use between 1933 and 1993. After it was taken out of use several possible uses were suggested, most notably painting it like a can of Coca-Cola for the 1995 World Championships in Athletics. None of those plans were realized with the owners, Göteborg Energi applying for permission to demolish the building in 1999. The building was demolished in 2017 after many complications among them two endangered falcons nesting on top of the building and various processes being appealed.

== Original usage ==
Gasklockan entered usage in 1933 at the Gullbergsvass gasworks, which was at the time the largest gasworks in Sweden. It was in the shape of a 20 sided polygon with an internal diameter of 46 m (151 ft) and a height of 81 m (266 ft) with a gas capacity of 100,000 m^{3} (3,500,000 ft^{3}).

== Other uses ==
After Gasklockan stopped being used for storing gas in 1993 many other uses have been proposed. The most famous of these is The Coca-Cola Company's proposal to repaint it to look like a can of Coca-Cola for an ad campaign in connection to the 1995 World Championships in Athletics. The proposal was later withdrawn after complaints from locals. There have also been many other suggestions, among them an exhibition hall, climbing center, museum, hotel and dance stage.

While empty it was used for a few purposes including recording several music videos, including Glorious by Andreas Johnson, a sonic art installation by Åke Parmerud and Olle Niklasson, and housing telecommunications equipment.

Gasklockan deteriorated further over time making it more expensive to renovate or maintain with a maintenance cost of 100,000 Swedish kronor (US$10,000) each year in 2011 making demolition more attractive.

== Demolition ==
Plans to demolish Gasklockan were formalized in 1999 when Göteborg Energi applied for demolition permission with the county administrative board. The process continued for 14 more years before getting the green light in April 2013. By this time two endangered peregrine falcons had built a nest in the abandoned building requiring an exemption to the endangered species protection regulations. The application process was started immediately after getting approval and came to an end in December 2014 when the county granted the exemption conditioned on the falcons finding a new nest. A demolition company was contracted to perform the demolition, but the process was appealed by another demolition company taking part in the negotiations. The appeal was rejected by the administrative court in October 2015, but the decision was once again appealed to the administrative court of appeal in November 2015. Göteborg Energi decided to redo the entire bidding process for the contract in March 2016. Demolition was scheduled to begin early September 2016, but was delayed just days away. The demolition was rescheduled to start in February 2017, but if any further delays occurred the demolition would not be finished before the nesting season for the birds requiring it to be delayed until September. The demolition began in early 2017 and was performed by lifting the building using 20 jackscrews and removing the bottom most section. Using this process the building lost 2m height a day. It was finished before the March 15 deadline, but the falcons were present on the building while demolition was underway. The birds had been provided nesting boxes placed on alternative nesting sites.
