= Götatunneln =

Road tunnel in Sweden

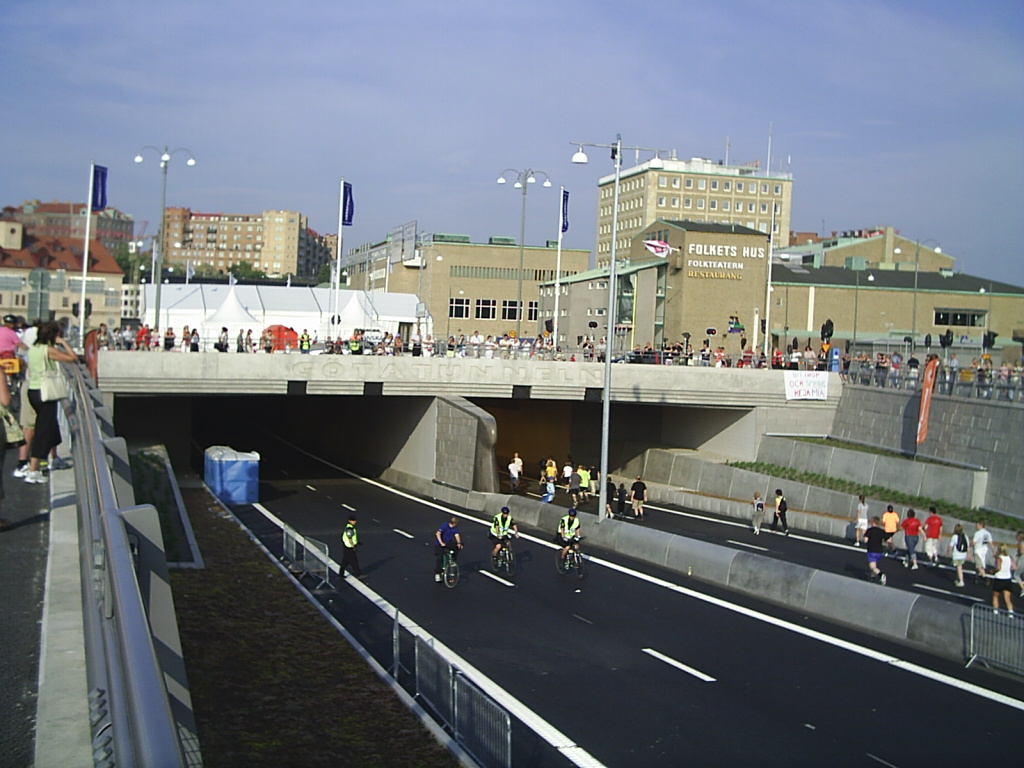
- Interactive map of Götatunneln

Overview
- Line: E45
- Location: Gothenburg, Sweden
- Coordinates: 57°42′40″N 011°58′03″E
- System: Road tunnel
- Start: Lilla Bommen
- End: Rosenlund

Operation
- Owner: Swedish Road Administration

Technical
- Track length: 1.6 km (0.99 mi)
- Max elevation: −4 m (−13 ft)
- Min elevation: −35 m (−115 ft)

The Götatunneln (Göta Tunnel) is a road tunnel between Järntorget and Lilla Bommen in central Gothenburg, Sweden. It is 1,600 metres (5,200 ft) long.

Construction began 2000 and it was opened for traffic June 2006. The tunnel is separated in two tubes, each carrying three lanes of traffic. The cost including road connection was 3 billion SEK.

The tunnel has made it possible for the city of Gothenburg to build new apartments and restaurants just by the waterfront of the southern shore of Göta älv, which was cut off by the E45 road before.
