= Hisingen =

Island of Sweden

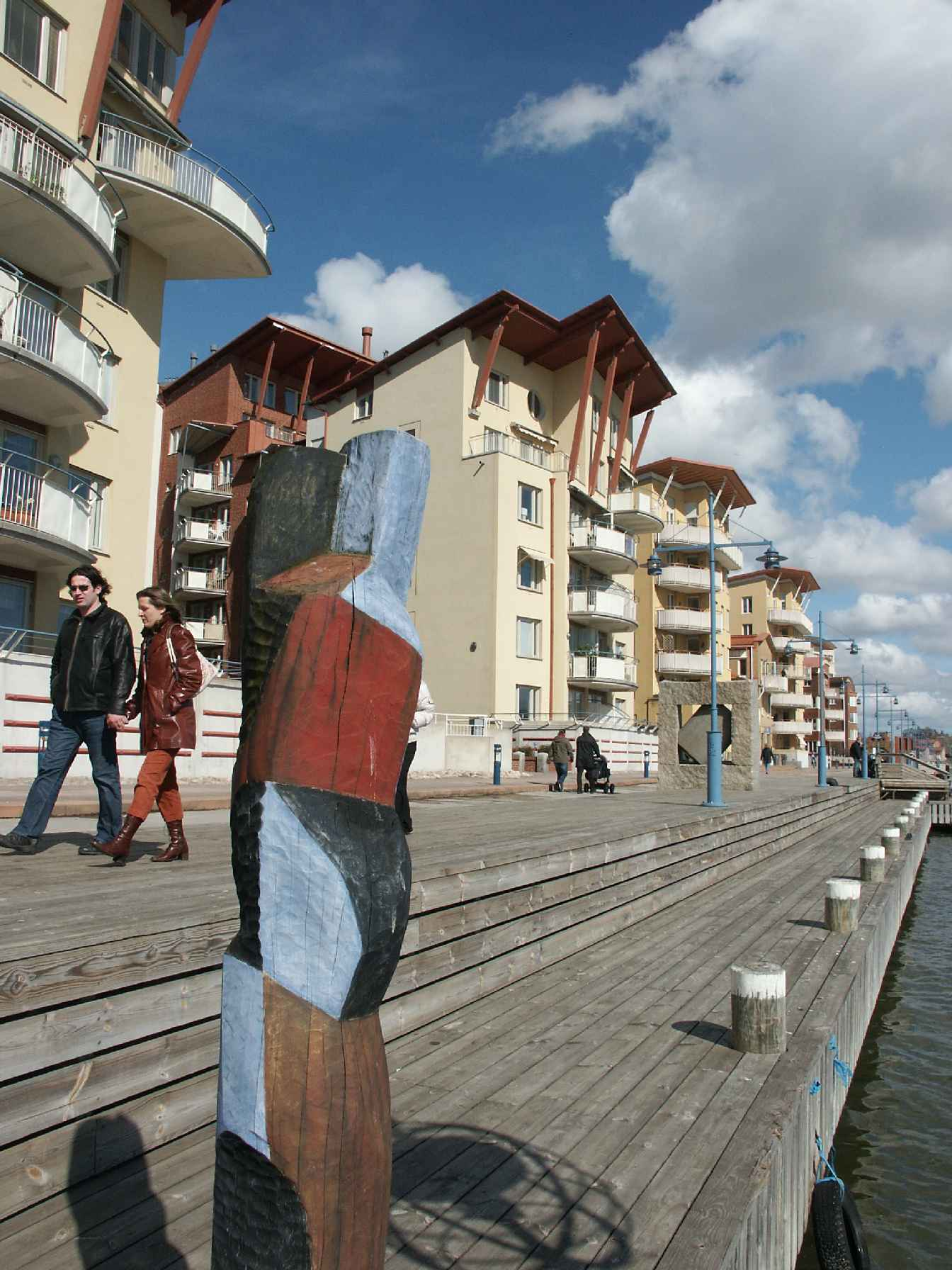
- Eriksberg on the northern bank of the Göta älv river where housing areas have replaced the shipyards.

- Location within Sweden

Geography
- Location: Kattegat
- Coordinates: 57°46′N 11°53′E
- Area: 198.84 km^{2} (76.77 sq mi)

Administration
- Sweden
- County: Västra Götaland County
- Municipality: Gothenburg Municipality

Demographics
- Population: 130,000
- Pop. density: 628.14/km^{2} (1626.88/sq mi)

Hisingen (Swedish pronunciation: [ˈhîːsɪŋɛn]) is the fifth-largest island of Sweden (after Gotland, Öland, Södertörn and Orust), with an area of 199 km^{2} (77 sq mi). It is a river island, formed by the split of the Göta Älv at Bohus, and is defined to the east and south by the main arm of that river, to the north by the smaller arm (known as the Nordre Älv), and to the west by the Kattegat. The southern part of Hisingen is extensively urbanised, representing the northern suburbs of the city of Gothenburg. The island is divided between the historical provinces of Västergötland and Bohuslän, but lies entirely within the modern county of Västra Götaland.

According to the 2023 census, the island of Hisingen in Sweden has a population of 176,047, making it the second most populous island in Sweden, after Södertörn but before Gotland.

For a brief, post-war period Hisingen was home to the largest shipbuilding centre in the world, but all three yards closed in 1979. Hisingen is home to both the Volvo Group and the now separate Volvo Cars. Most of the Port of Gothenburg, the Nordic countries' largest port, is also located on Hisingen.

== Etymology ==
The etymology of the name Hisingen is disputed. Hísing makes its first appearance in 13th century Icelandic sources; Hisingen is dated back to 1399.

The basic meaning of the prefix His- is "to split, cut off" and can be found in the placenames Hisøy and Hisön. Hence, the name can be interpreted as "the island cut off from the mainland".

== History ==
The Tumlehed rock painting and remains of ancient settlements prove that Hisingen was inhabited by the year 9000 BC.

During the Middle Ages, the Göta Älv represented the frontier between the Kingdom of Norway and the Kingdom of Sweden, with the river island of Hisingen being divided between the two realms. The division was not equal, with only the southern quarter of the island (comprising Lundy and Tuve parishes) belonging to Sweden while the remainder (Rödbo, Säfve, Backa, Björlanda and Torslanda parishes) was Norwegian.

It was on Hisingen that the first town with the name Gothenburg existed. It was founded by king Charles IX in 1607 on the southern shore of Hisingen, at Färjenäs. It was inhabited mostly by Dutch merchants, enticed to settle there by favourable economic conditions. However, the town was completely destroyed by the Danes in 1611, during the Kalmar War.

Under the 1658 Treaty of Roskilde, the Norwegian province of Bohuslän was ceded to Sweden, thereby uniting Hisingen under Swedish control, although the old border was preserved in the division between the districts of Västra Hisings härad (the formerly Norwegian area) and Östra Hisings härad.

The island was mostly farmland until the 19th century, when industrialization began and companies like Arendalsvarvet, Eriksberg, Götaverken and Lindholmen started operating there. For most of the 20th century, until the shipyard crisis in the 1970s, the island was the focus for Swedish shipbuilding.

The Volvo car manufacturer has its roots on Hisingen; it was there that their first factory was located and the first car, the Volvo ÖV 4, was produced in 1927. Today, the company still has its main office and production facilities on the island. The Volvo Museum is also located nearby.

Over the last 20 years, the northern bank of Göta älv has undergone major expansion. Residential areas, university buildings and high tech industry have largely replaced the shipyards.

== Geography ==
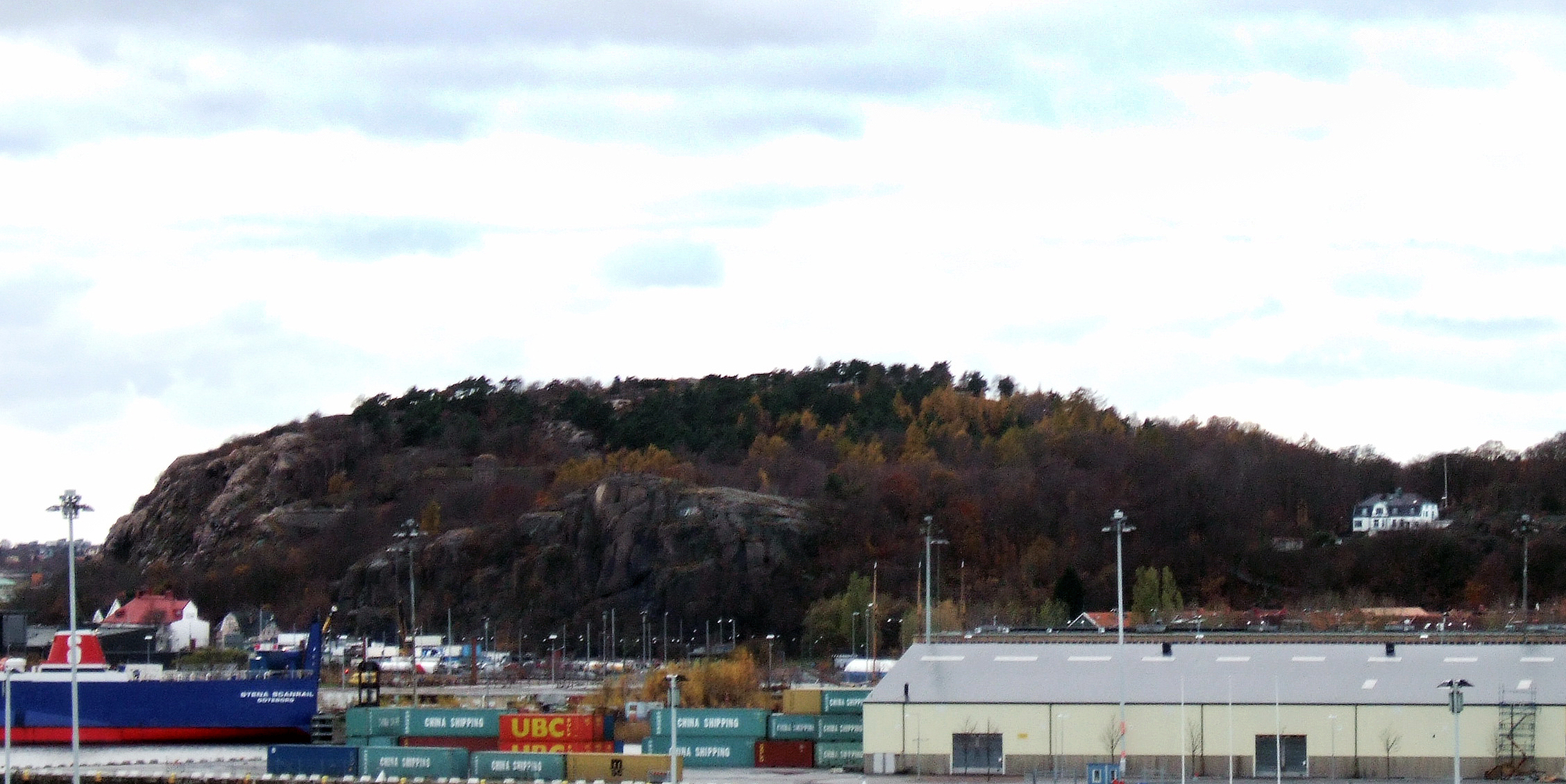
Ramberget as seen from the Göta älv Bridge.

The island has a diverse landscape with coasts, farms and forests. The biggest forest area is Hisingsparken, which is also the largest park in Gothenburg. Rya skog, a smaller forest and a nature reserve, is located in the south of Hisingen.

Ramberget, an 87 m hill, is a well-known landmark. It is part of Keiller's Park, which was established in 1908 and covers an area of over 31 hectares. From the top of the hill, which can be reached by car, there is a wide view of the whole city.

== Administration ==
All of the island belongs to Gothenburg Municipality. It is divided up into three boroughs:

- Norra Hisingen (Northern Hisingen)
- Västra Hisingen (Western Hisingen)
- Lundby

== Transport ==
The island is linked to the mainland by several bridges, including the Hisingen Bridge, the Älvsborg Bridge, and the Tingstadstunneln motorway tunnel (a second motorway tunnel is also planned). A number of bus routes, as well as tram lines 5, 6 10 and 13, connect the island to central Gothenburg.

Gothenburg City Airport (Gothenburg's second international airport after Landvetter) is located at Säve in the northern part of Hisingen.

== Ranking among Sweden's largest islands ==
In 2014 Statistics Sweden declared Hisingen the country's fifth largest island, after deciding that the water surrounding an island may include artificial canals. It has been noted that under this definition, all of Götaland would be the country's largest island, rendering Hisingen the sixth largest.

== See also ==
- Port of Gothenburg
