= Lilla Bommen =

Part of Gothenburg, Sweden

Coordinates: 57°42′41″N 11°57′56″E

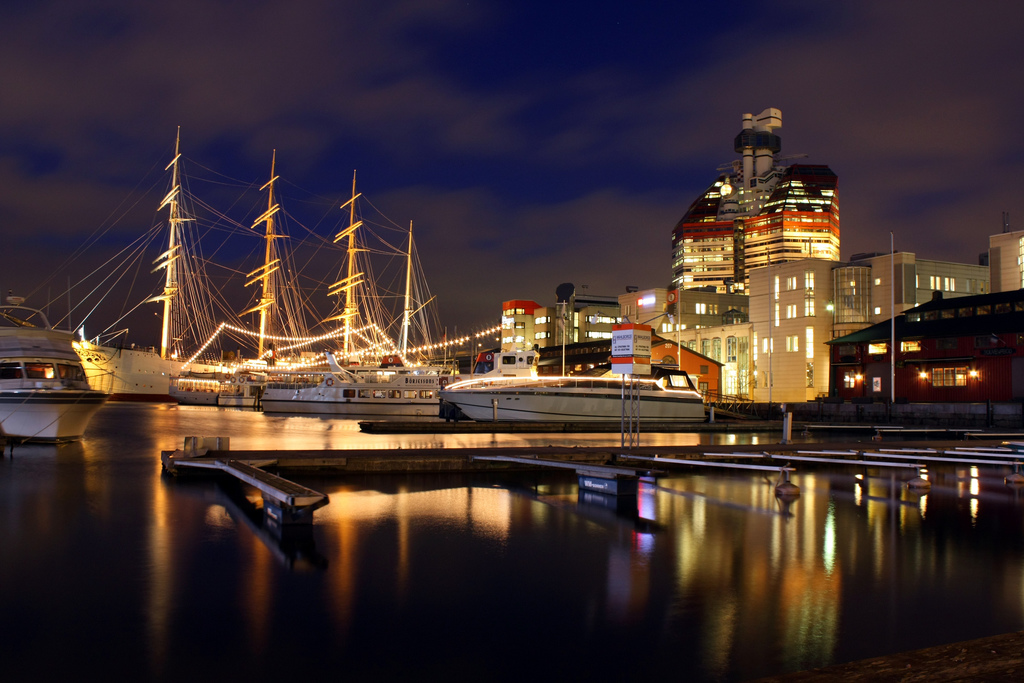
Lilla Bommen by night in 2009

Lilla Bommen is a part of Gothenburg harbor used for visiting boats and also the name given to the land surrounding the harbor. The eponymous building along with The Gothenburg Opera house and the barque Viking are all located at Lilla Bommen.

== Etymology ==
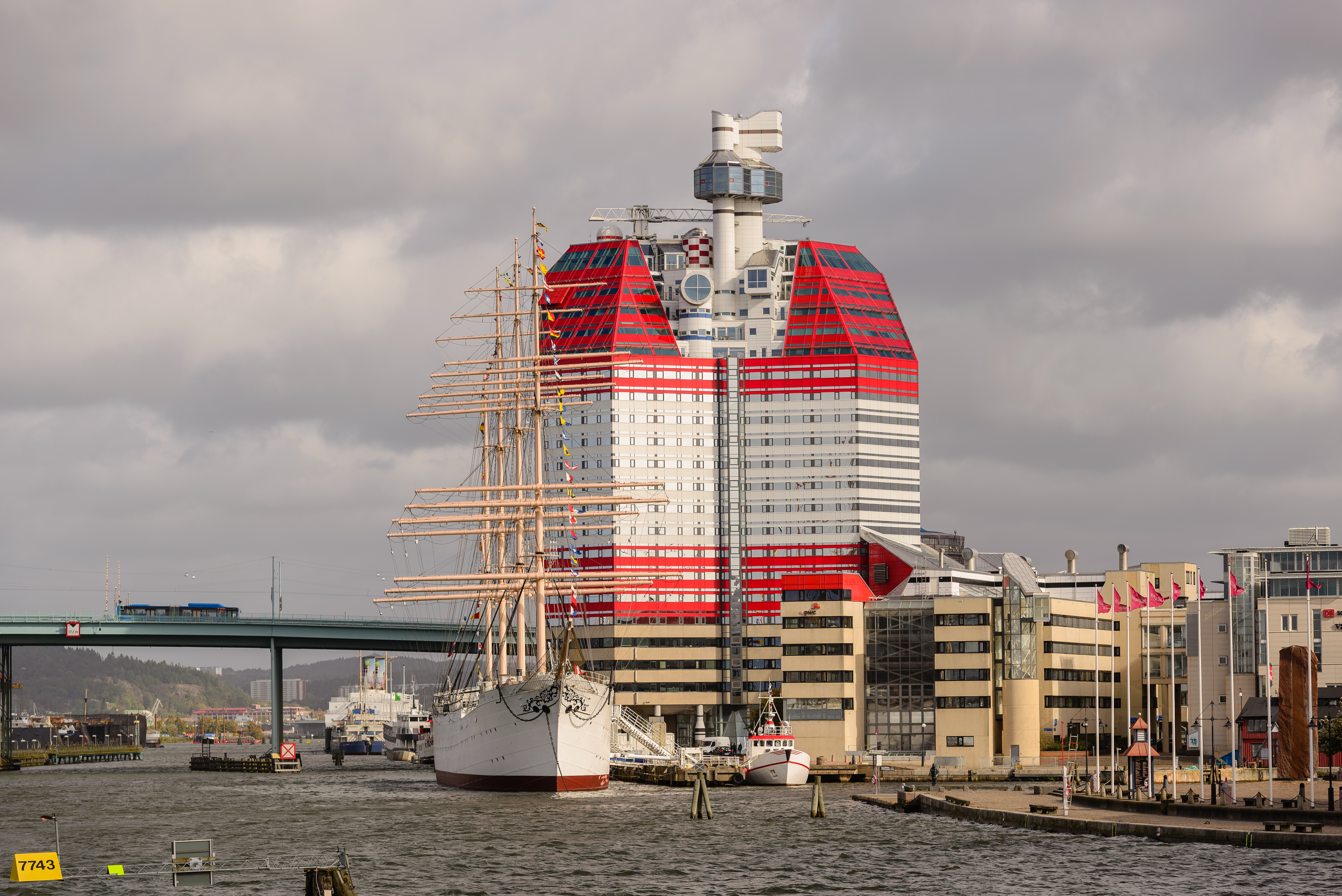
Lilla Bommen as seen from Göta älv

The names Lilla Bommen ("The Small Boom") and Stora Bommen ("The Large Boom"), which is slightly further to the west along the Göta älv, come from the booms that previously blocked the way for boats going in and out of the Gothenburg canals and where a government tax was collected. The harbor was located between two bastions: the Gustavus Primus at the present-day opera house, and the S:tus Ericus west of the Lilla Bommen high-rise.

== History ==
Completed in 1860, with a quay 525 m (1,722 ft) and 3.5 m (11 ft) deep, Lilla Bommen soon became the main port in Gothenburg for canal boats, and domestic shipping. It was the starting point for cargo and passenger ships going up the Göta älv, through the Göta Canal, then across lakes Vänern and Vättern to Stockholm and Norrköping.

Demolition of the old gunpowder house at Lilla Bommen started on 7 October 1862. In 1899, a station house was built at Lilla Bommen at the end of the line for the Västergötland–Göteborgs Järnvägar ("Västra Götaland–Gothenburg Railway").

In 1936, the then Östra Hamnkanalen ("East Harbor Canal"), running from Lilla Bommen between the two lanes of the Östra Hamngatan ("East Harbor Street") and ending at Brunnsparken was filled in, then in 1937–38, a third of the Lilla Bommen harbor (the inner part) was also filled in. An option considered at the time was to fill in the entire dock and move shipping to the Gullberg quay northeast of the dock.

== Geography ==
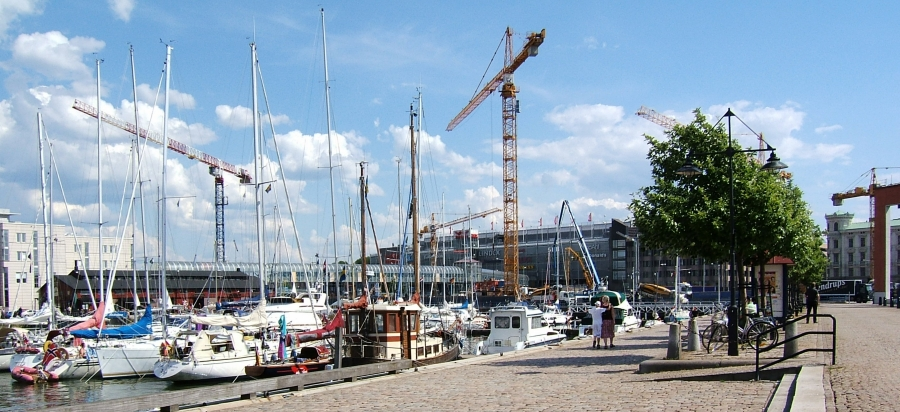
The marina at Lilla Bommen in Gothenburg

Lilla Bommen is a part of the Gothenburg harbor on the shore of the Göta älv. Said to have been constructed in the 1640s, as of 2015 it is used as a marina, owned and operated by the Gothenburg Municipality through the Liseberg company, for visiting pleasure craft. Lilla Bommen is also the name of the land surrounding the harbor. On the west side of the dock is The Gothenburg Opera house, completed in 1994 while on the east is an office complex that includes a high-rise with the same name as the area, the Lilla Bommen. The building is locally known as "The Lipstick" or "The Skanska Skyscraper". The barque Viking is moored between the dock and the high-rise.

== Lilla Bommen Bridge ==
The former Lilla Bommen Bridge crossed the Östra Hamnkanalen at its outlet in the Lilla Bommen harbor. It connected the Kanaltorget ("Canal Square") with the S:t Eriks Torg ("S:t Eric's Square"). It was a wide and heavily trafficked bridge with railway tracks. It became part of the landfill when the canal was filled in.

== Lilla Bommen Square ==
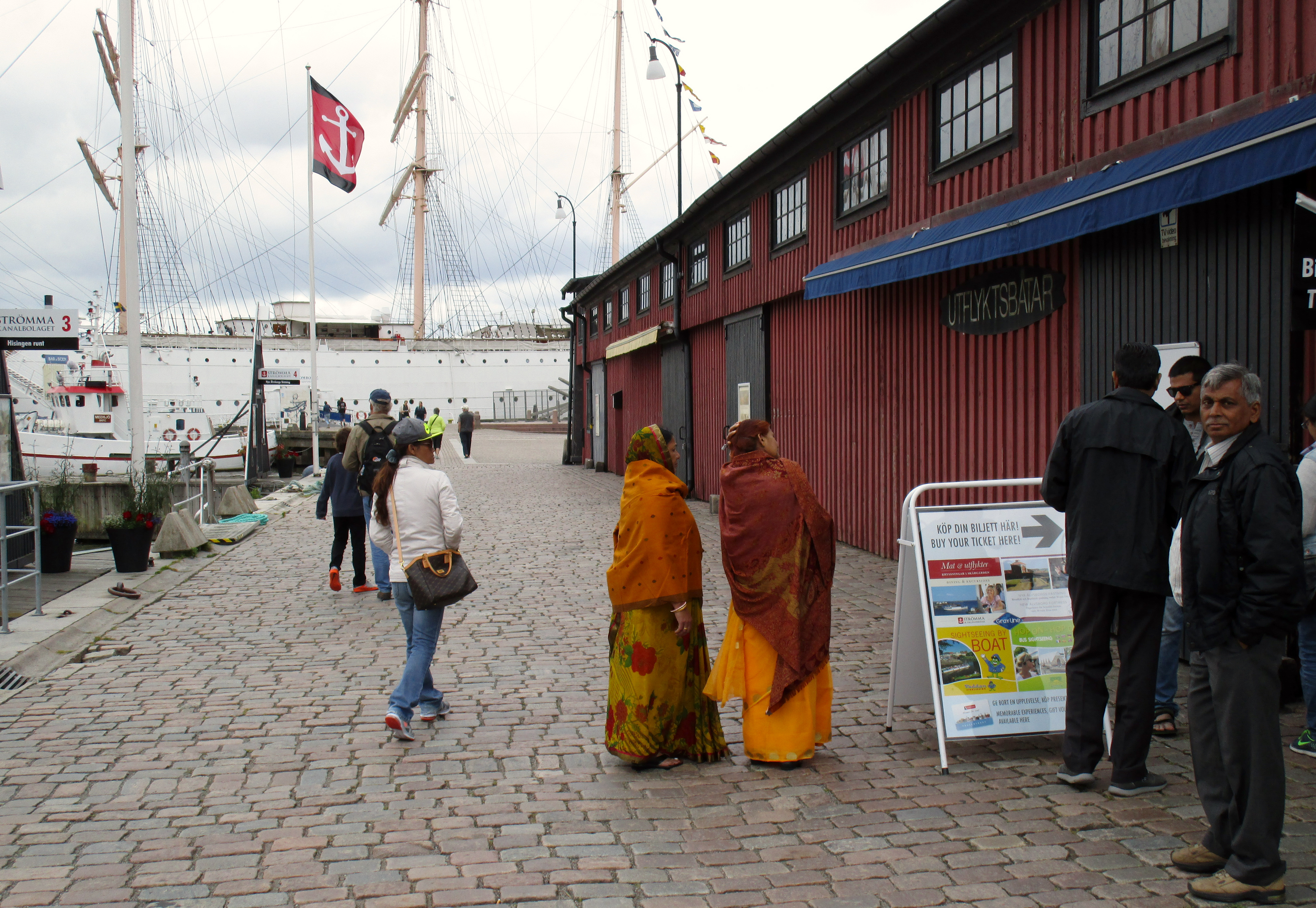
West part of the Lilla Bommen square

East of the harbor is Lilla Bommen Square, which was named in 1883. The square was created in 1878 when part of the Vallgraven ("Moat"), from Lilla Bommen harbor to the Fattighusån was filled in to create an extended land area northeast of the harbor. Another part of Lilla Bommen outside the Vallgraven was the Stadstjänareholmen. This area was leased by master carpenter Hultman, who gave his name to Hultmans Holme ("Hultman's Islet") a district in modern Gothenburg.

== Göta boat ==
In July 2001, when digging was done at S:t Eriksgatan in Lilla Bommen, in connection to the construction of the Götatunneln, a boat wreck from the mid 1700s was found. It was designated the Götabåten ("Göta Boat"). The boat was buried under more than 3 m (9.8 ft) of heavy landfill, at a depth that is about 0.6 m (2.0 ft) below the current water level of the Göta älv. What was left of the boat was a 10 m × 3 m (32.8 ft × 9.8 ft) section of the hull, consisting of the keel, the sternpost and parts of the hull sides. The boat was mainly made from oak and pine, and was estimated to have been approximately 12 m (39 ft) long.

== Göta Elf accident ==
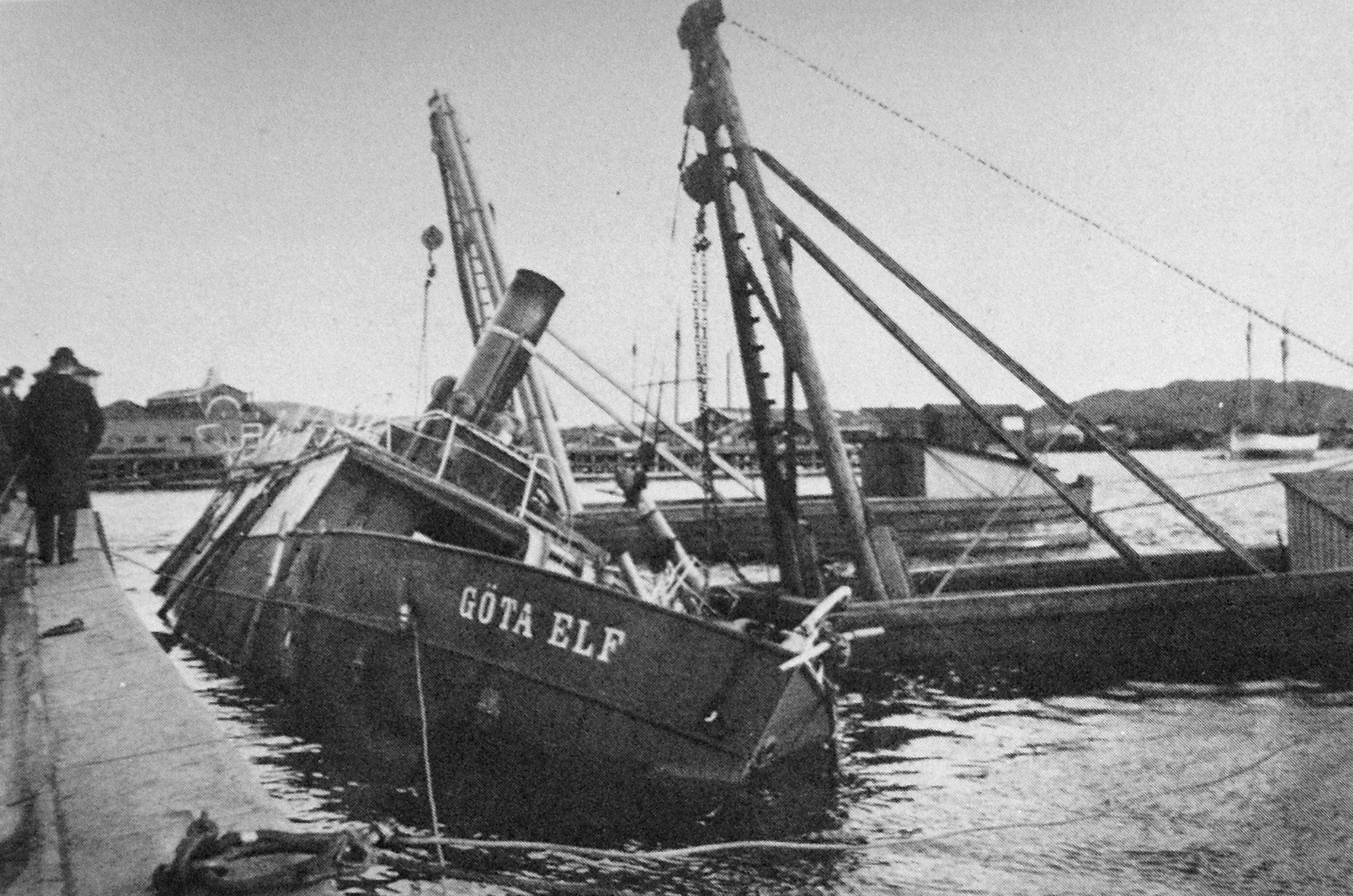
The salvage of Göta Elf in Lilla Bommen, 1908

On 15 April 1908, the steamboat Göta Elf, capsized and sank in the Lilla Bommen harbor. The steamer was fully loaded with cargo and passengers, twentysix people died and the accident was widely publicized in national press. The somewhat gruesome salvage operation was filmed by photographer Charles Magnusson and was shown, uncensored, as part of one of Sweden's first newsreels. The boat was built in 1884 at Thorskogs wharf and operated the route Gothenburg–Lilla Edet–Trollhättan.

== P-Arken ship ==
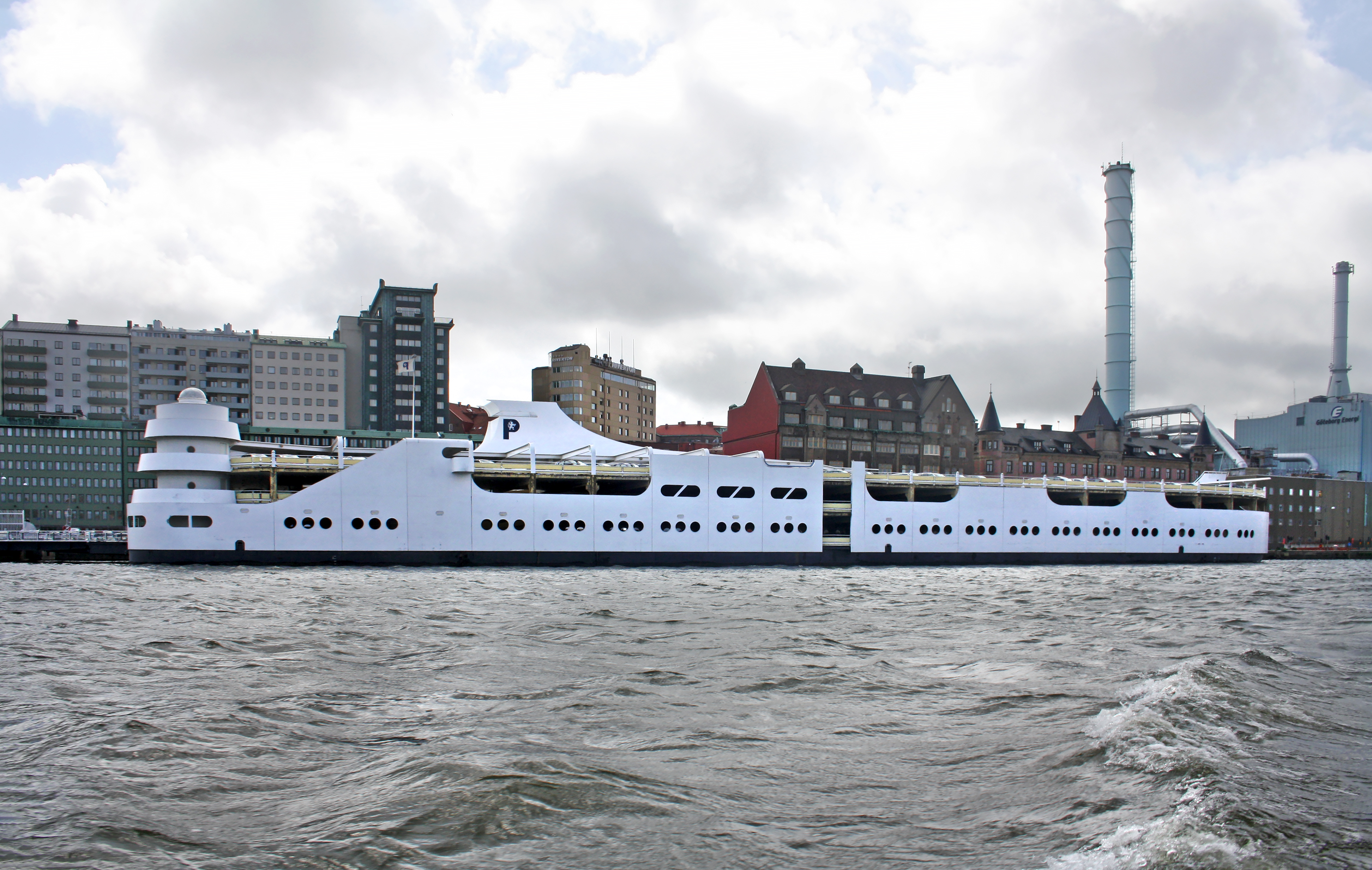
P-Arken as seen from water

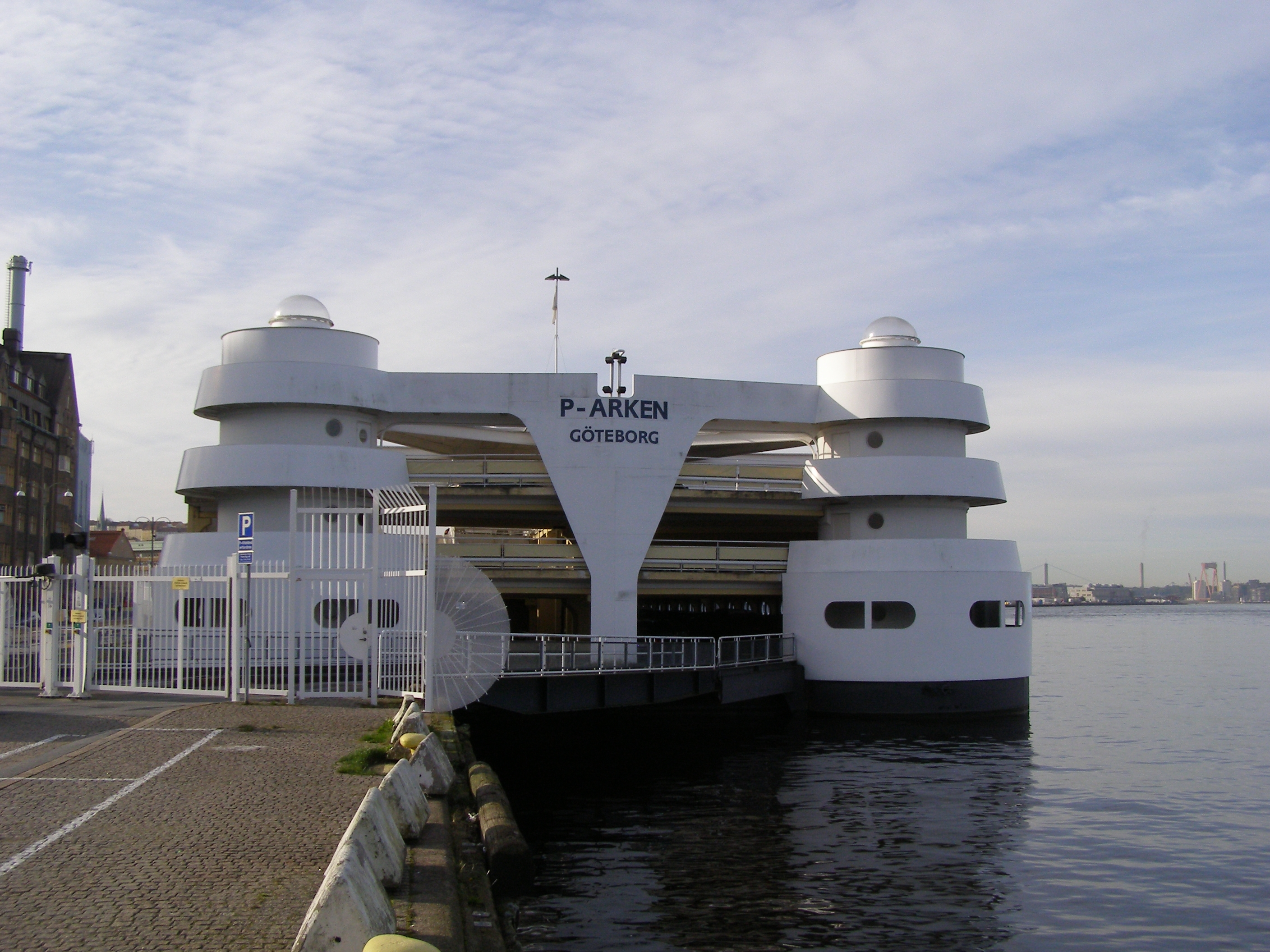
P-Arken as seen from land

In 1991, a 1975 marine vessel was transformed into a floating pontoon multistorey car parking facility. The ship was given the new name P-Arken and it is permanently moored in Lilla Bommen near Skeppsbron.
