= Timeline of Gothenburg =

The following is a timeline of the history of the municipality of Gothenburg, Sweden.

== Prior to 19th century ==
- 1619 - Gothenburg founded by Gustavus Adolphus.
- 1621
  - Town chartered.
  - Gothenburg stave church completed.
- 1633 - Gothenburg Cathedral consecrated.
- 1650 - Printing press in operation.
- 1672 - Gothenburg Town Hall built.
- 1680 - Gothenburg and Bohus County established.
- 1731 - Swedish East India Company headquartered in Gothenburg.
- 1761 - Göteborgs glasbruk (glassworks) begins operating.
- 1762 - East India House (Gothenburg) built.
- 1773 - The Vauxhall pleasure gardens is inaugurated.
- 1778 - Royal Society of Sciences and Letters in Gothenburg active.
- 1779 - Comediehuset, the first theater in the city, is established.
- 1786 - Societetsskolan, the first secondary school open to females, is founded.
- 1797 - Stay of Polish national hero Tadeusz Kościuszko in the city following the Partitions of Poland (see also Poland–Sweden relations).
- 1800 - Population: 12,804.

== 19th century ==
- 1802 - 22 December: Fire.
- 1807 - Fortifications of Gothenburg demolished.
- 1812 - Hotel Götakällare built.
- 1813 - Fire.
- 1815 - Fruntimmersföreningens flickskola is founded.
- 1816 - Segerlindska teatern is founded.
- 1826 - Commercial college founded.
- 1829 - Chalmers industrial school founded.
- 1832
  - Göta Canal opens.
  - Göteborgs Handels- och Sjöfartstidning newspaper begins publication.
- 1833 - Kjellbergska flickskolan is founded.
- 1840 - Population: 21,558.
- 1843 - Gumperts Bookshop in business.
- 1849 - Bourse (Gothenburg) built.
- 1850
  - Eriksbergs Mekaniska Verkstad (shipbuilder) in business.
  - Population: 26,084.
- 1851 - Lindholmens varv (shipyard) begins operating.
- 1854 - Statue of Gustavus Adolphus erected in the Stortorget.
- 1858
  - Gothenburg Central Station opens.
  - Göteborgs-Posten newspaper begins publication.
- 1859 - Stora Teatern is founded.
- 1860
  - Royal Gothenburg Yacht Club founded.
  - Population: 37,043.
- 1861 - Göteborg City Museum and Göteborgs folkbibliotek (library) established.
- 1864 - Aron Jonason photo studio active.
- 1865 - Population: 43,346.

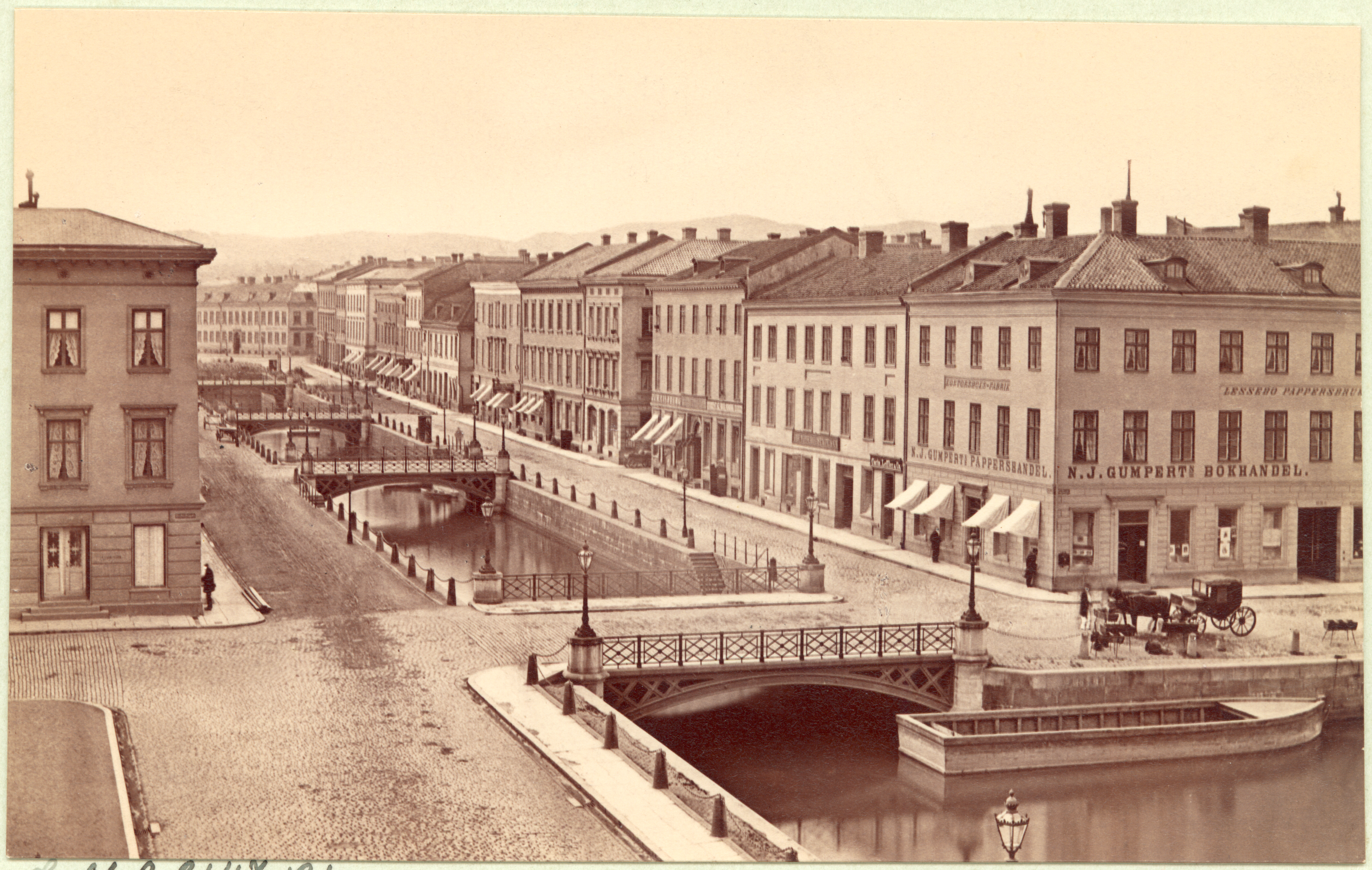
Gothenburg in the 1870s

- 1870 - Bräutigams cafe in business.
- 1871 - Göteborgs folkbank (bank) established.
- 1874 - Henriksberg in business.
- 1882 - Wettergrens bookshop in business.
- 1884 - Foundation of the Gothenburg's Women's Association and the local women's movement.
- 1886 - Hartelius bookshop in business.
- 1888 - Göteborgs Aftonblad newspaper begins publication.
- 1892 - Population: 107,965.
- 1894 - Hotel Eggers in business.
- 1896 - Göteborgs Morgonpost (newspaper) begins publication.
- 1897 - Göteborgs handelsbank (bank) founded.
- 1899
  - Illustrated Hvar 8 dag magazine begins publication.
  - Grand Hotel Haglund in business.
- 1900
  - City Library of Gothenburg built.
  - Statue of John Ericsson erected in Kungsportsavenyen.
  - Population: 130,619.

== 20th century ==
=== 1900s-1940s ===
- 1902
  - Göteborgs-Tidningen newspaper begins publication.
  - Göteborgs GK (golfing club) formed.
- 1903 - Säröbanan (railway) begins operating.
- 1904 - IFK Göteborg (football club) formed.
- 1905 - Gothenburg Symphony Orchestra formed.
- 1908 - Cosmorama, Gothenburg cinema in business.
- 1909 - Population: 163,957.

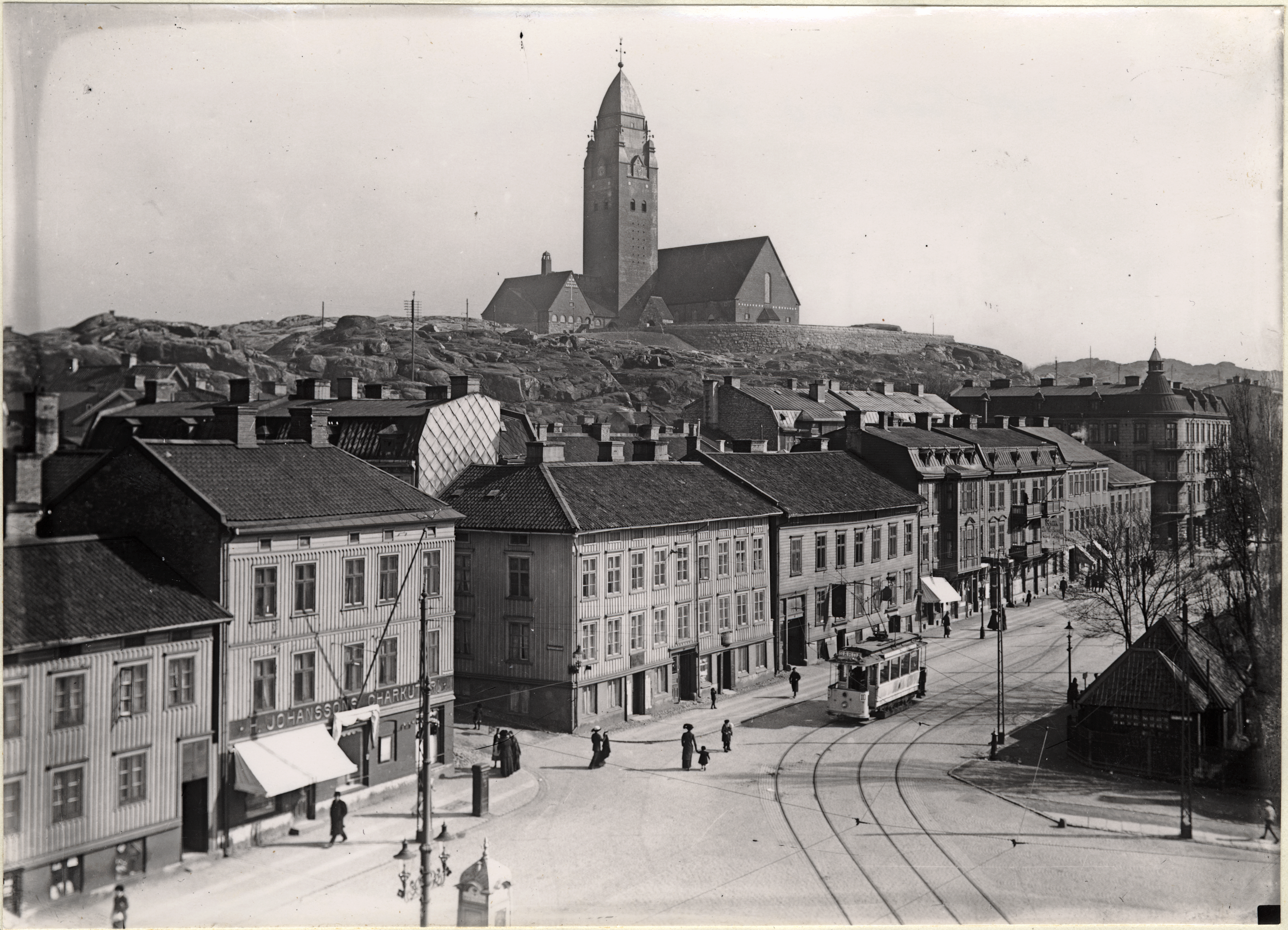
Gothenburg in the 1910s

- 1911 - Landsarkivet i Göteborg (regional archives) opens.
- 1916
  - Göteborg radio begins broadcasting.
  - Gamla Ullevi (1916) (stadium) and Lorensbergsteatern (theatre) open.
- 1917
  - 1917 Gothenburg bread riot.
  - Gothenburg City Theatre established.
- 1919 - Palladium Cinema opens.
- 1920 - Population: 200,577.
- 1922 - Free Port of Gothenburg opens.
- 1923
  - Gothenburg Tercentennial Jubilee Exposition held; Göteborgs Konsthall built.
  - Gothenburg Botanical Garden, Liseberg amusement park, Gothenburg Natural History Museum, and Slottsskogsvallen open.
- 1926 - August: 1926 Women's World Games held.
- 1934 - Gothenburg City Theatre building opens.
- 1936 - Gothenburg city hall building expanded.
- 1939 - Aveny Cinema opens.
- 1940 - Airport built as a military airbase.
- 1948 - Polish Veterans Association established by former Polish prisoners of Nazi German concentration camps.

=== 1950s-1990s ===
- 1952
  - Folkteatern (theatre) opens.
  - Redesign of coat of arms of Gothenburg adopted.
- 1954 - University of Gothenburg established.
- 1958
  - Nya Ullevi (stadium) opens.
  - June: Part of the 1958 FIFA World Cup held in Gothenburg.
- 1960
  - Gothenburg commuter rail begins operating.
  - Population: 443,843.

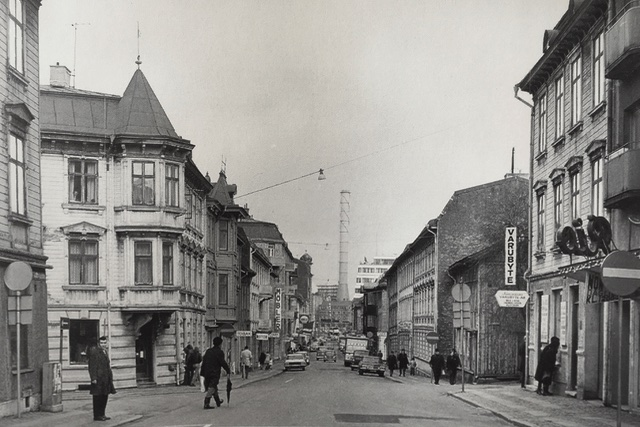
Gothenburg in the 1970s

- 1971
  - Gothenburg District Court established.
  - Scandinavium arena opens.
- 1972 - Göteborg Marathon begins.
- 1977 - Göteborg Horse Show begins.
- 1985 - May: Eurovision Song Contest 1985 held.
- 1990 - Sister city partnership signed between Gothenburg and Kraków, Poland.
- 1993 - Liseberg railway station opens.
- 1995 - BioPalatset cinema in business.
- 1996 - Nils Ericson Terminal for buses opens.
- 1998 - 29 October: Gothenburg discothèque fire.

== 21st century ==
- 2001 - June: EU summit protest.
- 2002 - City co-hosts the 2002 European Men's Handball Championship.
- 2005 - Population: 484,942.
- 2006
  - August: City hosts the 2006 European Athletics Championships.
  - December: City co-hosts the 2006 European Women's Handball Championship.
- 2008 - City hosts the 2008 World Figure Skating Championships.
- 2009
  - Gamla Ullevi (stadium) opens.
  - Gothenburg Roller Derby league formed.
- 2010 - 19 September: Gothenburg 2010 municipal election held.
- 2011
  - Population: 515,129 city; 930,635 metro.
  - City co-hosts the 2011 World Men's Handball Championship.
- 2013
  - 1 January: Gothenburg congestion tax introduced.
  - January–February: City co-hosts the 2013 Bandy World Championship.
  - March: City hosts the 2013 European Athletics Indoor Championships.
  - July: City co-hosts the UEFA Women's Euro 2013.
- 2015
  - 19 March: 2015 Gothenburg pub shooting.
  - 12 June: Car bombing.
- 2016 - City co-hosts the 2016 European Women's Handball Championship.
- 2018 - 13 August: 2018 Sweden vehicle fire attacks
- 2020 - City co-hosts the 2020 European Men's Handball Championship.

== See also ==
- History of Gothenburg
- Timeline of Gothenburg (in Swedish)
- Other names of Gothenburg, e.g. Göteborg, Gotenburg
- Timelines of other municipalities in Sweden: Stockholm, Uppsala

== Bibliography ==
in English

- "Gothenburg" . Encyclopædia Britannica. Vol. 12 (11th ed.). 1911. pp. 271–272.

in Swedish

- "Göteborg", Historiskt-geografiskt och statistiskt lexikon öfver Sverige [Historical-Geographical and Statistical Dictionary of Sweden] (in Swedish), vol. 3, Stockholm: Hammers Förlag, 1859, OCLC 35756300 – via Internet Archive
- Octavia Carlén [in Swedish] (1869). Göteborg: Beskrifning öfver staden och dess närmaste omgifningar [Göteborg: Guidebook] (in Swedish).
- Statistisk årsbok Göteborg [Statistical Yearbook of Gothenburg]. Göteborgs statistik (in Swedish). 1900. 1900-
