= Stockholm during the Swedish Empire =

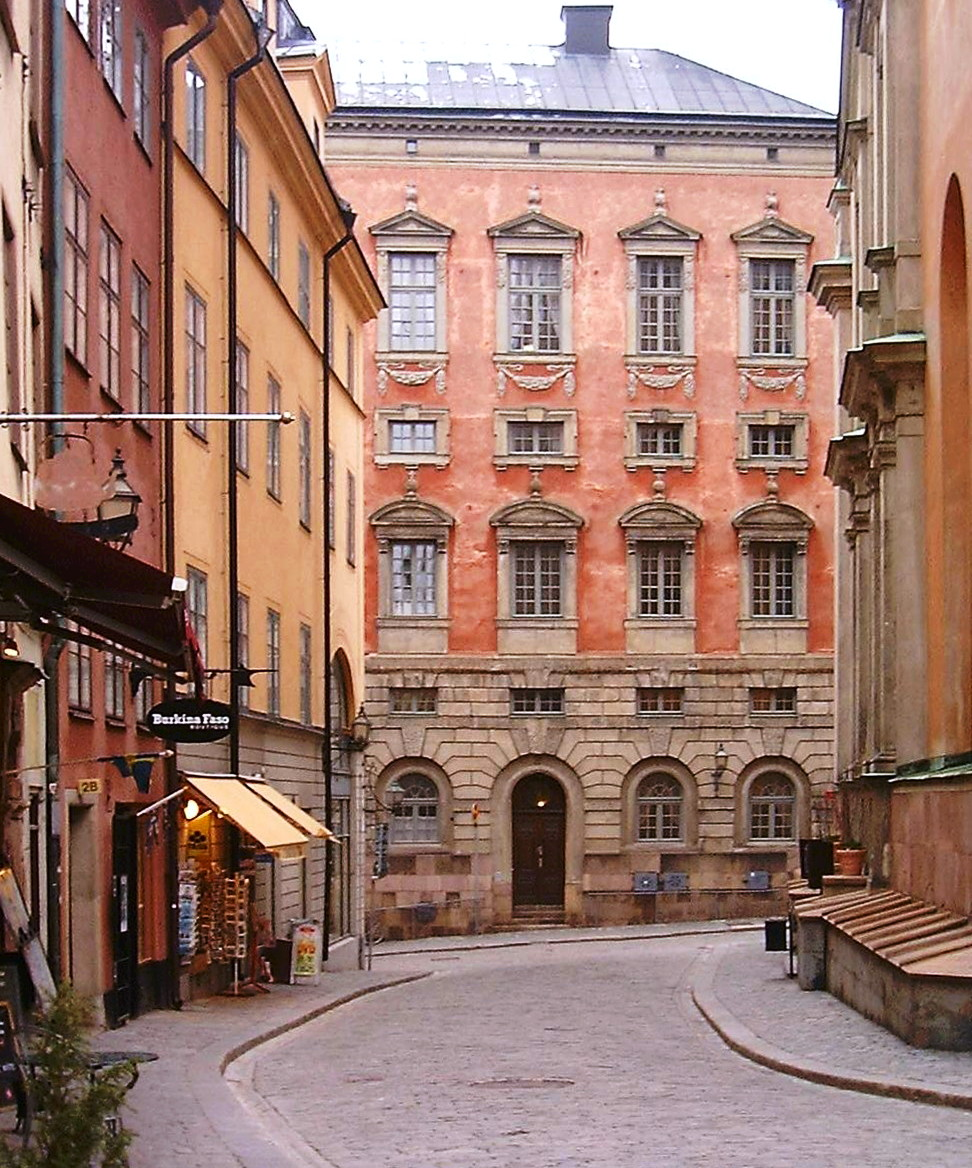
One of the finest surviving examples of the ambitions of the era is undoubtedly Axel Oxenstierna's own palace built from 1653 to the design of Jean de la Vallée (1620–1696).

Stockholm during the Swedish Empire (1611–1718) is the period in the history of Stockholm when the city grew sixfold, many of its present streets were created, and its economy boomed.

== Birth of a capital ==
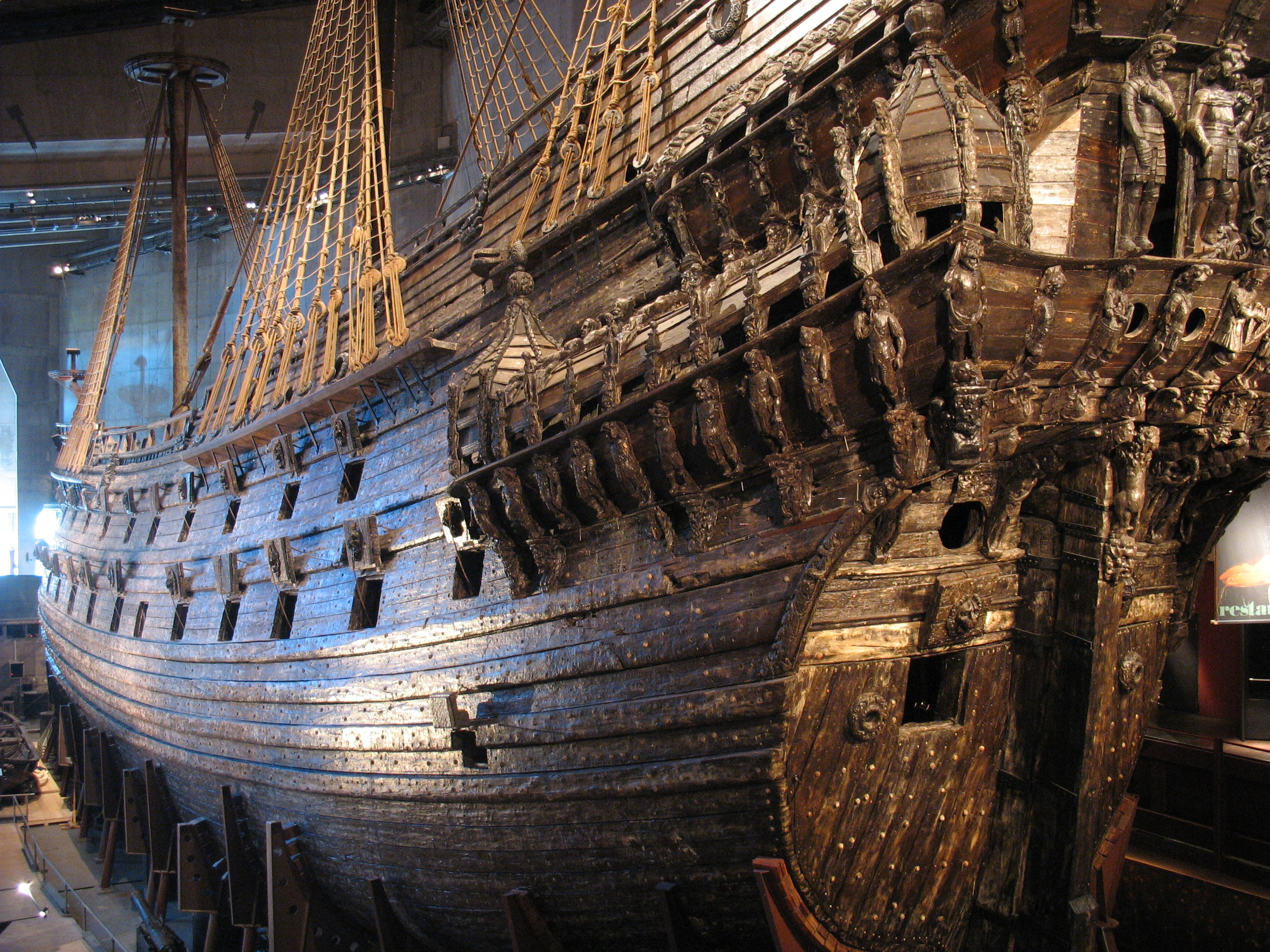
The ship Vasa gives an idea of the era.

In Swedish history, the first half of the 17th century was a period of awakening. As a leading European power, a role which the country was to impose itself following the Thirty Years' War (1618–1648), required the capital to be refurnished with a worthy architectonic rob—the nation was determined never to repeat the embarrassment experienced following the death of Gustavus II Adolphus (1594–1632) when the city, still medieval in character, caused hesitation on whether to invite foreign statesmen for fear the lamentable appearance might undermine the nation's authority.

Therefore, Stockholm saw many ambitious city plans during the era, of which those for the ridges surrounding today's old town still stands. These plans were not only the central pieces in a nationwide process but also formed part of an international trend. In accordance to the mercantilism of the era, opposed to the liberalism still to come, economy was tightly directed top-down. To this goal, cities were crucial as trade and industry was concentrated to cities where it was easier to control—which explains the 17th century enthusiasm for urbanity, not dissimilar to that of the mid 20th century. Additionally, the numerous military conflicts the emerging nation-states involved in, made cities of strategic importance and many new cities were founded throughout Sweden and its newly conquered lands around the Baltic—cities given the strict geometric design of the Baroque era.

In this context, Stockholm was of central importance. In a letter in 1636, Chancellor Axel Oxenstierna (1583–1654), the main architect behind the Swedish central government, wrote that evolving the Swedish capital was a prerequisite for the nation's "power and strength" (rijksens machtt och styrke); that all efforts should be made to ensure "Stockholm arose and that it became populated" (Stockholm kommer opp och den bliffver populerat); and that this would "certainly bring all the other cities on their feet" (Sedan skall väll Stockholm bringa dee andre på behnen). Increased state intervention on city level was not unique to Sweden at this time, but it was probably more prominent in the case of Stockholm than anywhere else in Europe.

Stockholm presented as a capital worthy a powerful nation. Engraving from Eric Dahlberg's Suecia Antiqua et Hodierna around 1690.

The Swedish pretensions and the quick growth at this time can be illustrated by two quotes separated in time by half a century; one from a temporary visitor, and the other from a prominent Swedish propagandist:

...because the buildings all have flattened roofs, covered with birch-bark and verdant turfs in the same manner as the peasant's cottages in Russia. The roofs serve as pasturage, and on some goats are kept grazing, whom occasionally jumps over the street from one building to another and then back again.

Anthonis Goeteeris, Dutch diplomat, 1616–17.

Besides above mentioned monumental buildings, one sees everywhere in Stockholm, here and there handsome and excellent buildings nearly all adorned in carved stone, and the city as well as the suburbs offers all the grander splendour, as do nearly all streets, especially in the suburbs, under Queen Christina regulated into straight lines, which gives the city such an appearance, that the same now begins competing with the most distinguished cities in the world.

Erik Dahlberg, c. 1660–1680.

== Administrative reforms ==
To this end, a reform in 1636 replaced the medieval city council with four committees (kollegier), each having a magistrate (borgmästare) and three aldermen (rådmän), responsible for justice, trade, administration, and construction respectively. This reform was most likely triggered by the establishment of the Office of the Governor of Stockholm (Överståthållarämbetet) in 1634, an office designed to be the government's tool in Stockholm and apparently conceived by Axel Oxenstierna himself. The first Governor to be appointed was Claes Fleming (1592–1644, in office 1634–1644). Because the management of the city had been a spare time occupation beside regular business activities, appointment to the council had previously been based on experience of commerce. The government, wanting to render municipal management more efficient, was instead devoted to promote men with a theoretical education. Two of them were Anders Torstensson, a man who had a profound impact on the development, and Nicodemus Tessin the Elder, the first City Architect. Furthermore, to increase construction quality the qualifications to admission to the mason's guild, members of which were the de facto architects at this time, were straightened up.

== City plans ==
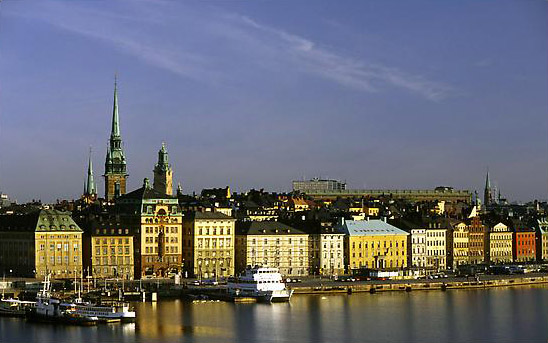
Skeppsbron.

Focusing on the ridges surrounding the city, Stockholm thus saw its first modern city plan, still discernible on modern maps. The then suburban district of Norrmalm, just north of Stadsholmen, had been made a separate city with its own magistrate in 1602. This effectively made implementing any new city plan impossible as the inhabitants there refused to accept to have their homes demolished. This problem was solved in 1635 when Norrmalm was reunified with Stockholm, probably a necessary step for the planned regulations and another indication the entire development was dependent of the government and not the city itself.

The process was initiated by a fire in a brewery on the lower end of Kåkbrinken on September 1, 1625. The wind caught the flames and destroyed most of the buildings on the south-western part of the island—a fatei shared with many prominent buildings throughout Swedish history, in contrast to the unprecedented and enterprising spirit that followed. No surviving documents tells who made what decision, but certain is the government wanted to see a major face lift, and in a letter related to the fire the following year, the king mentions plans ordered by himself (afritningh och scampelun, vi nådigst hafve göra låtidt). Nevertheless, this resulted in the first regulation of Stadsholmen. West of Västerlånggatan two new boulevard-like streets were created—Stora Nygatan and Lilla Nygatan—and along the eastern waterfront the medieval wall was replaced by a row of prestigious palaces—Skeppsbron.

On Malmarna, the surrounding ridges, the first suburb to catch the focus of Oxenstierna was the western part of Norrmalm. A city plan for the district, most likely developed by Anders Torstensson in early 1637, feature several still preserved structures, including Stoore Konnungz gatun ("Large King's Street", today's Drottninggatan) and Mönstre Platz ("??", today's Hötorget). A second devastating fire in 1640 on the eastern part of Norrmalm provided the excuse for a city plan for that district, and at the same time the rural area east of Norrmalm (Ladugårdslandet, today's Östermalm) was donated to the city. Soon Torstensson presented a unified plan for all three northern suburbs, long after his death realized with only minor changes. One of the problems he failed to deal with was the huge ridge Brunkebergsåsen separating the two parts of Norrmalm, and misfits between the non-aligned streets on either side can be seen on modern maps of the city.

The steep northern shore of Södermalm, the island south of the city, presented insurmountable problems. A map from the early 1640s, presenting the ambitious plans for the northern suburbs, still renders a spontaneous conglomeration of meandering streets converging on the southern city gate, but with proposed artery roads dashed. The outline of a main street stretching north to south across the island (corresponding to today's Götgatan) already existed, and is proposed to be straightened out on the map. A completely new proposal was a second artery street, perpendicular to the former and stretching west across the island (today's Hornsgatan). On another map, probably produced a few years later, blocks parallel to these two wide streets are added with spaces left for two churches (Maria Magdalena kyrka and Katarina kyrka) and their graveyards. In 1641, however, the Governor's Office ordered older structures on Södermalm to be demolished, a project started the following year and carried through mostly in accordance to the original plans so thoroughly that virtually no medieval structures are preserved on the island.

Finally, the island Kungsholmen east of present-day St Eriksgatan was also incorporated into the city by a donation in 1644 stipulating that streets and buildings on the island should follow the existent plan for the district. Like on Södermalm, the varied terrain on Kungsholmen made the task of implementing a city plan featuring straight streets impossible, but several of the still existent artery streets date back to this time, including Fleminggatan, Kungsholmsgatan, and Hantverkargatan.

== Population ==
Population grew from less than 10,000 in the early 17th century to more than 50,000 in mid-1670s. The city's income rose from 18,595 daler in 1635–36 to 81,480 daler in 1644. In 1642, approximately 60 per cent of this sum was spent on construction works.

There were about 40 cities in Sweden (including Finland) before the Empire Era, corresponding to approximately 4 per cent of the total population. During the reigns of Eric XIV and John III two thirds of these cities had fewer than 500 citizens, a number slightly increased by the time of Charles IX but still leaving a mere quarter of cities with a population exceeding 1.000 people. Under Oxenstierna, the number of cities doubled to about 85, not including cities incorporated into the Swedish empire through the continuous wars. This was achieved by implementing a hierarchy where a distinction was made between cities with and without a permission to import and export.

== Trade ==
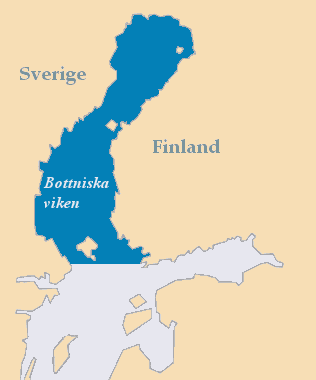
The Gulf of Bothnia was the most important trade area for Stockholm.

While Stockholm was an obvious best choice for the shipping trade on Lake Mälaren and the export of metals from Bergslagen, it was far from the only alternative. Before the death of Charles, Duke of Södermanland (king 1604–11), approximately one fourth of national export passed through Södertälje, but within a few years after Charles' death it was deprived from its export privilege. The second alternative was Gävle, located north of Stockholm much closer to the important mines in Dalarna, through which approximately ten per cent of exported copper and iron passed before Oxenstierna in 1636 prevented foreign ships from sailing north of Stockholm and Åbo, which effectively forced all export to pass through the Swedish capital. This marked the completion of the so-called "Bothnian Trade Coercion" (Bottniska handelstvånget) which forced all trade to pass through Stockholm or, to a lesser extent, Åbo. Most Swedish cities were granted a trade monopoly over a limited area surrounding them, but for Stockholm most of the lands surrounding the Gulf of Bothnia formed part of the city's trade territory. However, the state-granted monopoly was not the only thing that favoured Stockholm at this time. It was one of the best natural harbours of the era and throughout the 17th century countless foreign visitors marvelled at the sight of large ships "with 60 or 70 canons" moored along the eastern quay next to the royal castle.

Stockholm was completely dependent of the transit passing through the city. This dependency incoming fuel and food made it different from other Swedish cities where burghers were not only craftsmen and merchants but also peasants and fishermen which made these cities self-supporting. In contrast, in 1627 Stockholm had 327 horses, 738 cows and 1,383 pigs where, for example, Uppsala with a population about a tenth of Stockholm's, had the same number of horses and cows but more pigs.

=== Consumable goods ===
Of goods brought into Stockholm approximately three-fourths were exported, with the remaining fourth consumed within the city. In 1622 a toll fence forced all consumable items delivered into the city to pass through one of six customs stations. Half of these items, mostly fishery products, were delivered from the Baltic, and corn came from the Lake Mälaren region, occasionally exported out of the city with a peak of 100,000 barrels in 1648. During the later half of the century, the rapidly growing capital could not be supported by the Lake Mälaren region alone and therefore became dependent of corn imported from the Swedish Baltic provinces. For meat, the entire region was dependent of oxen delivered mostly from the western parts of Småland in southern Sweden and in the early 17th century 8–9,000 oxen annually had to take the three weeks walk across the country. In the city minute restrictions detailed how, where, and by who goods could be sold and bought. To what extent authorities actually managed to control the trade remains uncertain. Notwithstanding the detailed regulation, the number of times citizens were reminded of them, gives a hint to what extent they were obeyed.

=== Transit trade ===
Stockholm's share of foreign trade 1590–1685 (%)
Year	Import	Export
1590	64.1	61.3
1615	53.6	80.1
1637–40	67.4	63.5
1661–62	76.2	69.3
1685	77.5	70.6
Iron export (Thousands of skeppund per year)
1560		22
1569		25
1600		29
1640–50		80
1651–60		109
1661–66		142
1677–79		150
1681–85		152
1686–90		165
1691–95		180
1707–10		172
1712–14		162
1716–20		134

What made Stockholm an important trade city on the Baltic Sea, was undoubtedly the transit of goods from Sweden to continental Europe. During the 16th century, Sweden had played a passive rôle in international trade; German merchants and ships managed the export of Swedish primary products such as osmond iron, raw copper, and butter. This export was largely regarded as a means of securing the import of items not available in Sweden, such as salt, wine, and luxury goods demanded by the court.

With the introduction of a mercantile doctrine around 1620 trade became a keystone to governmental income and the Swedish economy subsequently focused on export, not of raw materials but of refined products. Over the entire period (c. 1590–1685), Stockholm's share of national economy remained stable at around two thirds. During the first part of that period, however, annual production was limited to 3–4 thousand tonnes, which, recalculated into bar iron, roughly equivalent to the capacity of a single modern cargo ship. During the first half of the 17th century, exports grew fourfold and imports fivefold.

In the 17th-century, the textile industry was developed with the establishments of the textile manufactures Paulinska manufakturerna (active 1673–1776) and the Barnängens manufaktur (active 1691–1826), which became two of the greatest sources of employments in the Swedish capital during the entire 18th-century.

Among recipients the dominating position of the Hanseatic League was challenged; first by the Netherlands, which received 50 per cent of Swedish export by the mid-17th century, and later by England, which in the 1720s received 60 per cent of export and thus was the most important trade partner for both Stockholm and Sweden. In contrast to the trade of consumable goods, transit trade occurred over greater distances, goods were more expensive, and more middlemen were involved.

Foreign ships landing in Swedish ports, typically Stockholm, were forbidden to continue to another Swedish port and not allowed to stay for more than six weeks. Foreign merchants, however, knew how to use Swedish dummies to avoid these restrictions and when the number of Swedish merchants increased in the early 17th century, it probably reflects how traders adopted to the double customs imposed on foreigners.

== See also ==
- History of Stockholm
- Timeline of Stockholm history
- History of Sweden
- Bollhuset
