= Jonslund =

- Location within Västra Götaland Location within Sweden
- Coordinates: 58°10′N 12°50′E
- Country: Sweden
- Province: Västergötland
- County: Västra Götaland County
- Municipality: Essunga Municipality

Area
  - Total: 0.57 km^{2} (0.22 sq mi)

Population (31 December 2010)
  - Total: 293
  - Density: 512/km^{2} (1,330/sq mi)
- Time zone: UTC+1 (CET)
  - Summer (DST): UTC+2 (CEST)

Jonslund is a locality situated in Essunga Municipality, Västra Götaland County, Sweden. It had 293 inhabitants in 2010. The area has a school, kindergarten and public bathing quarters. As the community grew, Jonslunds school was built in 1965.
