= Stockholm during the early Vasa era =

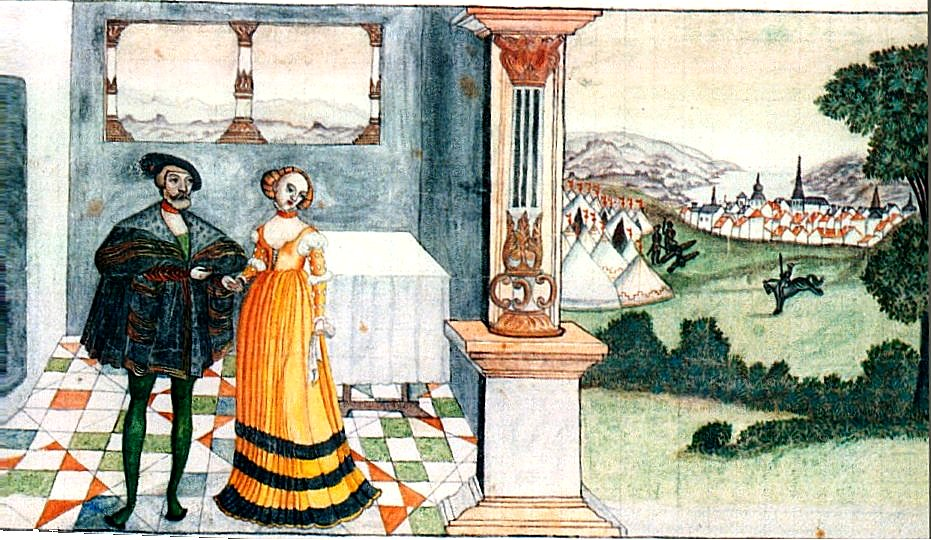
Image from Triumph of Vasa, showing Gustav Vasa besieging Stockholm. in 1521.

Stockholm during the early Vasa era (1523–1611) is a period in the history of Stockholm when Gustav Vasa and his sons, Eric, John, John's son Sigismund, and finally Gustav's youngest son Charles, ruled Sweden from the Stockholm Palace.

== City of the state ==
On the day he entered Stockholm, Gustav Vasa guaranteed citizens who wished to stay in the city protection of their lives and property, and, for those who preferred to leave, the right to bring personal property with them if real property was turned over to the king. The king finally restored the privileges of the city in 1529. They were mostly identical to the privileges the city had in 1436 and proved beneficiary to the burghers of the city, giving them a monopoly on several important trades. To maintain his control over the city, the king, just like King Christian before him, acted by means of directly controlling the elections of aldermen and magistrates. Initially, Vasa's influence over these appointments seem to have been somewhat balanced by the laws of the rural districts (concerning the appointment of the judges in the hundreds, häradshövdingar) which stipulated the king should choose the most suitable leader among three proposed candidates. During most of his rule, however, his strong position made any such limitations in his influence unlikely, and the delimitation between the jurisdiction of the state and that of the city in which it resided, must have been vague. By the mid-century, the number of city officials increased from 12 and up to 19, not only in order to make management more professional, but also because the state wanted more control over trade, demands that burdened the still volunteered members of the city council, most of whom were merchants (only three prominent craftsmen are mentioned 1545–1559). The city thus lost much of the independence it had during the Middle Ages and became politically and financially bound to the state.

The death of Gustav Vasa hardly caused any changes in local government. During the reign of his sons (1561–1611) the city council remained escorted by a royal representative and both magistrates and aldermen were appointed by the king.

== Reformation ==
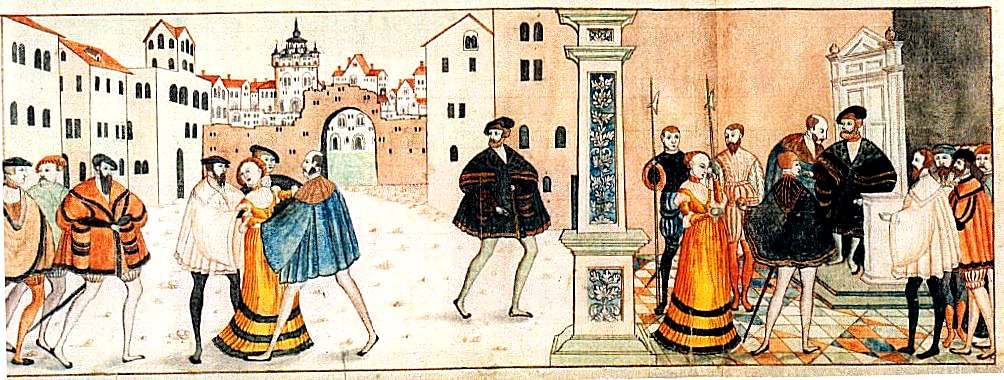
Image from Triumph of Vasa, showing the king abandoning the Catholic Church.

The city Vasa took charge over had changed dramatically: As the Bloodbath had killed many of the city's prominent citizens, the king, who had no wish to return to the old order, could appoint city magistrates as he wished and thus controlled the city. He could use the Storkyrkan church as a bastion and force churches and other religious institutions to hand over countless gold and silver objects, an income used to pay his war debt to Lübeck. Additionally, he invited the clergyman Olaus Petri (1493–1552) to become the city secretary of Stockholm. With the two side by side, the new ideas of the Protestant Reformation could be quickly implemented, and sermons in the church were held in Swedish starting in 1525 and Latin abolished in 1530. A consequence of this development was a need for separate churches for the numerous German and Finnish-speaking citizens and during the 1530s the still existent German and Finnish parishes were created. The king was, however, not favourably disposed to older chapels and churches in the city, and not only did he order churches and monasteries on the ridges surrounding the city to be demolished—according to himself because the citizens feared they would impair the defence of the city—but he also wanted to see the city church destroyed because of its location near the royal castle—plans however never carried through. The many charitable institutions run by these religious institutions were converged into a single one, Danviken Hospital, which most likely couldn't offer the social services of its predecessors. A disaster for the many disabled in the city, further deepened twenty-five years later when the hospital was relocated out of sight from the city.

== Fortifications ==
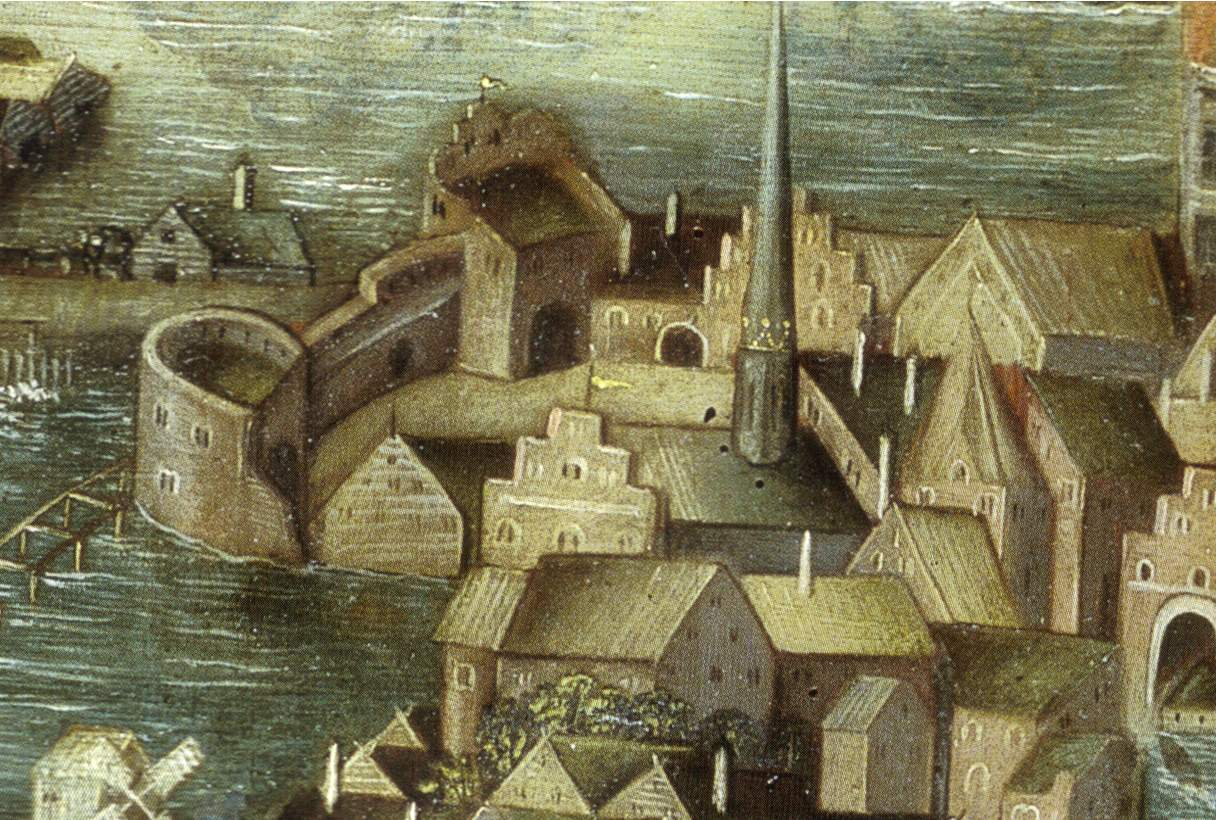
Northern city gate in 1535 as depicted in the Vädersolstavlan painting.

In medieval times, the city walls were the responsibility of the city council, which used one-half to two-thirds of the tax collected for the construction and maintenance of the defensive structures. The city was, together with Kalmar which also had a city wall, in reward exempt from the tax paid by other Swedish cities. Gustav Vasa installing himself on the throne did not affect these responsibilities, but decisions on what structures to build where did. The extent to which the king controlled the city became apparent in the mid-1530s when he heavy-handedly stroke down on a German conspiracy and had all small arms in the city transferred from the town hall to the royal palace. He thus had the southern city gate, still damaged since Christian II's siege in 1520, rebuilt during the 1520s, and then had towers with flanking walls constructed along the western shore of Riddarholmen and by the northern gate, fortifications further reinforced during the following two decades. Due to land elevation the number of navigable approaches to the city through the Stockholm Archipelago had been reduced to one, and the defence of the eastern shore could therefore be relocated out of town to Vaxholm.

== Trade ==
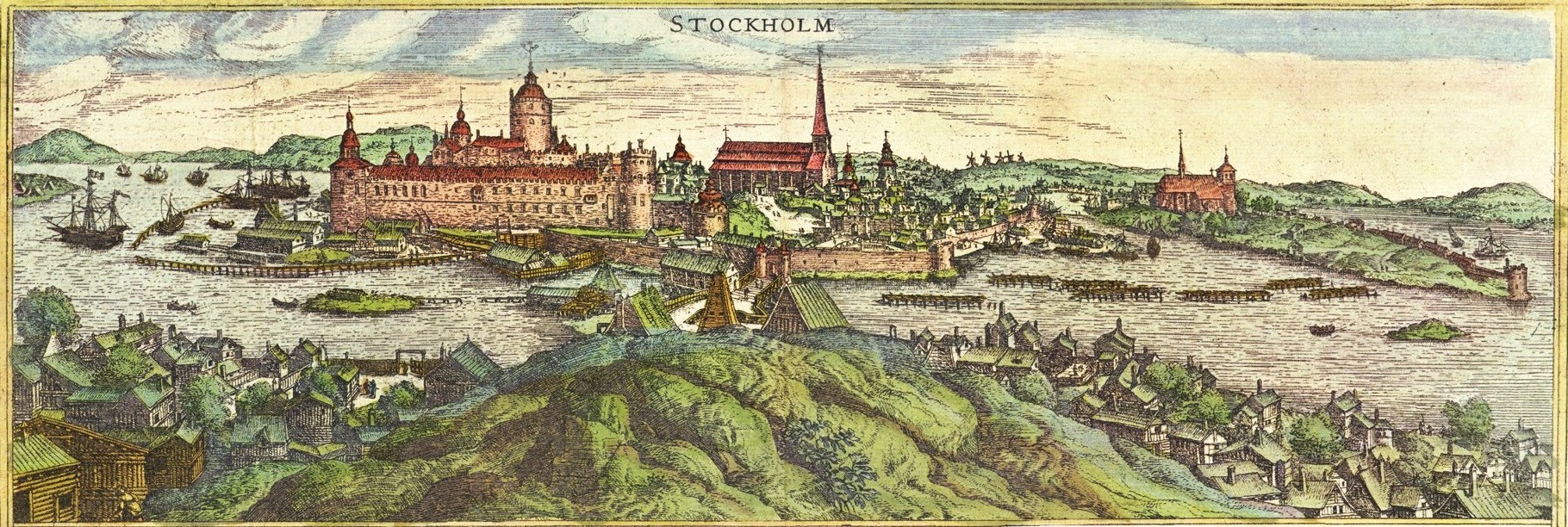
Panoramic view showing the northern city gate with fortifications. Copperplate by Frantz Hogenberg around 1570-80

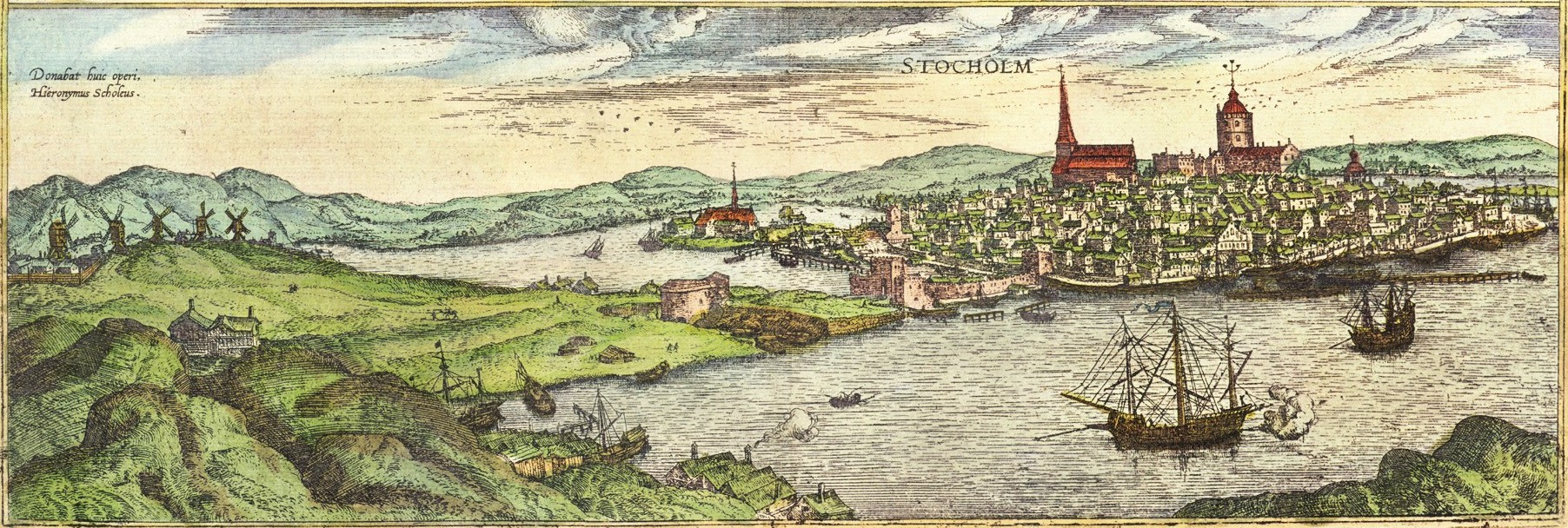
The southern city gate with parts of the eastern harbour called Koggabron ("Cog Harbour") Copperplate by Frantz Hogenberg

While the medieval structure of Stockholm remained mostly unaltered during the 16th century, the city's social and economic importance grew to the extent that no king could permit the city to determine its own faith. Export from the city by the end of the 1550s has been estimated to 600.000 marks, four to five times the export from any other Swedish city (such as Nya Lödöse and Söderköping). So, by controlling trade to and from Stockholm, the king effectively controlled national trade. The most important export items at this time was iron (56%), butter (11%), train oil (10%), and salmon (6%) (export of copper was prohibited during the later reign of Vasa). The most important destinations for these goods were Lübeck (60%) and Danzig (30%), with the remaining 10% shipped to Baltic cities, Stralsund and Rostock, Denmark, the Netherlands and France. While Lübeck apparently was an important trade partner, confrontations between the king and the German city caused export to be diverted to other destinations over periods, and in 1549–55 export to Lübeck was prohibited for Swedish citizens. Import of salt was important. Preserved records from the era fail to detail the amount of other goods delivered to the city from the rural areas surrounding it, including agricultural products produced in the Lake Mälaren region such as butter and fur.

During the reign of Vasa's sons Stockholm was dominating every aspect of the country. While the city hardly produced anything exportable by itself, approximately two-thirds of national export was channelled through the city; an export dominated by iron and copper from Bergslagen but which also included agricultural items, such as butter and occasionally corn, and forestry products, such as pitch and tar. While this trade caused many Swedes to settle in the city, the trade and the capital needed to control it was largely in the hands of the king and German merchants from Lübeck and Danzig.

== Hereditary bastion ==
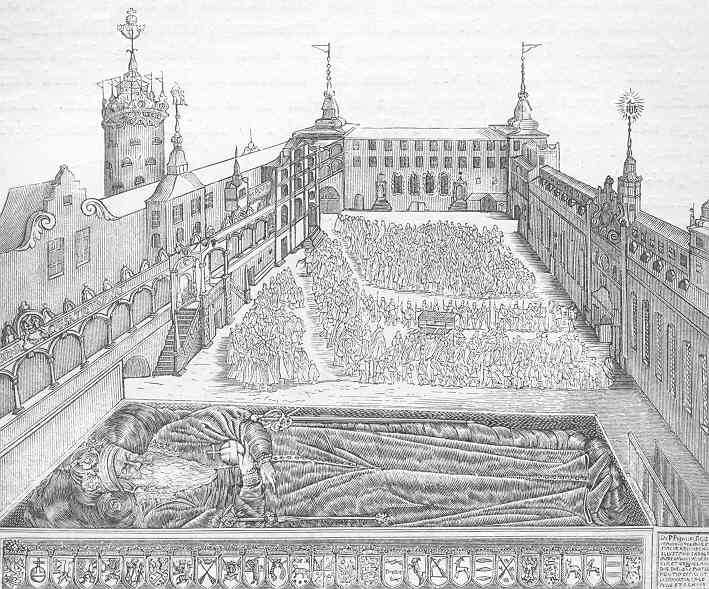
Funeral of John III. Image from the 19th century showing the courtyard of the Stockholm Castle.

When Eric XIV, the son of Gustav Vasa, was crowned king in 1561, the title had been made hereditary and the kingdom was now financed not by income from royal properties and privileges, but by taxes. Furthermore, at this time the extent of the kingdom, because of the guarded foreign politics of Gustav Vasa largely unchanged during his rule, started to grow as the disintegrating Teutonic Order left the Baltic exposed to new ambitious powers, and Reval, as a consequence, asked for Swedish protection against Russia and Poland and became a Swedish dominion. Though Sweden could hardly present the level of government and bureaucracy prerequisite to have a capital in the modern sense, Stockholm was the kingdom's strongest bastion and the king's main residence. As Eric XIV's pretensions were in pair with those of Renaissance princes on the continent, he afforded himself a court the size his finance could possibly support, and the royal castle was thus the biggest employer in the city, more so when the king was present in person. In connection to his crowning in 1561, his taste for luxury caused the Crown to consume between two-thirds and three-quarters of the city's import.

== Population ==
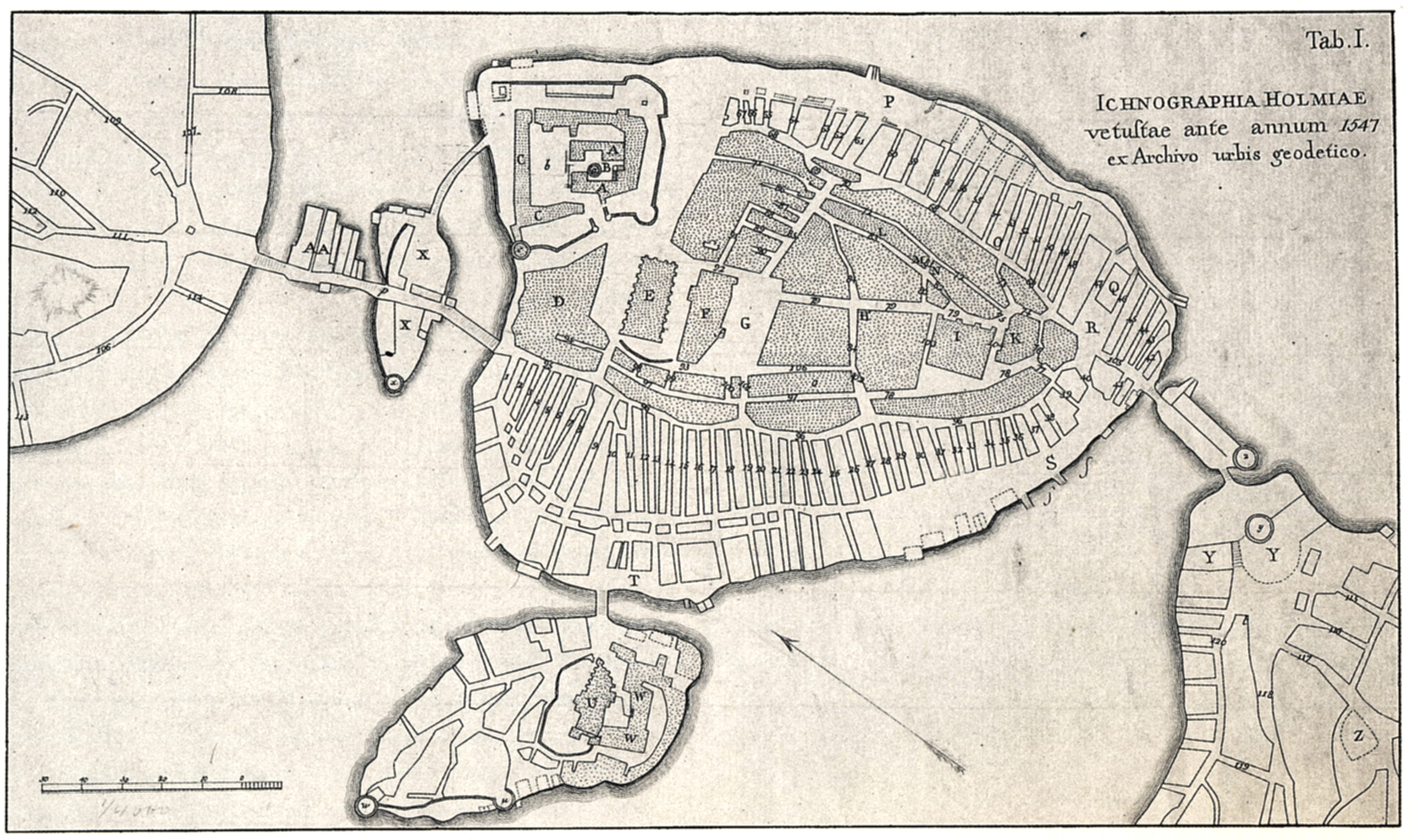
Map of Stockholm in 1547

Around 1560–80, most of the citizens, some 8.000 people, still lived on Stadsholmen. This central island was at this time densely settled and the city was now expanding on the surrounding ridges. Wooden buildings were prohibited on the island, but as this regulation was announced at countless occasions it was apparently often ignored. By the early 1580s two-thirds of the 731 residential buildings on the island were built in stone, and of these about four-fifths were small one-family residences − narrow buildings two or three stories tall. There were no private palaces at this time and the only larger buildings were the castle, the church, and the former Greyfriars monastery on Riddarholmen. This urbanity could hardly have made a lasting impression on any visitor, but the structures on the surrounding ridges failed to meet even these standards as Gustav Vasa, who, for defensive purposes, required any structures outside the city to be easily burnt down, had made sure the ridges couldn't even present a single timber framed building. So instead, the ridges were primarily used for activities that either required a lot of space, produced odours, or could cause fire. Even though some burgher had secondary residences outside the city, the population living on the ridges, perhaps a quarter of the city's population, were mostly poor, including the royal personnel occupying the northern ridges.

== See also ==
- Timeline of Stockholm history
- History of Sweden
- History of Sweden (1523–1611)
