= Timeline of Uppsala =

The following is a timeline of the History of Uppsala.

== Pre-christian Uppsala ( -1087) ==
- ca 1000 BC – Håga mound.
- ca 800 BC – Granhammarsmannen.
- ca 0 – Yngvi found the city of Gamla Uppsala according to Heimskringla.
- 98 – Oldest known reference to the Svear is made by Tacitus.
- 550–625 – Gamla Uppsala archaeological area.
- 984 – Battle of Fýrisvellir.
- 1087 – Temple at Uppsala is burned.

== Medieval Uppsala (1087–1521) ==
- 1160 – Erik den helige is murdered in Uppsala.
- 1164 – Gamla Uppsala becomes Sweden's archdiocese.
- 1246 – Katedralskolan is founded.
- 1247 – A franciscan convent is erected in Uppsala.
- 1268 – Uppsala burns for the fourth time.
- 1273 – The Archdiocese of Uppsala is moved from Gamla Uppsala to Uppsala.
- 1296 – Birger Magnusson vindicates Upplandslagen.
- 14th century – Ärkebiskopsborgen, the castle of the Archbishop of Uppsala, is constructed at the site of the current University Hall.
- 1435 – The construction of Uppsala cathedral is completed..
- 1437 – Several buildings are damaged in a city fire.
- 1473 – Uppsala is almost devastated by a city fire.
- 1477 – Uppsala university opens.
- 1497 – Uppsala receives town privileges.
- 1520 – Good Friday battle of Uppsala is fought.
- 1521 – Conquest of Uppsala occurs.

== Vasa era (1520–1718) ==
- 1543 – In a widespread city fire most of the eastern city is destroyed.
- 1549 – Construction of Uppsala Castle begins.
- 1567 – Oldest parts of Uppsala Castle are completed.
- 1567 – Sture Murders are committed at Uppsala Castle.
- 1572 – Swedish Church Ordinance 1571 is adopted in Uppsala.
- 1572 – Uppsala castle is partly destroyed due to a suspected arson.
- 1593 – Uppsala Synod.
- 1622 – Construction of Gustavianum begins.
- 1643 – The first city plan is adopted.
- 1654 – Queen Christina of Sweden announces her abdication in Uppsala.
- 1663 – The student nations of Uppsala are legalized by the Konsistorium of the university.
- 1669 – The Codex Argentus is donated to Uppsala university.
- 1675 – The parliament of 1675 is held in Uppsala.
- 1702 – Most of Uppsala is destroyed in a comprehensive city fire.
- 1708 – Akademiska sjukhuset is founded.

== Age of Liberty and the Gustavian era (1718–1809) ==
- 1741 – Carl von Linné becomes a professor at Uppsala university.
- 1741 – Anders Celsius inaugurates Sweden's first observatory, located in Celsiushuset, Uppsala.
- 1766 – A city fire ruins parts of eastern Uppsala.
- 1791–1794 – Vitterhetssamfundet in Uppsala.

== Union era (1809–1905) ==
- 1809 – A city fire rages in Uppsala.
- 1841 – Carolina Rediviva is inaugurated.
- 1843 – Uppsala host the first nordic student meeting.
- 1855 – Foundation the female seminary Klosterskolan.
- 1856 – Uppsala host a second nordic student meeting.
- 1858 – A new city plan is adopted. Uppsala expands beyond the urban square of 1643.
- 1865 – Foundation of the secondary school Uppsala högre elementarläroverk för flickor for girls.
- 1866 – Uppsala Central Station is inaugurated.
- 1867 – The first parts Akademiska sjukhusets current locals are inaugurated.
- 1872 – Betty Pettersson becomes Uppsala university's, and Sweden's, first female student.
- 1875 – Uppsala hosts the final nordic student meeting.
- 1887 – University Hall is inaugurated by Oscar II of Sweden.
- 1890 – Upsala Nya Tidning is founded.

== War era (1905–1945) ==
- 1907 – IK Sirius is founded.
- 1909 – Studenternas IP is inaugurated.
- 1922 – Statens institut för rasbiologi is founded as the first official state institute for eugenics.
- 1932 – Fredrik von Sydow kills himself and his wife Ingun during an attempt to arrest the couple for the Von Sydow murders.
- 1939 – Bollhusmötet is held in Uppsala.
- 1943 – The Easter riots takes place in Gamla Uppsala.

== Modern Uppsala (1945–) ==
- 1958–1978 – Most of the city core experience a comprehensive urban renewal.
- 1983 – Livets Ord is founded in Uppsala.
- 1995 – Uppsala Mosque is inaugurated.
- 2007 – Uppsala Konsert & Kongress is inaugurated.
- 2011 – The population of Uppsala Municipality surpasses 200 000 persons.

== See also ==
- Timelines of other municipalities in Sweden: Gothenburg, Stockholm
