= Timeline of Stockholm =

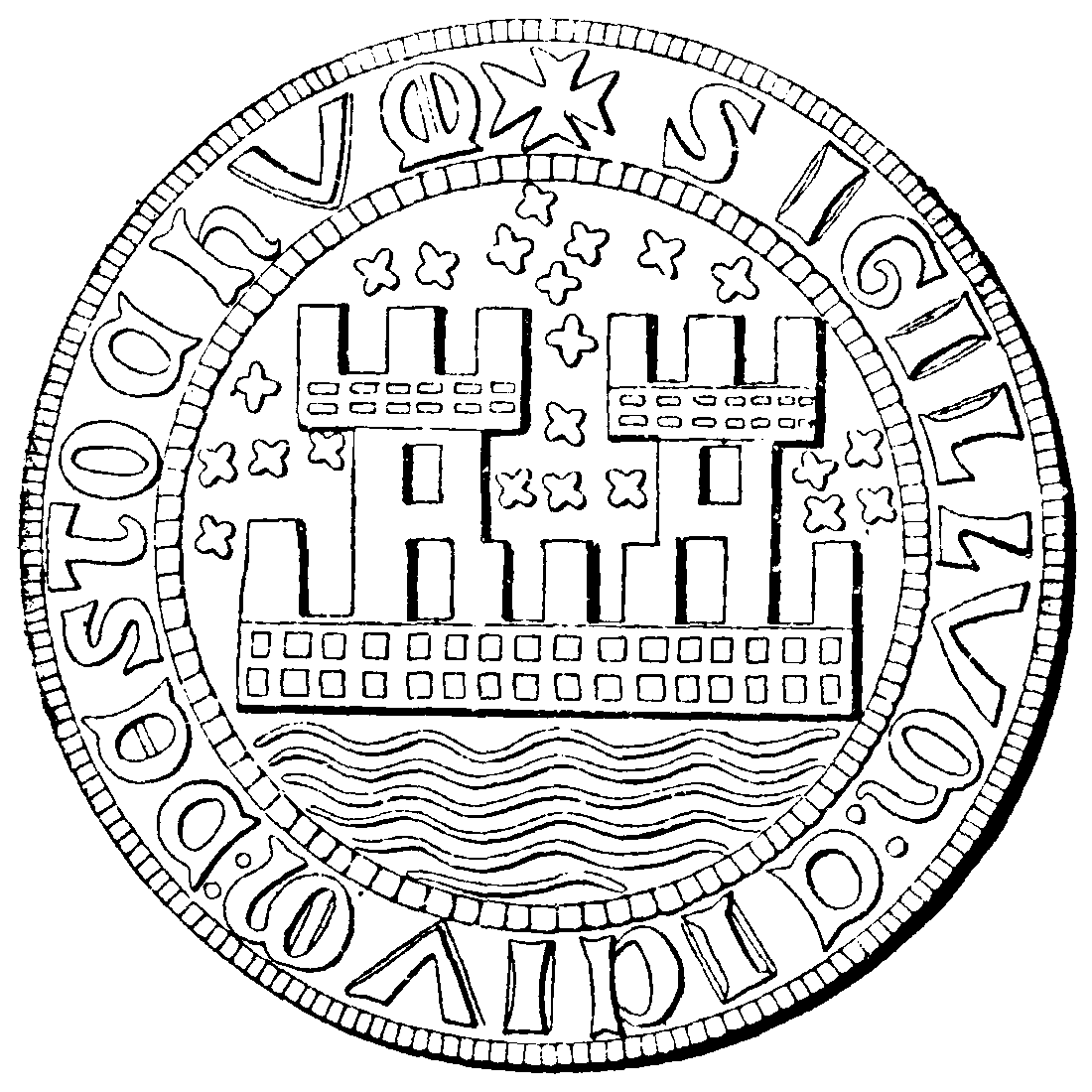
Seal of Stockholm known from an imprint from 1296; most likely the city's first seal mentioned in a letter from 1281.

The following is a timeline of the history of the city of Stockholm, Sweden.

== Pre-history ==
- 750–790: The trade centre Birka is established on Lake Mälaren (then part of the Baltic Sea) not far from Stockholm.
- c. 975: Birka is abandoned.
- c. 1000: Sigtuna emerges as the city dominating the Lake Mälaren region.
- 1247: Battle of Sparrsätra Birger Magnusson defeats the "true Folkungs".
- 1248: Birger becomes jarl.
- 1250: Birger initiates a "crusade" against the "tavasts".
- 1251: Battle of Herrevadsbro where Birger eliminates the "true Folkungs".

== Middle Ages ==
- 1252: First historical mentioning of Stockholm.
- 1266: Birger dies and is buried at Varnhem's church.
- 1269: First known political confrontation in Stockholm.
- 1270: Greyfriars, Stockholm, is founded.
- 1275: Magnus Ladulås becomes king.
- 1279: Storkyrkan is first mentioned.
- 1280: A political meeting at Adelsö results in the establishment of Swedish nobility.
- 1281: The seal of Stockholm is first mentioned.
- 1285: Magnus decrees he wishes to be buried in Stockholm.
- 1289: In a decree, Magnus grants citizens settling near St. Clare's Priory, Stockholm on Norrmalm the same rights as citizens within the city walls (which also gets mentioned for the first time), resulting in the first expansion beyond the central island Stadsholmen.
- 1289: In a letter to the Pope, Stockholm is described as having become "more populous than any other city in our country in a few years".
- 1290: Magnus dies, his son Birger becomes king.
- 1292: Magnus is buried in the Greyfriars church.
- 1293: Under Torkel Knutsson, a crusade is launched aiming at the Vyborg Bay.
- 1336: Foundation of the Black Friars' Monastery of Stockholm
- 1350: The Black Death enters the city
- 1388: The city is given full city rights, as ratified by king Albert of Mecklenburg
- 1389: The rivalry between the Swedish and German population leads to a massacre on the Swedes, the Käpplinge murders, by the German Hättebröder.
- 1392: Forces of the Danish Queen Margaret besieged the city
- 1392: Privateers named Victual Brothers supplied the besieged city with food
- 1419: Stockholm becomes the capital of Sweden
- 1471: The Battle of Brunkeberg is won by Sten Sture the elder, and the Danish are ousted.
- 1483: Printer Johann Snell active.

== 16th century ==
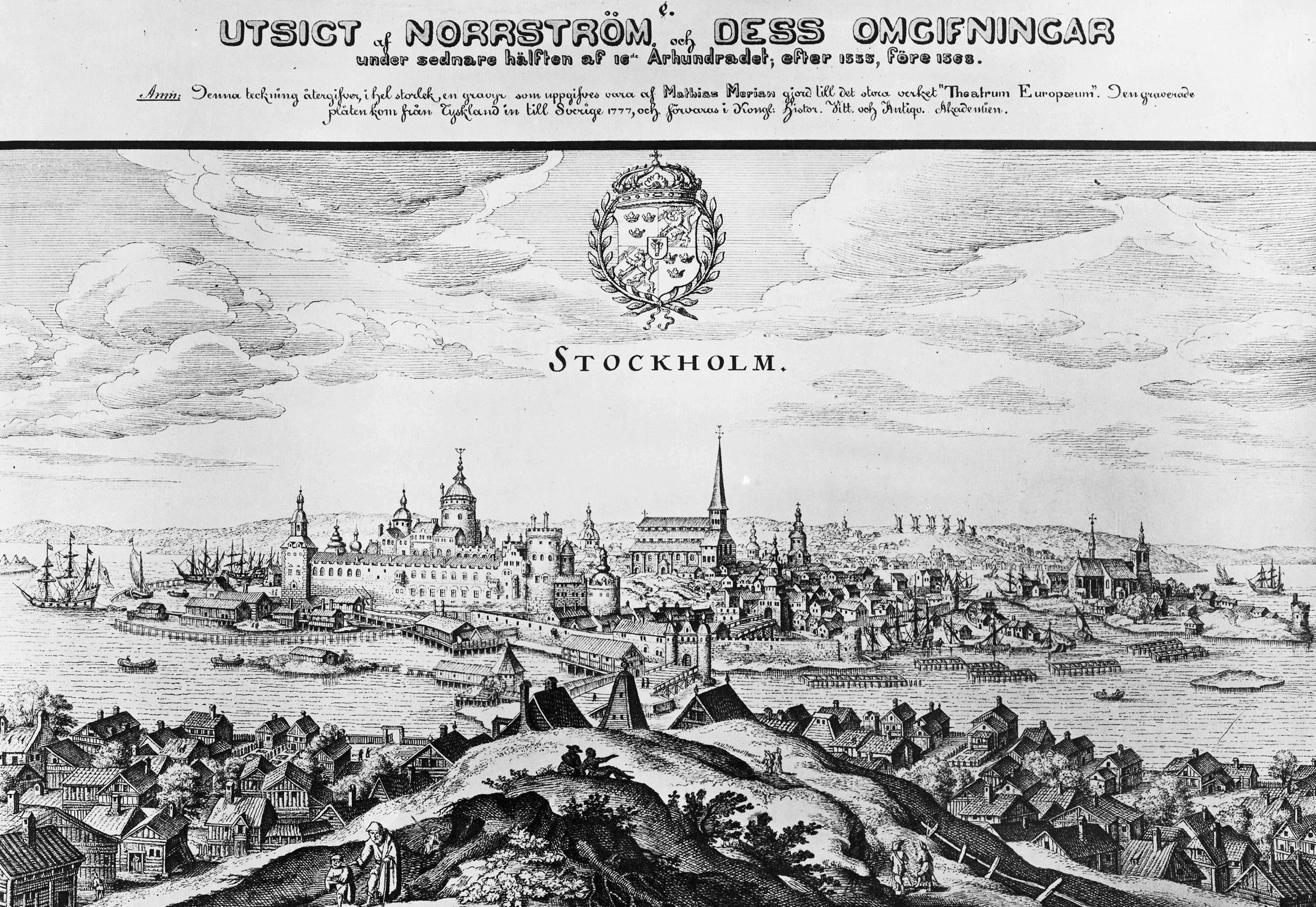
Stockholm in the mid-16th century

- 1520: The Stockholm bloodbath is perpetrated by Christian II of Denmark
- 1521: Gustav Vasa marches into Stockholm.
- 1527-28: The Swedish Reformation close down all convents operating in Stockholm.
- 1558: Danviken Hospital is inaugurated to replace the social care previously managed by the convents.
- 1576: Foundation of the Catholic Collegium Regium Stockholmense attracts controversy.
- 1593: The Collegium regium Stockholmense is closed after a riot.

== 17th century ==
- 1602: Norrmalm is made an autonomous city.
- 1611: Gustavus II Adolphus becomes king.
- 1618: The scandal around the infamous brothel of Sara Simonsdotter is exposed.
- 1622: First preserved map of Stockholm dates from this year
- 1625: A devastating fire destroys the south-western part of Stadsholmen. A city plan for the area is produced the following year.
- 1630: Gustavus enters the Thirty Years' War.
- 1632: Gustavus dies at the Battle of Lützen.
- 1633: The orphanage Stora Barnhuset is founded.
- 1632–1644: Regency of Queen Christina led by Axel Oxenstierna.
- 1634: An Instrument of Government establishes the first Office of the Governor of Stockholm (Överståthållarämbetet).
- 1635: Norrmalm is unified with Stockholm.
- 1636: An important reform renders the management of the city more efficient. Anders Torstensson begins working in Stockholm. The prison Nya Smedjegården is founded.
- 1637: Regulation of Norrmalm begins.
- 1639–40: Parts of Ladugårdslandet is donated to the city.
- 1640: Eastern part of Norrmalm is destroyed by fire. A city plan is quickly set up for the district. The first public theatre, Björngårdsteatern, opens.
- 1642: Regulation begins on Södermalm. A decision is taken to transfer Munklägret to the city.
- 1644: Eastern half of Kungsholmen is donated to the city.
- 1648: Peace of Westphalia grants Sweden considerable territories in the southern Baltic region.
- 1649: Inauguration of the women's work house prison Långholmens spinnhus.
- 1654: Queen Christina abdicates. Charles X of Sweden becomes king.
- 1665: Jean de la Vallée produces a plan for a street stretching from Gustav Adolfs Torg to Hagaparken (Sveavägen).
- 1661: Nicodemus Tessin the Elder becomes City Architect.
- 1667: The theaters of Lejonkulan and Bollhuset is inaugurated, initially as court theaters, but soon also open to the public.
- 1682: The theatre Dän Swänska Theatren is founded.

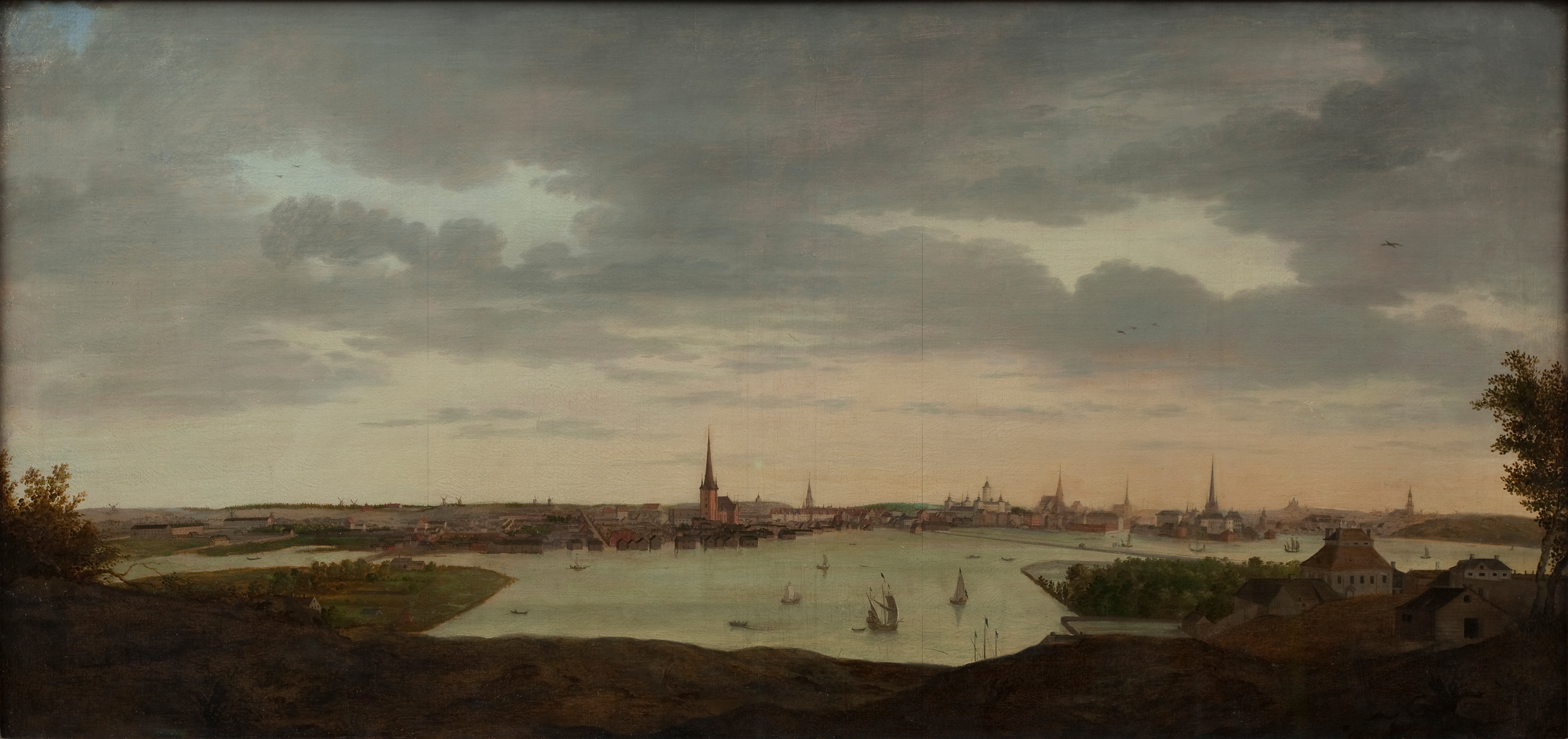
Stockholm in the late 17th century

- 1691: The textile factory Barnängens manufaktur, one of the two biggest in the capitol during the following century, is founded.
- 1695: The tapestry manufacture Tapetskolan vid Karlberg is closed.
- 1697: The Royal Castle is destroyed in a fire.
- 1699: The French court theatre La troupe du Roi de Suede is inaugurated.

== 18th century ==
- 1710: The Great Northern War plague outbreak reach the city.
- 1719: The city narrowly escapes Russian invasion during the Russian Pillage of 1719–21.
- 1731: The religious dissident group Gråkoltarna is imprisoned.
  - The popular inn Clas på Hörnet is founded.
- 1737: The first national stage, Kungliga svenska skådeplatsen, is founded in the theatre of Bollhuset.
- 1752: The first modern hospital, Serafimerlasarettet, is founded.
- 1753: The Du Londel Troupe inaugurate the French theater at Bollhuset.
- 1754: Stockholm Palace is completed enough to house the royal court.
  - The case celebre of Risbadstugan.
- 1756: The queen's failed Coup of 1756 is suppressed in the streets of the capital.
- 1759: Great Stockholm Fire 1759.
- 1768: December Crisis (1768).
- 1772: Absolute monarchy is reintroduced through the Revolution of 1772.
- 1772: Torture is abolished, and the torture chambers Tjuvakällaren and Rosenkammaren is closed.
  - The Vauxhall pleasure gardens is opened.
- 1773: Foundation of the Royal Swedish Opera and the Royal Swedish Ballet in Bollhuset.
- 1775: Foundation of the first maternity hospital, Allmänna BB.
- 1781: The French Theater of Gustav III is inaugurated.
- 1784: The Stenborg Company inaugurate a permanent theatre, the Stenborg Theatre.
- 1788: Foundation of the Royal Dramatic Theatre.
- 1792: King Gustav III of Sweden is murdered on a masquerade at the Opera.
- 1793: Ebel riot.
- 1798-99: A theater monopoly is introduced which reserve all theater performances within the city walls of Stockholm to the two royal theaters: Royal Swedish Opera and the Royal Dramatic Theatre. This monopoly is in place until 1842.

== 19th century ==
- 1801: Foundation of the Djurgårdsteatern.
- 1806: The steam engine is introduced in Stockholm at the Eldkvarn gristmill.
- 1809: The Coup of 1809 is staged in the streets of the capital, deposing the monarch.
- 1810: The Fersen murder riot.

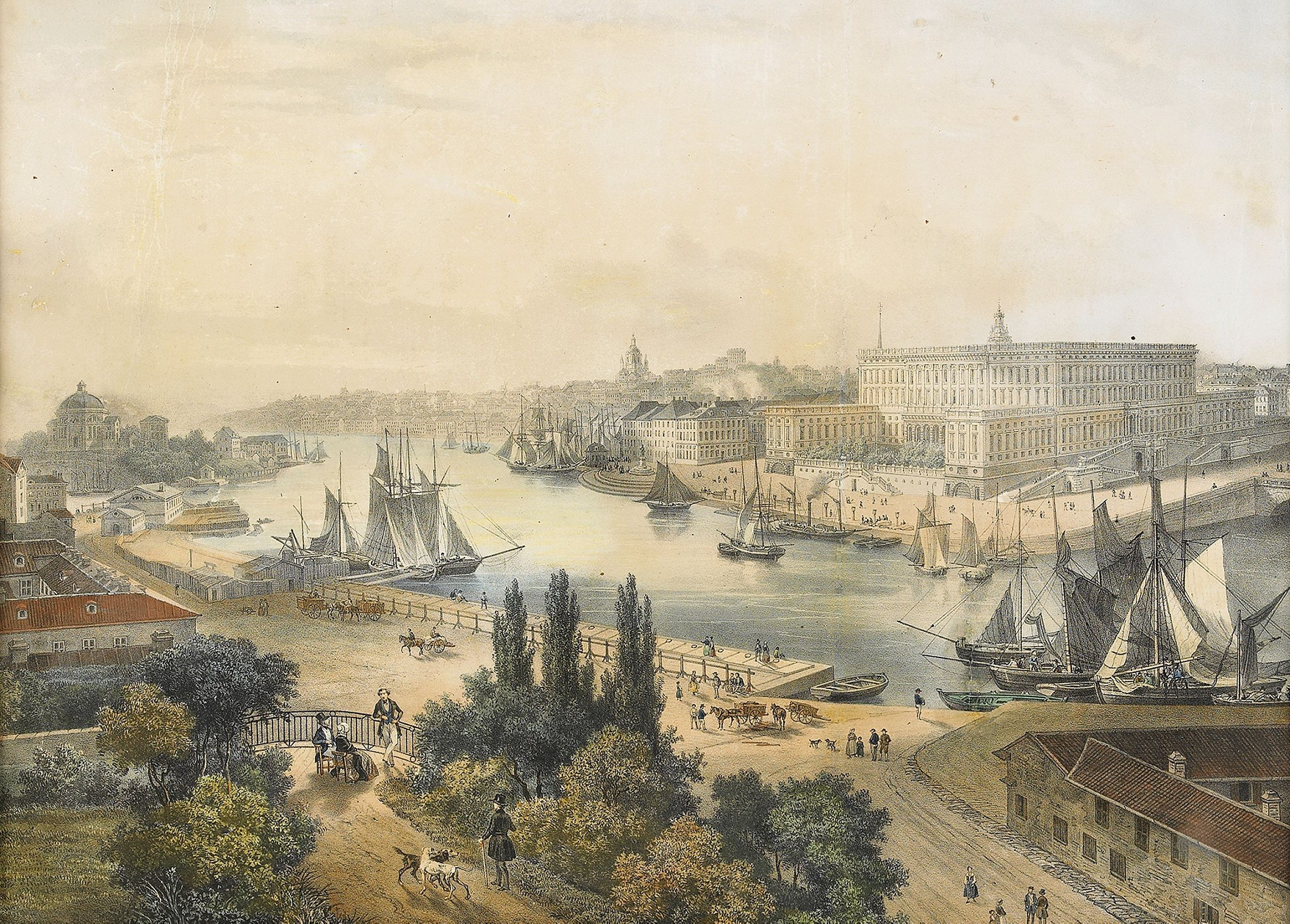
Stockholm in the 1830s

- 1831: Foundation of Wallinska skolan, the first school offering serious education to female pupils.
- 1838: The local city authorities makes an attempt to control prostitution through the sponsorship of two approved brothels, London and Stadt Hamburg: the experiment is however discontinued in 1841.
  - The Rabulist riots.
- 1839: Foundation of Stockholms Lyceum.
- 1842: The theater monopoly is abolished and Mindre teatern is founded.
- 1846: Adolf Eugene von Rosen and Georg Theodor Policron von Chiewitz proposes a regulation of Gamla stan.
- 1847: Åhlinska skolan is founded.
- 1848: The riots March Unrest occur inspired by the Revolutions of 1848.
- 1851: The first Deaconess institution in Sweden, Ersta diakoni, is founded headed by Maria Cederschiöld (deaconess).
- 1852: Sofia Posse takes over the prestigious finishing school Hammarstedtska skolan.
- 1853: 1853 Stockholm cholera outbreak.
- 1854: The women's charity foundation Fruntimmersällskapet för fångars förbättring is founded.
- 1857: A regulation of Gamla stan is proposed by A. E. Schuldheis and discussed in the parliament. Gets rejected two years later.
- 1859: Södra Teatern is established.
- 1860: A.E. Schwabitz and A.E. Rudberg produces a proposal for the regulation of Gamla stan.
- 1861: Högre lärarinneseminariet, the first academic institution open to women, is founded. A decision is taken to construct Strandvägen.
- 1862: Rudberg publishes a minor revision of his proposal. A new administrative reform comes into effect.
- 1863 - 6 March: Rally in support of the Polish January Uprising in the Russian Partition of Poland, attended by a number of Swedish parliamentarians; fundraising for arms for the Polish insurgents.
- 1863–1864: Rudberg and Gillis Bildt develop a city plan for Stockholm. Albert Lindhagen is appointed head of a commission to examine the plan the following year, only to produce a plan of his own in 1866. The plan, published in 1867, results in no actions.
- 1866: General Industrial Exposition of Stockholm (1866).
- 1868: Foundation of the factory Barnängens Tekniska Fabrik.
- 1871: Stockholm Central Station is inaugurated.
- 1874–80: Various plans for different districts are discussed. Three are accepted by the king.
- 1875: Foundation of the Swedish Theatre (Stockholm).
- 1877: Gumaelius advertising agency in business.
- 1878: The famous Eldkvarn fire.
  - Swedish Federation is founded to combat the prostitution regulations.
- 1879: Blanche Theatre is inaugurated.
- 1884: Inauguration of the Sophiahemmet University College.

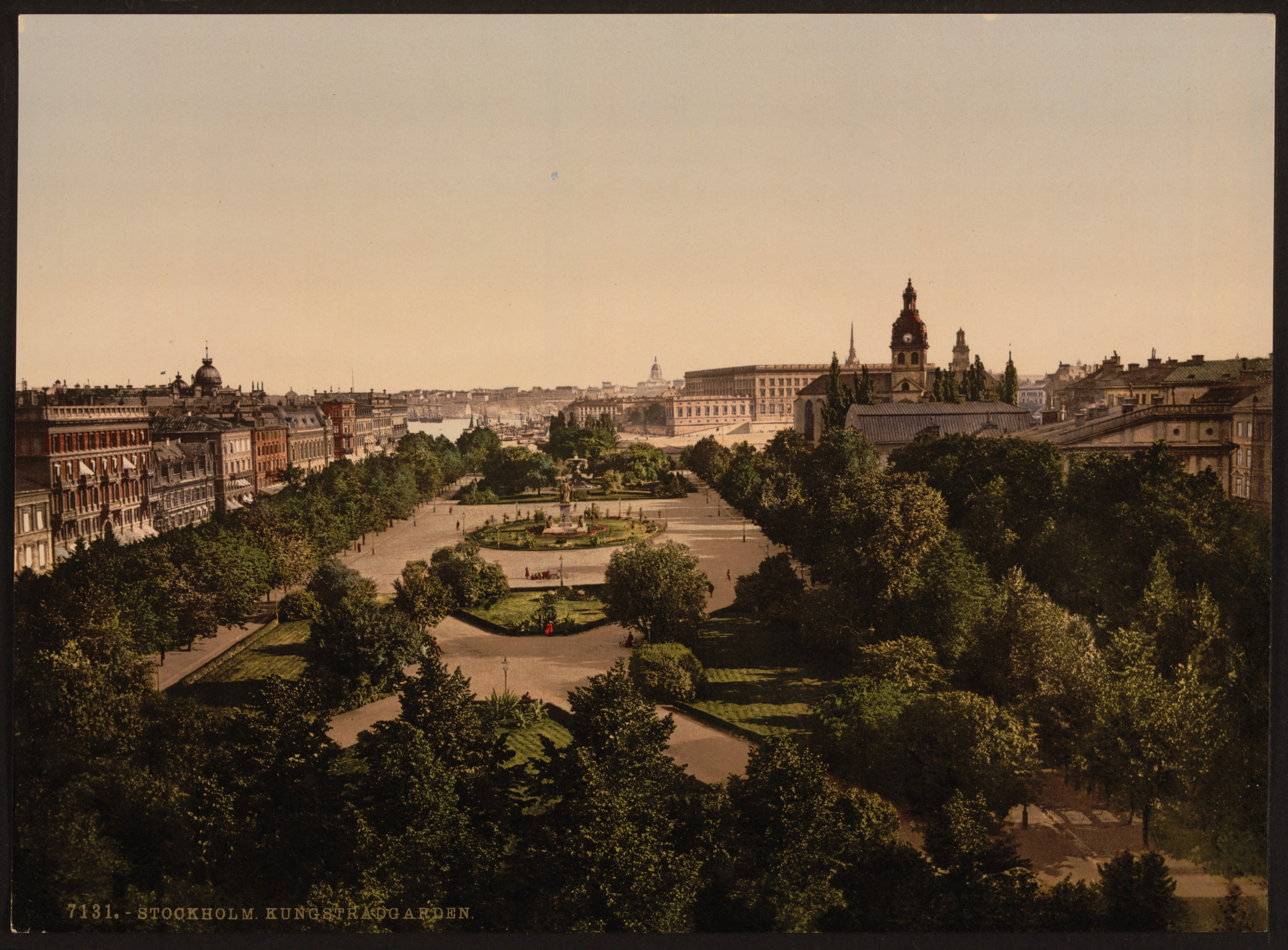
Stockholm in the 1890s

- 1894: World Allround Speed Skating Championships.
- 1897: General Art and Industrial Exposition of Stockholm (1897)
  - 1897 World Figure Skating Championships

== 20th century ==
- 1912: Stockholm hosts the 1912 Summer Olympics.
- 1917: Anti-war socialist Zimmerwald Conference held.
- 1926: Stockholm co-hosts the 1926 World Figure Skating Championships.
- 1927: Albert Lilienberg is appointed "city-planning superintendent" (stadsplanedirektör). He presents a plan for the regulation of "densely populated districts" the following year.
- 1930: Stockholm Exhibition (1930) held.
- 1932–33: International contest for a city plan for the southern part of Norrmalm.
- 1933: Stockholm co-hosts the 1933 World Figure Skating Championships.
- 1934
  - February: Stockholm co-hosts the 1934 World Figure Skating Championships.
  - October: Stockholm co-hosts the 1934 European Wrestling Championships.
- 1936: Lilienberg's plan is rejected by the Stockholm City Council. Paul Hedqvist presents an alternative plan corresponding to today's reality.
- 1938: Stockholm co-hosts the 1938 World Figure Skating Championships.
- 1945: The principal decision to carry through the Redevelopment of Norrmalm is passed on Yngve Larssons initiative, in order to facilitate the Stockholm Metro and to elongate long-debated Sveavägen down to its present end at Sergels Torg.
- 1946
  - A plan for Norrmalm similar to today's Sergels Torg is presented by Sven Markelius and David Helldén but is ignored by the city council.
  - August: City hosts the 1946 World Archery Championships.
  - October: City hosts the 1946 European Wrestling Championships.
- 1947
  - February: City hosts the 1947 World Figure Skating Championships.
  - Summer: City hosts the 1947 ISSF World Shooting Championships.

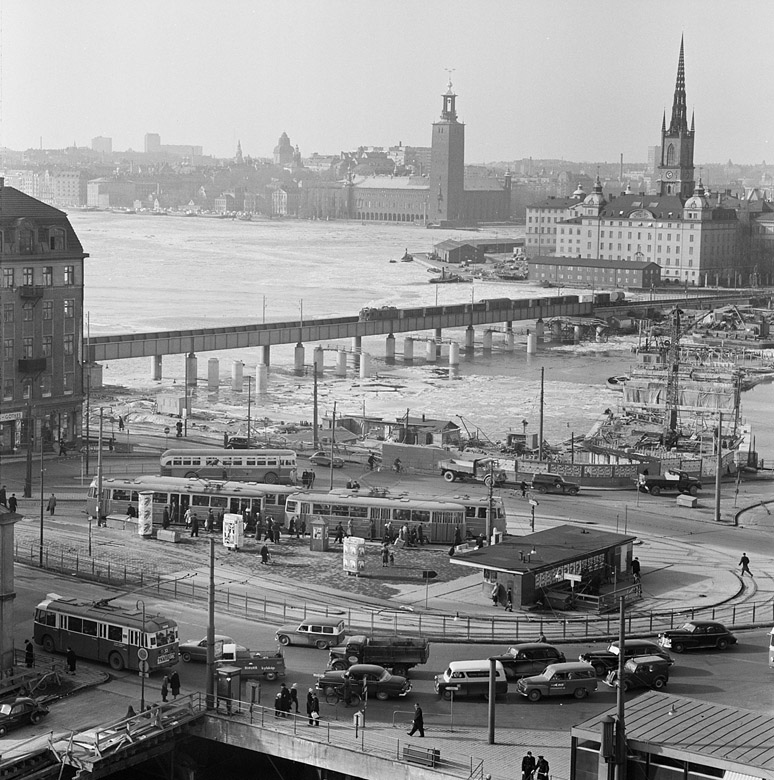
Stockholm in the 1950s

- 1951–1952: A new plan is passed and demolition works for the Stockholm Metro begin.
- 1960: Final proposal for Sergels Torg is accepted by the council.
- 1962: Stockholm Arlanda Airport established.
- 1962 and 1967: Revised plans enlarging earlier demolition plans are presented and accepted.
- 1966: Stockholm International Peace Research Institute established.
- 1971: The tree-hugger campaign Almstriden in Kungsträdgården.
- 1973
  - The Norrmalmstorg robbery hostage crisis occurred at Norrmalmstorg, eventually giving birth the term Stockholm syndrome.
  - Polish Institute in Stockholm established.
- 1975
  - New plan cancels all earlier plans to rebuild central Stockholm.
  - City hosts the Eurovision Song Contest 1975.
- 1982: The European Court passes a sentence over the expropriations in connection to the destruction of southern Norrmalm, making Sweden the first Nordic country to be sentenced for offending human rights.
- 1986: Prime minister Olof Palme is assassinated on Sveavägen.
- 1993
  - March: City co-hosts the 1993 World Men's Handball Championship.
  - July: City hosts the 1993 European Baseball Championship.
- 1997: Czech Centre in Stockholm established.

== 21st century ==
- 2000: City hosts the Eurovision Song Contest 2000.
- 2002: City co-hosts the 2002 European Men's Handball Championship.
- 2003
  - September: Minister for Foreign Affairs Anna Lindh is assassinated at the NK department store.
  - September: City co-hosts the EuroBasket 2003.
- 2006: City co-hosts the 2006 European Women's Handball Championship.
- 2009: Västberga helicopter robbery.
- 2010: Bombings.
- 2015: City hosts the 2015 European Figure Skating Championships.
- 2016
  - City co-hosts the 2016 European Women's Handball Championship.
  - City hosts the Eurovision Song Contest 2016.
- 2017: Terrorist truck attack.
- 2020: City co-hosts the 2020 European Men's Handball Championship.

== Historical population ==
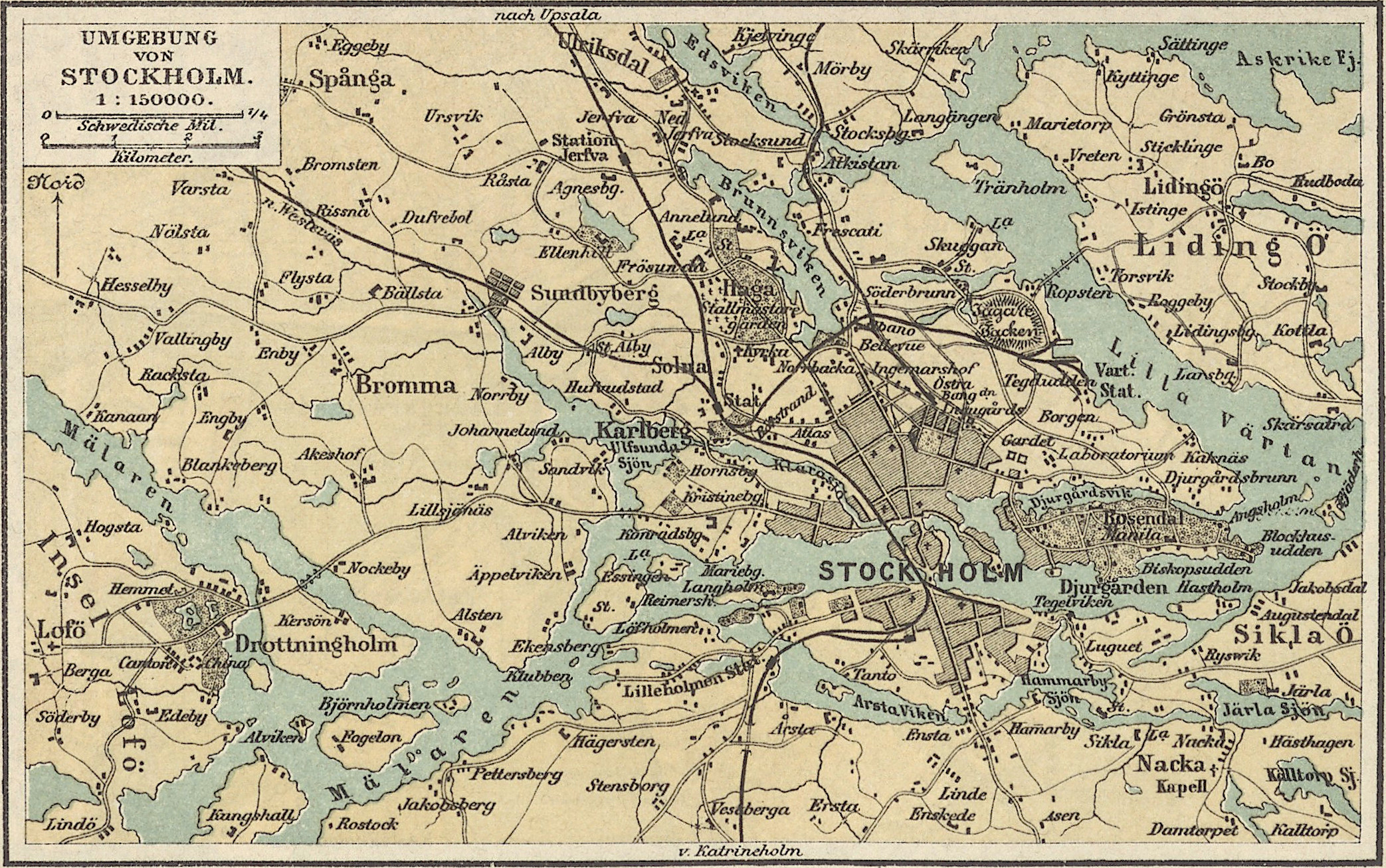
An 1890 German map of Stockholm.

Year	Inhabitants
1252	100
1289	3,000
1460	6,000
1500	7,000
1523	3,000
1582	9,000
1650	30,000
1685	60,000
1700	40,000
1750	58,400
1800	75,800
1850	93,000
1875	145,000
1900	300,500
1925	442,500
1950	744,500
1960	808,600
1970	744,900
1980	647,200
1990	674,500
2000	750,300
2004	765,000

== See also ==
- Sweden
- History of Sweden
- Timelines of other municipalities in Sweden: Gothenburg, Uppsala
