= Slottsskogsvallen =

Stadium in Sweden

Coordinates: 57°40′40″N 11°56′22″E

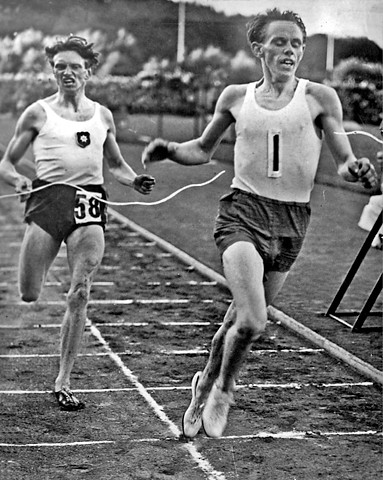
- Gunder Hägg sets a new world record at Slottsskogsvallen, 1 July 1942. The runner to the left is Arne Andersson.
- Interactive map of Slottsskogsvallen
- Location: Gothenburg, Sweden
- Type: sports ground

Construction
- Opened: 12 May 1923

Tenant
- Kopparbergs/Göteborg FC

Slottsskogsvallen (Swedish: [ˈslɔ̂tːskuːɡsˌvalːɛn], "The Castle Forest Field") is a multi-use stadium in Gothenburg, Sweden. It is currently used mostly for football and athletics. It was the home ground of Kopparbergs/Göteborg FC until 2006. The stadium has a capacity of 8,480, and was built in 1923. It is considered one of the most beautiful arenas in Sweden. It hosted the second Women's World Games in 1926. The Swedish athlete Gunder Hägg started his record-breaking streak at Slotsskogsvallen in 1942. The annual half marathon race, Göteborgsvarvet, the world's largest half marathon race, finishes in the arena. The annual Göteborg Marathon starts and finishes in the arena.
