= 2018 Sweden vehicle fire attacks =

Series of arson attacks in Sweden

On the evening of 13 August 2018 in Sweden, 89 vehicles were set on fire in several districts in Gothenburg and Trollhättan, in what police assumed was a coordinated attack. In total, 11 different locations were targeted. In Trollhättan, a road was barricaded and rocks were thrown at police. The unidentified assailants were described as "youth". There were no injured persons and nobody was apprehended at the scenes. In Trollhättan, Police had "concerned dialogues" with youths that were at the scene without taking part, and with their parents. The following day, two individuals were arrested on suspicion of aggravated arson. The following night, five cars were set on fire in Mölndal, Borås, Vänersborg and Frölunda. A third suspect, 18 years old, was arrested in Turkey when he tried to enter that country. He had planned to travel to Antalya, but was stopped at the border to Turkey as police in Sweden had issued an alert which prevented his entry to that country and he was locked into a cell in the transit area. He was later transferred to Denmark.

Swedish prime minister Stefan Löfven visited the affected Tynnered district.

A 20-year-old suspect was detained for three months but was released.

In November 2018, a suspect described as young and male was arrested for participation in the extensive vandalism.

In February 2019, arson attacks were noted in the annual report of the Swedish Institute. The report noted that the arson attacks had been internationally noted in English-language and Spanish-language alternative media which tended to be critical of immigration.
