= Nossebro =

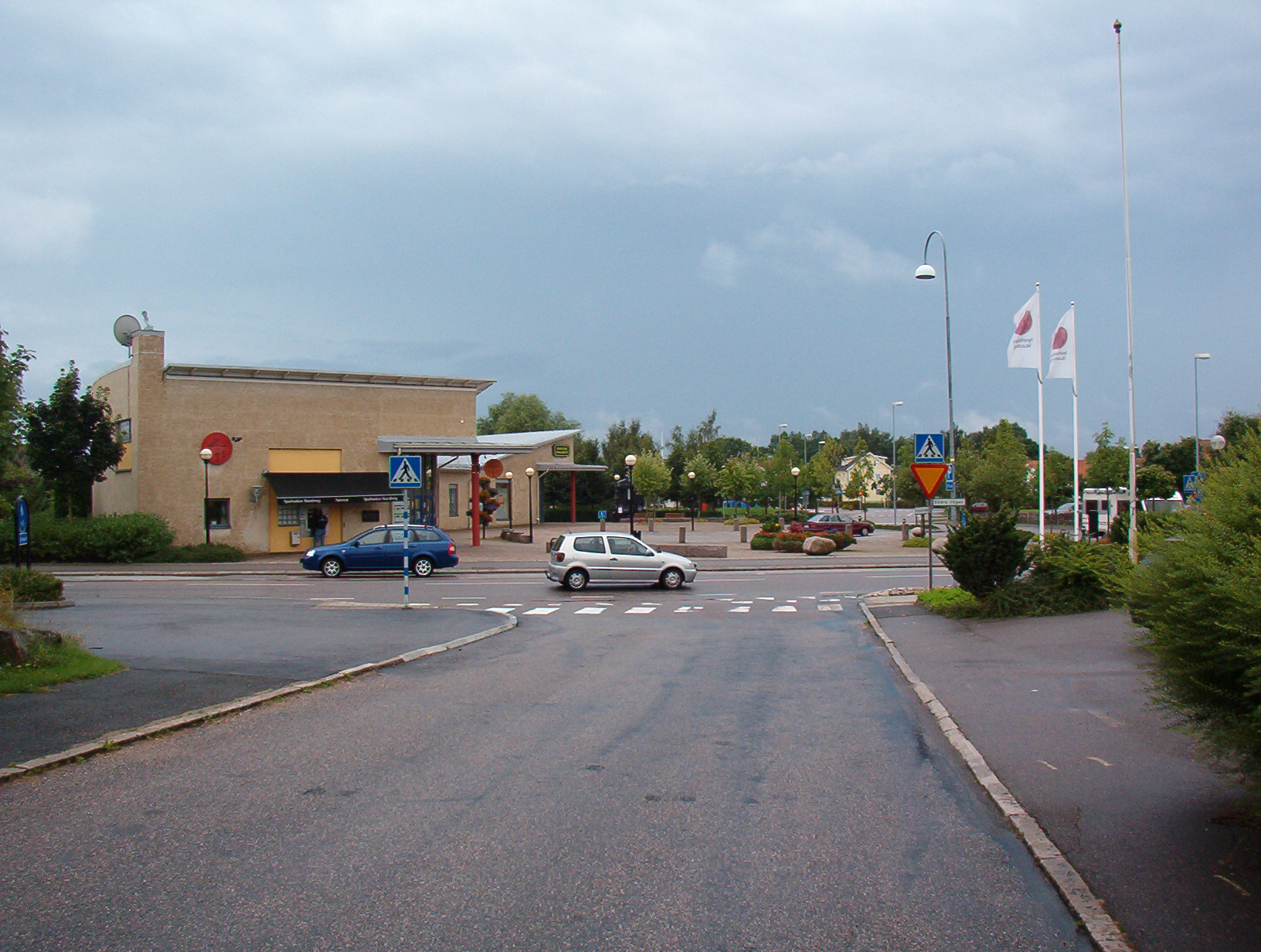
- Central Nossebro

- Location within Västra Götaland Location within Sweden
- Coordinates: 58°11′N 12°43′E
- Country: Sweden
- Province: Västergötland
- County: Västra Götaland County
- Municipality: Essunga Municipality

Area
  - Total: 1.85 km^{2} (0.71 sq mi)

Population (31 December 2010)
  - Total: 1,846
  - Density: 1,000/km^{2} (2,600/sq mi)
- Time zone: UTC+1 (CET)
  - Summer (DST): UTC+2 (CEST)

Nossebro is a locality and the seat of Essunga Municipality in Västra Götaland County, Sweden. It had 1,846 inhabitants in 2010.
