= Gothenburg Marathon =

Road running event in Gothenburg, Sweden

- Location: Göteborg, Sweden
- Event type: marathon running competition
- Established: 1972
- Website: ny.solvikingarna.se

Göteborg Marathon is an annual marathon running competition in Gothenburg, the second-largest city in Sweden, organized by the local athletics club Solvikingarna.

The race was first held in 1972, and has since been an annual event except for 1973 and 1986. Classes for the half marathon distance were added in 1996 to help finance the event.

The race takes place in October, and is currently the third largest marathon in Sweden. The start and finish is in the old athletics arena Slottsskogsvallen in Slottsskogen park. The course goes southwards to a turning point at the sea and returns the same way. The half marathoners run one lap, while the marathon race consists of two. The course is relatively flat, but winds along the sea can be significant.
