= List of municipalities of Sweden =

This is a list of the 290 municipalities of Sweden.

== List ==
Code is the municipality code. Population statistics are as of 2025.

‡ County seat

Municipalities of Sweden
Code	Municipality	Seat	County	Population	Land area (km^{2})	Density
1440	Ale	Nödinge	Västra Götaland	32,620	316.99	102.4
1489	Alingsås	Alingsås	Västra Götaland	42,861	471.91	90.4
0764	Alvesta	Alvesta	Kronoberg	19,687	973.78	20.1
0604	Aneby	Aneby	Jönköping	6,851	517.67	13.2
1984	Arboga	Arboga	Västmanland	13,929	325.20	42.6
2506	Arjeplog	Arjeplog	Norrbotten	2,570	12,556.48	0.2
2505	Arvidsjaur	Arvidsjaur	Norrbotten	6,026	5,655.47	1.1
1784	Arvika	Arvika	Värmland	25,408	1,650.53	15.3
1882	Askersund	Askersund	Örebro	11,382	816.83	13.9
2084	Avesta	Avesta	Dalarna	22,366	613.14	36.3
1460	Bengtsfors	Bengtsfors	Västra Götaland	8,955	882.96	10.1
2326	Berg	Svenstavik	Jämtland	7,085	5,710.10	1.2
2403	Bjurholm	Bjurholm	Västerbotten	2,327	1,306.69	1.8
1260	Bjuv	Bjuv	Skåne	16,052	115.34	138.6
2582	Boden	Boden	Norrbotten	28,624	4,014.00	7.1
1443	Bollebygd	Bollebygd	Västra Götaland	9,784	263.31	37.0
2183	Bollnäs	Bollnäs	Gävleborg	26,018	1,814.01	14.3
0885	Borgholm	Borgholm	Kalmar	10,626	676,76	15.6
2081	Borlänge	Borlänge	Dalarna	51,354	583.88	87.5
1490	Borås	Borås	Västra Götaland	115,238	909.82	126.1
0127	Botkyrka	Tumba	Stockholm	96,750	194.01	496.1
0560	Boxholm	Boxholm	Östergötland	5,451	525.71	10.3
1272	Bromölla	Bromölla	Skåne	12,497	162.53	76.6
2305	Bräcke	Bräcke	Jämtland	5,950	3,408.12	1.7
1231	Burlöv	Arlöv	Skåne	20,444	18.90	1,077.1
1278	Båstad	Båstad	Skåne	16,046	207.09	73.6
1438	Dals-Ed	Ed	Västra Götaland	4,571	724.07	6.3
0162	Danderyd	Djursholm	Stockholm	32,500	26.37	1,226.0
1862	Degerfors	Degerfors	Örebro	9,237	383.94	23.9
2425	Dorotea	Dorotea	Västerbotten	2,241	2,764.49	0.8
1730	Eda	Charlottenberg	Värmland	8,289	820.15	10.1
0125	Ekerö	Ekerö	Stockholm	29,062	217.33	133.0
0686	Eksjö	Eksjö	Jönköping	17,660	799.29	22.0
0862	Emmaboda	Emmaboda	Kalmar	8,807	689.47	12.7
0381	Enköping	Enköping	Uppsala	48,804	1,178.16	41.2
0484	Eskilstuna	Eskilstuna	Södermanland	106,789	1,098.99	96.7
1285	Eslöv	Eslöv	Skåne	35,126	418.91	83.5
1445	Essunga	Nossebro	Västra Götaland	5,559	234,53	23.6
1982	Fagersta	Fagersta	Västmanland	12,915	269.03	47.8
1382	Falkenberg	Falkenberg	Halland	47,321	1,108.14	42.5
1499	Falköping	Falköping	Västra Götaland	32,794	1,044.77	31.2
2080	Falun	Falun ‡	Dalarna	59,974	2,039.80	29.3
1782	Filipstad	Filipstad	Värmland	9,625	1,533.99	6.2
0562	Finspång	Finspång	Östergötland	21,502	1,055.20	20.3
0482	Flen	Flen	Södermanland	15,095	717.83	20.9
1763	Forshaga	Forshaga	Värmland	11,439	348.21	32.7
1439	Färgelanda	Färgelanda	Västra Götaland	6,288	588.92	10.6
2026	Gagnef	Djurås	Dalarna	10,307	767.20	13.4
0662	Gislaved	Gislaved	Jönköping	28,641	1,136.91	25.1
0461	Gnesta	Gnesta	Södermanland	11,343	460.86	24.5
0617	Gnosjö	Gnosjö	Jönköping	9,010	420.48	21.3
1480	Gothenburg	Gothenburg ‡	Västra Götaland	613,278	447.84	1,362.2
0980	Gotland	Visby ‡	Gotland	60,852	3,134.00	19.3
1764	Grums	Grums	Värmland	8,854	386.36	22.8
1444	Grästorp	Grästorp	Västra Götaland	5,602	264.43	21.1
1447	Gullspång	Hova	Västra Götaland	4,949	316.04	15.6
2523	Gällivare	Gällivare	Norrbotten	17,135	15,690.83	1.1
2180	Gävle	Gävle ‡	Gävleborg	104,108	1,612.99	64.2
1471	Götene	Götene	Västra Götaland	13,223	404.79	32.5
0643	Habo	Habo	Jönköping	13,511	328.40	41.0
1783	Hagfors	Hagfors	Värmland	11,324	1,824.37	6.2
1861	Hallsberg	Hallsberg	Örebro	16,082	636.73	25.1
1961	Hallstahammar	Hallstahammar	Västmanland	16,600	169.58	97.4
1380	Halmstad	Halmstad ‡	Halland	106,315	1,013.71	104.4
1761	Hammarö	Skoghall	Värmland	16,932	59.80	281.8
0136	Haninge	Handen	Stockholm	101,408	455.35	221.5
2583	Haparanda	Haparanda	Norrbotten	9,027	921.00	9.7
0331	Heby	Heby	Uppsala	14,275	1,166.72	12.2
2083	Hedemora	Hedemora	Dalarna	15,025	835.50	17.9
1283	Helsingborg	Helsingborg	Skåne	152,776	343.59	442.8
1466	Herrljunga	Herrljunga	Västra Götaland	9,509	497.38	19.0
1497	Hjo	Hjo	Västra Götaland	9,322	296.95	31.3
2104	Hofors	Hofors	Gävleborg	9,138	409.87	22.2
0126	Huddinge	Huddinge	Stockholm	144,686	130.85	871.8
2184	Hudiksvall	Hudiksvall	Gävleborg	37,341	2,486.84	14.9
0860	Hultsfred	Hultsfred	Kalmar	13,484	1,121.53	12.0
1315	Hylte	Hyltebruk	Halland	10,094	946.59	10.6
0305	Håbo	Bålsta	Uppsala	23,252	143.48	161.3
1863	Hällefors	Hällefors	Örebro	6,269	984.97	6.3
2361	Härjedalen	Sveg	Jämtland	10,117	11,283.67	0.9
2280	Härnösand	Härnösand ‡	Västernorrland	24,348	1,058.27	22.9
1401	Härryda	Mölnlycke	Västra Götaland	40,011	266.65	149.3
1293	Hässleholm	Hässleholm	Skåne	51,915	1,269.41	40.7
1284	Höganäs	Höganäs	Skåne	28,489	143.48	197.7
0821	Högsby	Högsby	Kalmar	5,134	750.60	6.8
1266	Hörby	Hörby	Skåne	15,559	419.18	37.0
1267	Höör	Höör	Skåne	17,680	290.50	60.6
2510	Jokkmokk	Jokkmokk	Norrbotten	4,695	17,599.69	0.3
0123	Järfälla	Jakobsberg	Stockholm	90,180	53.78	1,668.1
0680	Jönköping	Jönköping ‡	Jönköping	148,152	1,479.85	99.7
2514	Kalix	Kalix	Norrbotten	15,252	1,803.15	8.4
0880	Kalmar	Kalmar ‡	Kalmar	73,068	956.15	76.1
1446	Karlsborg	Karlsborg	Västra Götaland	7,047	405.88	17.3
1082	Karlshamn	Karlshamn	Blekinge	31,642	488.55	64.5
1883	Karlskoga	Karlskoga	Örebro	30,128	468.30	64.0
1080	Karlskrona	Karlskrona ‡	Blekinge	66,021	1,042.52	63.1
1780	Karlstad	Karlstad ‡	Värmland	99,007	1,169.31	84.3
0483	Katrineholm	Katrineholm	Södermanland	33,984	1,019.49	33.2
1715	Kil	Kil	Värmland	12,024	359.73	33.3
0513	Kinda	Kisa	Östergötland	9,924	1,129.34	8.7
2584	Kiruna	Kiruna	Norrbotten	22,402	19,161.65	1.2
1276	Klippan	Klippan	Skåne	17,713	374.20	47.1
0330	Knivsta	Knivsta	Uppsala	21,733	282.13	76.6
2282	Kramfors	Kramfors	Västernorrland	17,390	1,694.62	10.2
1290	Kristianstad	Kristianstad	Skåne	85,908	1,244.45	68.8
1781	Kristinehamn	Kristinehamn	Värmland	23,590	756.63	31.0
2309	Krokom	Krokom	Jämtland	15,795	6,154.26	2.6
1881	Kumla	Kumla	Örebro	22,665	203.64	110.8
1384	Kungsbacka	Kungsbacka	Halland	86,332	606.32	141.7
1960	Kungsör	Kungsör	Västmanland	8,550	202.53	42.0
1482	Kungälv	Kungälv	Västra Götaland	50,496	362.50	138.6
1261	Kävlinge	Kävlinge	Skåne	32,655	154.44	213.3
1983	Köping	Köping	Västmanland	25,610	604.23	42.2
1381	Laholm	Laholm	Halland	26,565	882.55	30.0
1282	Landskrona	Landskrona	Skåne	47,571	140.21	338.0
1860	Laxå	Laxå	Örebro	5,397	601.90	8.9
1814	Lekeberg	Fjugesta	Örebro	8,608	463.09	18.5
2029	Leksand	Leksand	Dalarna	16,167	1,221.56	13.2
1441	Lerum	Lerum	Västra Götaland	43,752	258.51	168.4
0761	Lessebo	Lessebo	Kronoberg	8,115	412.55	19.6
0186	Lidingö	Lidingö	Stockholm	48,369	30.69	1,566.9
1494	Lidköping	Lidköping	Västra Götaland	40,359	697.17	57.6
1462	Lilla Edet	Lilla Edet	Västra Götaland	14,398	315.59	45.4
1885	Lindesberg	Lindesberg	Örebro	23,014	1,377.52	16.6
0580	Linköping	Linköping ‡	Östergötland	168,714	1,427.30	117.7
0781	Ljungby	Ljungby	Kronoberg	28,132	1,747.93	16.0
2161	Ljusdal	Ljusdal	Gävleborg	18,377	5,256.45	3.5
1864	Ljusnarsberg	Kopparberg	Örebro	4,290	575.59	7.4
1262	Lomma	Lomma	Skåne	24,677	55.49	442.9
2085	Ludvika	Ludvika	Dalarna	26,812	1,490.39	17.9
2580	Luleå	Luleå ‡	Norrbotten	80,304	2,088.82	38.1
1281	Lund	Lund	Skåne	132,333	426.67	309.0
2481	Lycksele	Lycksele	Västerbotten	12,159	5,518.31	2.2
1484	Lysekil	Lysekil	Västra Götaland	13,796	208.44	65.8
1280	Malmö	Malmö ‡	Skåne	367,924	156.82	2,336.8
2023	Malung-Sälen	Malung	Dalarna	10,192	4,084.94	2.5
2418	Malå	Malå	Västerbotten	2,902	1,598.20	1.8
1493	Mariestad	Mariestad	Västra Götaland	24,421	603.74	40.3
1463	Mark	Kinna	Västra Götaland	35,134	929.28	37.6
0767	Markaryd	Markaryd	Kronoberg	9,862	517.07	19.0
1461	Mellerud	Mellerud	Västra Götaland	9,038	513.62	17.5
0586	Mjölby	Mjölby	Östergötland	28,823	546.85	52.5
2062	Mora	Mora	Dalarna	20,419	2,812.45	7.2
0583	Motala	Motala	Östergötland	43,131	982.72	43.7
0642	Mullsjö	Mullsjö	Jönköping	7,546	200.09	37.5
1430	Munkedal	Munkedal	Västra Götaland	10,272	633.93	16.1
1762	Munkfors	Munkfors	Värmland	3,637	141.58	25.6
1481	Mölndal	Mölndal	Västra Götaland	72,128	145.88	491.9
0861	Mönsterås	Mönsterås	Kalmar	12,978	598.84	21.6
0840	Mörbylånga	Mörbylånga	Kalmar	16,306	666.05	24.4
0182	Nacka	Nacka	Stockholm	113,730	94.79	1,193.3
1884	Nora	Nora	Örebro	10,603	618.57	17.1
1962	Norberg	Norberg	Västmanland	5,351	417.86	12.7
2132	Nordanstig	Bergsjö	Gävleborg	9,284	1,370.10	6.7
2401	Nordmaling	Nordmaling	Västerbotten	6,905	1,230.56	5.6
0581	Norrköping	Norrköping	Östergötland	144,904	1,494.44	96.5
0188	Norrtälje	Norrtälje	Stockholm	66,832	2,014.83	33.0
2417	Norsjö	Norsjö	Västerbotten	3,811	1,739.16	2.2
0881	Nybro	Nybro	Kalmar	19,803	1,171.68	16.8
0140	Nykvarn	Nykvarn	Stockholm	12,384	152.62	80.7
0480	Nyköping	Nyköping ‡	Södermanland	58,310	1,418.06	40.9
0192	Nynäshamn	Nynäshamn	Stockholm	30,610	356.99	85.3
0682	Nässjö	Nässjö	Jönköping	31,474	930.05	33.7
2101	Ockelbo	Ockelbo	Gävleborg	5,715	1,064.65	5.3
1060	Olofström	Olofström	Blekinge	12,844	389.74	32.8
2034	Orsa	Orsa	Dalarna	6,902	1,730.75	4.0
1421	Orust	Henån	Västra Götaland	15,363	386.49	39.5
1273	Osby	Osby	Skåne	12,861	575.11	22.3
0882	Oskarshamn	Oskarshamn	Kalmar	26,762	1,045.66	25.5
2121	Ovanåker	Edsbyn	Gävleborg	11,272	1,873.28	6.0
0481	Oxelösund	Oxelösund	Södermanland	11,962	34.96	340.5
2521	Pajala	Pajala	Norrbotten	5,706	7,839.52	0.7
1402	Partille	Partille	Västra Götaland	41,164	56.82	720.8
1275	Perstorp	Perstorp	Skåne	7,115	158.83	44.6
2581	Piteå	Piteå	Norrbotten	42,184	3,086.15	13.6
2303	Ragunda	Hammarstrand	Jämtland	5,152	2,511.10	2.0
2409	Robertsfors	Robertsfors	Västerbotten	6,595	1,292.34	5.1
1081	Ronneby	Ronneby	Blekinge	28,708	825.12	34.7
2031	Rättvik	Rättvik	Dalarna	10,978	1,920.81	5.7
1981	Sala	Sala	Västmanland	22,600	1,166.87	19.3
0128	Salem	Salem	Stockholm	17,370	54.10	319.4
2181	Sandviken	Sandviken	Gävleborg	38,033	1,165.46	32.5
0191	Sigtuna	Märsta	Stockholm	53,365	327.56	162.0
1291	Simrishamn	Simrishamn	Skåne	18,779	392.27	47.7
1265	Sjöbo	Sjöbo	Skåne	19,397	491.75	39.3
1495	Skara	Skara	Västra Götaland	18,753	428.40	43.6
2482	Skellefteå	Skellefteå	Västerbotten	75,405	6,802.34	11.0
1904	Skinnskatteberg	Skinnskatteberg	Västmanland	4,234	659.39	6.4
1264	Skurup	Skurup	Skåne	17,139	193.37	88.3
1496	Skövde	Skövde	Västra Götaland	58,272	673.55	86.1
2061	Smedjebacken	Smedjebacken	Dalarna	10,758	947.97	11.3
2283	Sollefteå	Sollefteå	Västernorrland	18,138	5,398.48	3.3
0163	Sollentuna	Sollentuna	Stockholm	78,033	52.60	1,475.4
0184	Solna	Solna	Stockholm	86,435	19.27	4,462.3
2422	Sorsele	Sorsele	Västerbotten	2,362	7,366.19	0.3
1427	Sotenäs	Kungshamn	Västra Götaland	9,036	138.19	65.0
1230	Staffanstorp	Staffanstorp	Skåne	27,482	106.78	256.4
1415	Stenungsund	Stenungsund	Västra Götaland	27,854	251.83	110.0
0180	Stockholm	Stockholm ‡	Stockholm	999,239	187.22	5,308.9
1760	Storfors	Storfors	Värmland	3,777	391.72	9.6
2421	Storuman	Storuman	Västerbotten	5,543	7,298.24	0.8
0486	Strängnäs	Strängnäs	Södermanland	39,387	739.00	53.0
1486	Strömstad	Strömstad	Västra Götaland	13,557	467.46	28.8
2313	Strömsund	Strömsund	Jämtland	10,904	10,464.12	1.0
0183	Sundbyberg	Hallonbergen	Stockholm	57,000	8.68	6,529.2
2281	Sundsvall	Sundsvall	Västernorrland	98,962	3,189.26	30.9
1766	Sunne	Sunne	Värmland	13,354	1,287.97	10.3
1907	Surahammar	Surahammar	Västmanland	9,733	343.94	28.2
1214	Svalöv	Svalöv	Skåne	14,474	386.73	37.3
1263	Svedala	Svedala	Skåne	23,714	217.61	108.6
1465	Svenljunga	Svenljunga	Västra Götaland	10,616	919.61	11.5
1785	Säffle	Säffle	Värmland	14,756	1,225.93	12.0
2082	Säter	Säter	Dalarna	12,222	570.29	19.6
0684	Sävsjö	Sävsjö	Jönköping	11,531	678.91	16.9
2182	Söderhamn	Söderhamn	Gävleborg	24,163	1,059.43	22.7
0582	Söderköping	Söderköping	Östergötland	14,741	673.24	21.8
0181	Södertälje	Södertälje	Stockholm	102,772	523.93	195.2
1083	Sölvesborg	Sölvesborg	Blekinge	17,405	185.25	93.6
1435	Tanum	Tanumshede	Västra Götaland	12,677	917.16	13.7
1472	Tibro	Tibro	Västra Götaland	11,326	219.80	51.3
1498	Tidaholm	Tidaholm	Västra Götaland	12,736	517.87	24.5
0360	Tierp	Tierp	Uppsala	21,028	1,539.90	13.6
2262	Timrå	Timrå	Västernorrland	17,465	783.22	22.2
0763	Tingsryd	Tingsryd	Kronoberg	11,896	1,044.49	11.3
1419	Tjörn	Skärhamn	Västra Götaland	16,003	167.32	95.1
1270	Tomelilla	Tomelilla	Skåne	13,669	396.00	34.4
1737	Torsby	Torsby	Värmland	11,278	4,162.29	2.7
0834	Torsås	Torsås	Kalmar	6,919	468.36	14.7
1452	Tranemo	Tranemo	Västra Götaland	11,873	741.07	16.0
0687	Tranås	Tranås	Jönköping	18,555	402.52	45.9
1287	Trelleborg	Trelleborg	Skåne	47,405	340.10	138.8
1488	Trollhättan	Trollhättan	Västra Götaland	59,265	409.60	144.0
0488	Trosa	Trosa	Södermanland	14,900	209.07	70.9
0138	Tyresö	Tyresö	Stockholm	49,645	69.18	713.7
0160	Täby	Täby	Stockholm	78,514	60.68	1,287.1
1473	Töreboda	Töreboda	Västra Götaland	9,093	540.69	16.7
1485	Uddevalla	Uddevalla	Västra Götaland	56,744	637.60	88.5
1491	Ulricehamn	Ulricehamn	Västra Götaland	24,954	1,045.68	23.8
2480	Umeå	Umeå ‡	Västerbotten	135,273	2,317.03	58.0
0114	Upplands Väsby	Upplands Väsby	Stockholm	50,495	74.99	669.9
0139	Upplands-Bro	Kungsängen	Stockholm	33,333	235.16	141.0
0380	Uppsala	Uppsala ‡	Uppsala	249,726	2,182.09	113.8
0760	Uppvidinge	Åseda	Kronoberg	8,911	1,171.85	7.6
0584	Vadstena	Vadstena	Östergötland	7,484	191.55	38.9
0665	Vaggeryd	Vaggeryd and Skillingaryd (Note: The neighboring towns of Vaggeryd and Skillingaryd act as joint seat, with the town hall in Skillingaryd; however, the municipal administration fully evacuated the town hall in August 2025 due to mold. In March 2026 temporary offices were established in rented space in the small locality Södra Stigamo; however, a couple weeks later, the company renting the space went bankrupt, and as of May 2026 it is unclear where the municipality will house its main offices.)	Jönköping	14,943	824.81	18.0
0563	Valdemarsvik	Valdemarsvik	Östergötland	7,526	733.55	10.2
0115	Vallentuna	Vallentuna	Stockholm	35,361	357.65	98.3
2021	Vansbro	Vansbro	Dalarna	6,741	1,540.02	4.4
1470	Vara	Vara	Västra Götaland	16,011	696.80	22.9
1383	Varberg	Varberg	Halland	69,460	868.75	79.6
0187	Vaxholm	Vaxholm	Stockholm	11,636	57.61	200.9
1233	Vellinge	Vellinge	Skåne	37,833	142.55	264.2
0685	Vetlanda	Vetlanda	Jönköping	27,313	1,500.16	18.1
2462	Vilhelmina	Vilhelmina	Västerbotten	6,172	8,047.01	0.8
0884	Vimmerby	Vimmerby	Kalmar	15,327	1,139.94	13.4
2404	Vindeln	Vindeln	Västerbotten	5,421	2,630.10	2.0
0428	Vingåker	Vingåker	Södermanland	8,666	370.33	23.3
1442	Vårgårda	Vårgårda	Västra Götaland	12,472	426.57	29.1
1487	Vänersborg	Vänersborg	Västra Götaland	40,078	643.49	62.0
2460	Vännäs	Vännäs	Västerbotten	9,225	529.51	17.3
0120	Värmdö	Gustavsberg	Stockholm	46,601	443.99	104.4
0683	Värnamo	Värnamo	Jönköping	34,534	1,216.00	28.3
0883	Västervik	Västervik	Kalmar	36,269	1,873.61	19.3
1980	Västerås	Västerås ‡	Västmanland	161,240	957.85	167.5
0780	Växjö	Växjö ‡	Kronoberg	98,940	1,664.95	59.2
0512	Ydre	Österbymo	Östergötland	3,619	675.32	5.3
1286	Ystad	Ystad	Skåne	32,188	350.05	91.7
1492	Åmål	Åmål	Västra Götaland	11,679	480.29	24.2
2260	Ånge	Ånge	Västernorrland	9,000	3,050.19	2.9
2321	Åre	Järpen	Jämtland	12,770	7,194.92	1.8
1765	Årjäng	Årjäng	Värmland	9,734	1,409.45	6.9
2463	Åsele	Åsele	Västerbotten	2,683	4,223.40	0.6
1277	Åstorp	Åstorp	Skåne	16,491	92.33	177.9
0561	Åtvidaberg	Åtvidaberg	Östergötland	11,490	686.32	16.7
0765	Älmhult	Älmhult	Kronoberg	17,579	890.37	19.7
2039	Älvdalen	Älvdalen	Dalarna	6,831	6,871.35	1.0
0319	Älvkarleby	Skutskär	Uppsala	9,573	220.18	43.2
2560	Älvsbyn	Älvsbyn	Norrbotten	7,815	1,699.35	4.6
1292	Ängelholm	Ängelholm	Skåne	45,159	419.74	107.1
1407	Öckerö	Öckerö	Västra Götaland	12,863	25.75	496.8
0509	Ödeshög	Ödeshög	Östergötland	5,221	433.82	12.0
1880	Örebro	Örebro ‡	Örebro	160,687	1,372.30	116.6
1257	Örkelljunga	Örkelljunga	Skåne	10,293	319.22	32.1
2284	Örnsköldsvik	Örnsköldsvik	Västernorrland	55,338	6,376.55	8.6
2380	Östersund	Östersund ‡	Jämtland	64,963	2,208.31	29.3
0117	Österåker	Åkersberga	Stockholm	49,943	312.24	159.1
0382	Östhammar	Östhammar	Uppsala	22,181	1,475.17	15.0
1256	Östra Göinge	Broby	Skåne	13,718	431.44	31.7
2513	Överkalix	Överkalix	Norrbotten	3,183	2,764.81	1.1
2518	Övertorneå	Övertorneå	Norrbotten	3,995	2,358.03	1.7
