= Barnängens manufaktur =

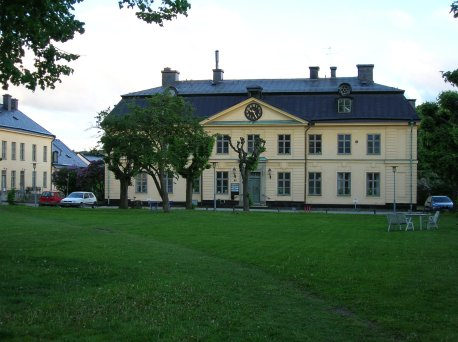
Barnängens gård

Barnängens manufaktur (literary: "Children's Meadow's Manufacture"), was a textile factory in the Barnängen ("Children's Meadow") area in Södermalm in Stockholm in Sweden, active from 1691 until 1826. Alongside its main rival Pauliska manufakturerna (The 'Paulinian Manufactures', active in 1673-1776), it was the biggest factory in Stockholm during the 18th-century, and during the 1780s, it employed more people than any other business in the city, the majority of whom were women. The factory has been fictionalized in the novel Vävarnas barn (Children of the Weavers) by Per Anders Fogelström from 1981.

== History ==
Barnängens manufaktur was founded by Jacob Gavelius, who established a textile mill at the Barnängen area in 1691.

The factory consists of several buildings: the textile mill from 1691, the textilier building from 1758, the Corps de logis from 1767, and the factory- and storage buildings from 1782.

The spinning factory used Cannabis sativa and Flax to make yarn and weave textile fabrics, and one of its most common products were canvas for sails.

=== 18th-century ===
During the 18th-century, Barnängens manufaktur was the biggest factory in the capital of Stockholm alongside its main rival Pauliska manufakturerna (The 'Paulininian Manufactures', active in 1673-1776). It employed more people than any other business in the capital. The majority of employees were female: 416 of its 529 employees in 1745 were women, and in the 1780s, it was the biggest industry in Stockholm. The workers did not always work in the factory itself, but often arranged Workshops in their homes and elsewhere in the city: this was also the case with the main competitor Pauliska manufakturerna, but in much higher degree, as the Pauliska manufakturerna, in contrast to Barnängens manufaktur, in fact had not factory at all. A normal workshop under the factory roughly consisted of one chief Journeyman and four other Journeymen; three apprentices, 21 female workers and one chief spinning mistress. The workers were not bound to the factory and known for their freedom to change between the factory depending on who paid the highest price for their work.

In 1788, the factory was on the height of hits success with 740 employees, and given large orders during the Russo-Swedish War (1788–90). However, in parallel, a great amount of competition aroused due to the establishment of textile factories all over the country, many of whom used a new mechanized technique rather than the old handicrafts method used by Barnängens manufaktur. When the bills for the orders to the royal army during the war was never paid, and the storage burned in 1792, the owner of the factory when bankrupt, which signified the end of the success of the factory.

=== Later history ===
The factory remained active, though in much smaller scale. In 1812, there were only nine employees.

In 1826, Barnängens manufaktur was finally closed. The former factory buildings housed the Hill School of correction from 1826 to 1848.

In 1868, a new factory was founded in the same area, which was given a similar name: Barnängens Tekniska Fabrik (Barnängen Technical Factory, 1868-1992), which became known for its soap.
