= Essunga Municipality =

Essunga Municipality Essunga kommun
- Municipality
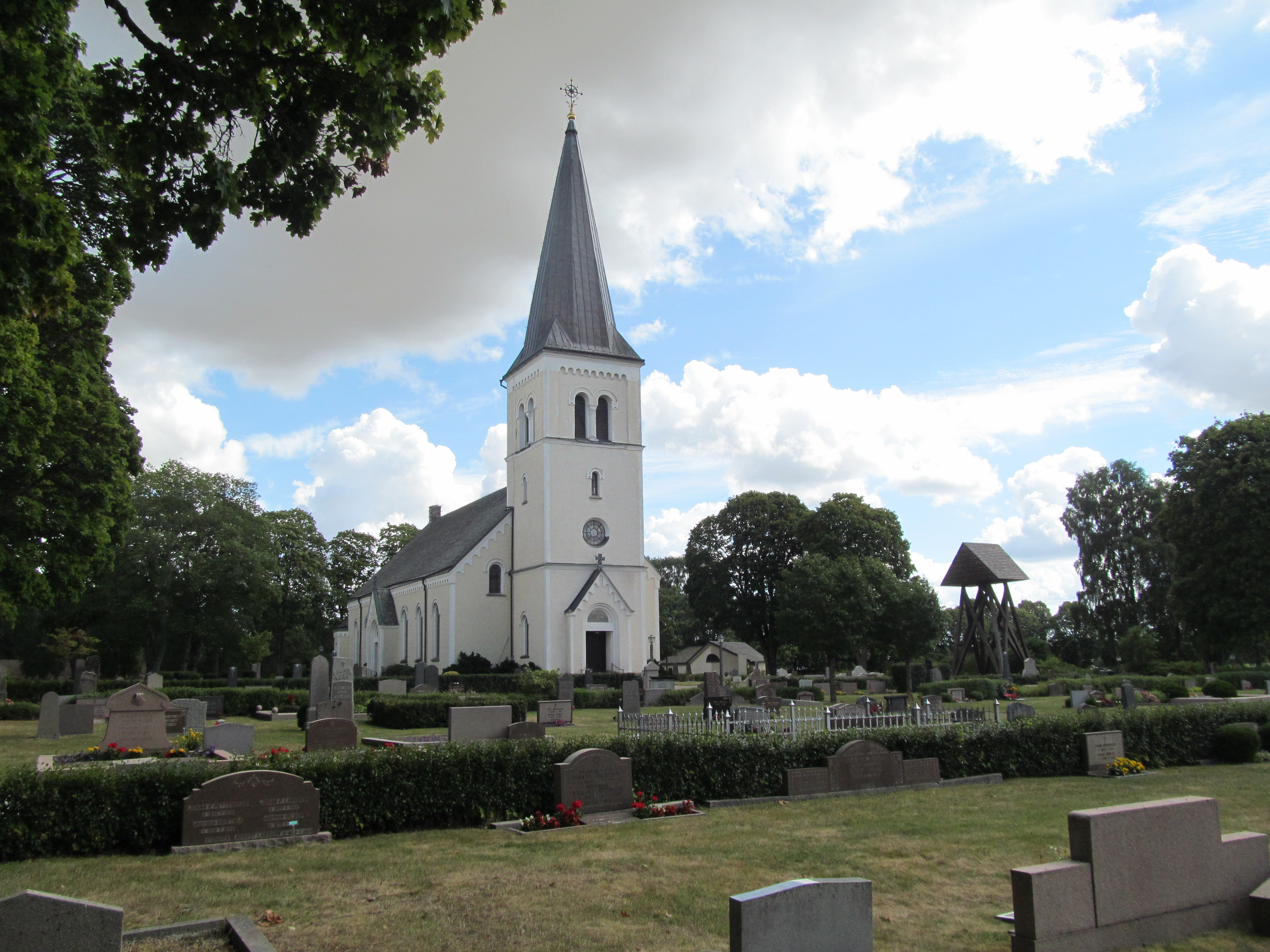

- Coat of arms

- Coordinates: 58°11′N 12°43′E
- Country: Sweden
- County: Västra Götaland County
- Seat: Nossebro

Area
  - Total: 235.73 km^{2} (91.02 sq mi)
  - Land: 234.63 km^{2} (90.59 sq mi)
  - Water: 1.1 km^{2} (0.42 sq mi)
- Area as of 1 January 2014.

Population (30 June 2025)
  - Total: 5,581
  - Density: 23.79/km^{2} (61.61/sq mi)
- Time zone: UTC+1 (CET)
  - Summer (DST): UTC+2 (CEST)
- ISO 3166 code: SE
- Province: Västergötland
- Municipal code: 1445
- Website: www.essunga.se
- Density is calculated using land area only.

Essunga Municipality (Swedish: Essunga kommun) is a municipality in Västra Götaland County in western Sweden. Its seat is located in the town of Nossebro.

The 1952 municipal reform in Sweden saw the creation of Essunga Municipality out of eight original entities. In 1974 it was dissolved and part of Vara Municipality until 1983, when it was reestablished within the boundaries of 1952. The village of Essunga is a minor settlement just east of Nossebro.

== Demographics ==
This is a demographic table based on Essunga Municipality's electoral districts in the 2022 Swedish general election sourced from SVT's election platform, in turn taken from SCB official statistics.

In total there were 5,691 residents, including 4,380 Swedish citizens of voting age. 41.1% voted for the left coalition and 58.0% for the right coalition. Indicators are in percentage points except population totals and income.

Location	Residents	Citizen adults	Left vote	Right vote	Employed	Swedish parents	Foreign heritage	Income SEK	Degree
Location			%	%					
Bredöl	1,573	1,215	40.4	58.8	85	92	8	24,870	24
Jonslund	1,823	1,397	35.4	63.9	83	91	9	25,224	25
Nossebro	2,295	1,768	46.5	52.4	78	83	17	21,590	26
Source: SVT
