= Anders Torstenson (politician) =

Swedish politician (1641–1686)

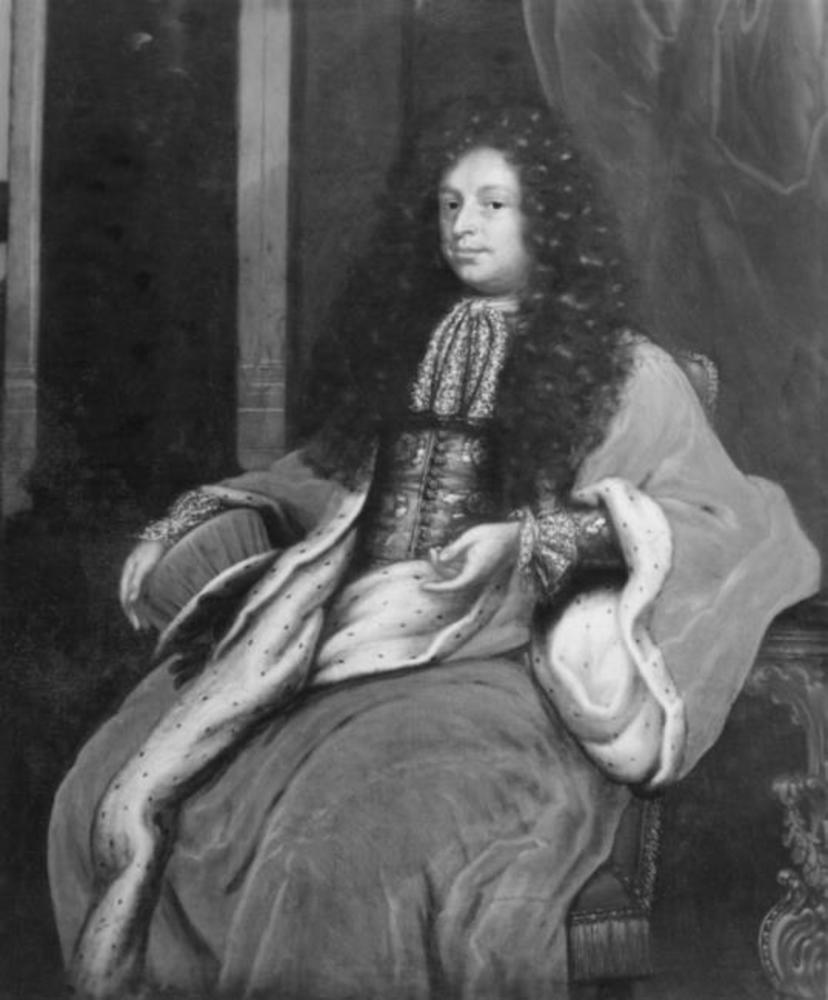
Anders Torstenson, attributed to David Klöcker Ehrenstrahl

Anders Torstenson (20 January 1641 in Stralsund – 8 November 1686 in Stockholm) was a Swedish Privy Councilor, Governor-General and Count.

== Biography ==
His father, Lennart Torstensson, was a military officer with the rank of Fältmarskalk (Field Marshal), who was later ennobled as a Count. Out of five children, he was the only one to reach adulthood. Three died as infants and his brother, Gustaf Adolf (1634-1653), was killed in a duel.

He was sent to Uppsala in 1649, to complete his primary education. Three years later, he served as a chamber page for Queen Christina. From 1659 to 1663, he travelled abroad. Upon his return, he became a lieutenant in the Svea Life Guards, and was promoted to captain the following year.

In 1665, he married Countess Christina Catharina Stenbock (1649–1719), the daughter of Admiral Gustaf Otto Stenbock. They had fifteen children; eight girls and seven boys, most of whom died prematurely. His namesake son, Anders Torstensen, a colonel, was killed at the Battle of Poltava. His next-to-last child, Carl Ulrik Torstenson also became a colonel, with the Närke-Värmland Regiment, and died suddenly, while on a trip to visit the spa in Aachen.

He was promoted to colonel in 1667, and received an appointment as "Master of the Horse". In 1673, he became a member of the Riksråd (Council of the Realm, or Privy Council). He had served for only a year when he resigned, to become the first Governor-General of Estland, part of the Swedish province of Livonia. He held that post until 1681.

In 1684, he was appointed President of the Åbo hovrätt, an appellate court in what is now Finland. Due to an illness, he never took up his duties. He died two years later.

Preceded by none	Governor General of Swedish Estonia; 1674–1681	Succeeded by Axel Julius De la Gardie
