= Battles at Göta Älv =

Battle during the Great Northern War

Battles at Göta älv
- Part of the Great Northern War
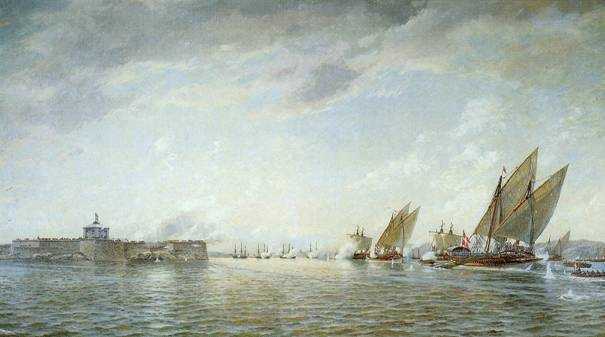
- Danish forces firing upon New Älvsborg fortress whilst leaving Göta älv entrance, May 1717. Painting by Jacob Hägg.
Date	2 May 1717 – 27 September 1719 (O.S); 13 May 1717 – 8 October 1719 (N.S.)
Location	Göta Älv, Gothenburg, Sweden
Result	Swedish victory

Belligerents
Sweden	Denmark–Norway

Commanders and leaders
(Sweden) Carl Gustaf Mörner (1717) (Sweden) Olof Strömstierna (1717) (Sweden) Johan Abraham Lillie (1719) (Sweden) Georg Bogislaus Staël (1719)	(Denmark–Norway) Peter Tordenskjold (Denmark–Norway) Oluf Budde (1719)

Strength
1717 – 550 soldiers, 400 cannons, 6 frigates; 1719 – 360+ soldiers, 80+ cannons, 3 galleys; September 1719 – ~100 soldiers, ~100 cannons	1,800 soldiers, 340 cannons, 30 ships; 6,000 soldiers, 528 cannons, 20 ships; 30 soldiers, ~18 cannons, 11 ships

Casualties and losses
Over 30 dead, 70 injured A few sunken ships	Over 60 dead, 73 injured Several ships sunk or captured by the Swedes

The battles at Göta älv were a series of battles and sieges which took place in and around the Gothenburg area between 1717 and 1719, between the Swedish Empire and Denmark–Norway, during the Great Northern War.

When Charles XII was forced to halt his assault on southern Norway in 1716, Dano-Norwegian troops, under the command of the young commander Peter Tordenskjold, attempted to blockade Gothenburg and assault its newly constructed naval base; Nya Varvet (New Shipyard) in the spring of 1717, but was unsuccessful. Tordenskold also attempted an assault on Strömstad, also without success. The attacks resulted in the Swedes rebasing their Gothenburg Squadron to Marstrand, some smaller vessels were rebased to Strömstad.

Following Charles XII's renewed assault on Norway in the autumn of 1718, as well as the breakdown of the 1719 peace negotiations, Denmark–Norway launched yet another assault targeting Bohuslän. The goal for the Dano-Norwegian forces was to achieve a quick end of the war with a resulting territorial loss for Sweden, but also to halt the Swedes' privateering operations which were taking a toll on Denmark–Norway. Strömstad was quickly conquered by early July 1719, and the strong Carlsten Fortress at Marstrand was conquered by Tordenskjold, partly thanks to psychological warfare. During the battles in and around Marstrand, large parts of the Gothenburg Squadron were sunk by friendly forces in order to prevent its vessels from falling under enemy control. A subsequent Dano-Norwegian assault against the New Älvsborg fortress in the riverhead of Gothenburg's inlet port was countered by the Swedes. Just before hostilities would calm down in the autumn of 1719, Tordenskjold launched yet another assault on Nya Varvet, this time with fewer troops but ultimately resulting in a more successful operation than the one that preceded it.

== Background ==
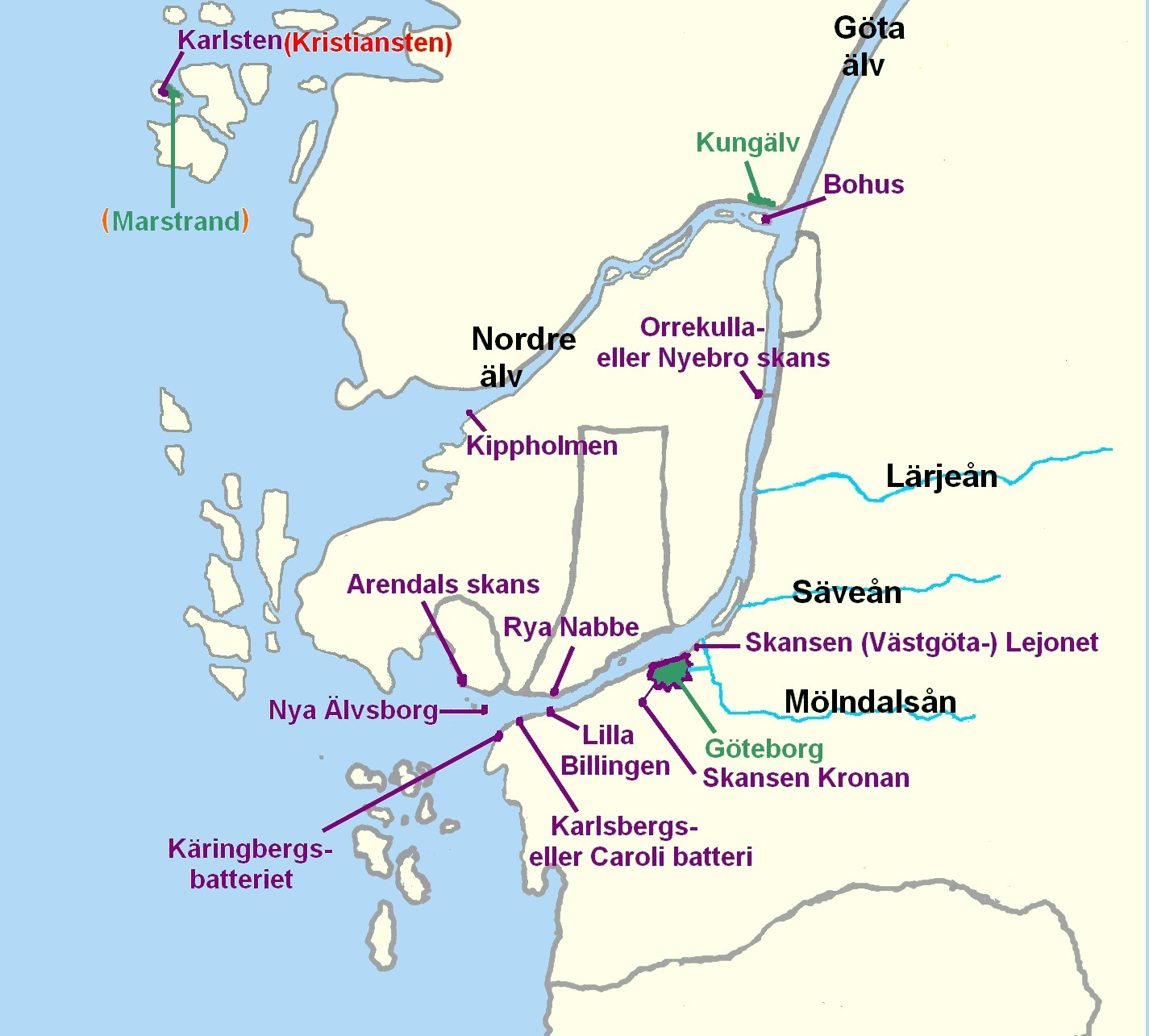
Active fortifiations surrounding Gothenburg due to the Great Northern War 1700–1721.

Following the Swedish defeat in the Battle of Poltava in June 1709, Denmark–Norway declared war on Sweden on 8 August (O.S) that same year. Subsequent Russian attacks resulted in the seizure of Swedish defense structures across all of the Baltic region as well as parts of Finland. The new Russian naval base Kronstadt as well as other newly conquered Baltic ports became bases for Russian vessels. This drastically changed the situation for the Swedish Navy, as they had to focus more on the growing Russian Navy, compared to before, when the Swedes had concentrated their efforts on the Danes in the southern Baltic Sea and Øresund. The vital objective was to prevent the Danes and Russians from coordinating and combining their naval power. This situation was a major strain on Swedish resources and it made the defense of their western waters from the Dano-Norwegian fleet especially difficult. The Gothenburg area was considered a relatively low priority, despite the fact that the city's trade significance was growing.

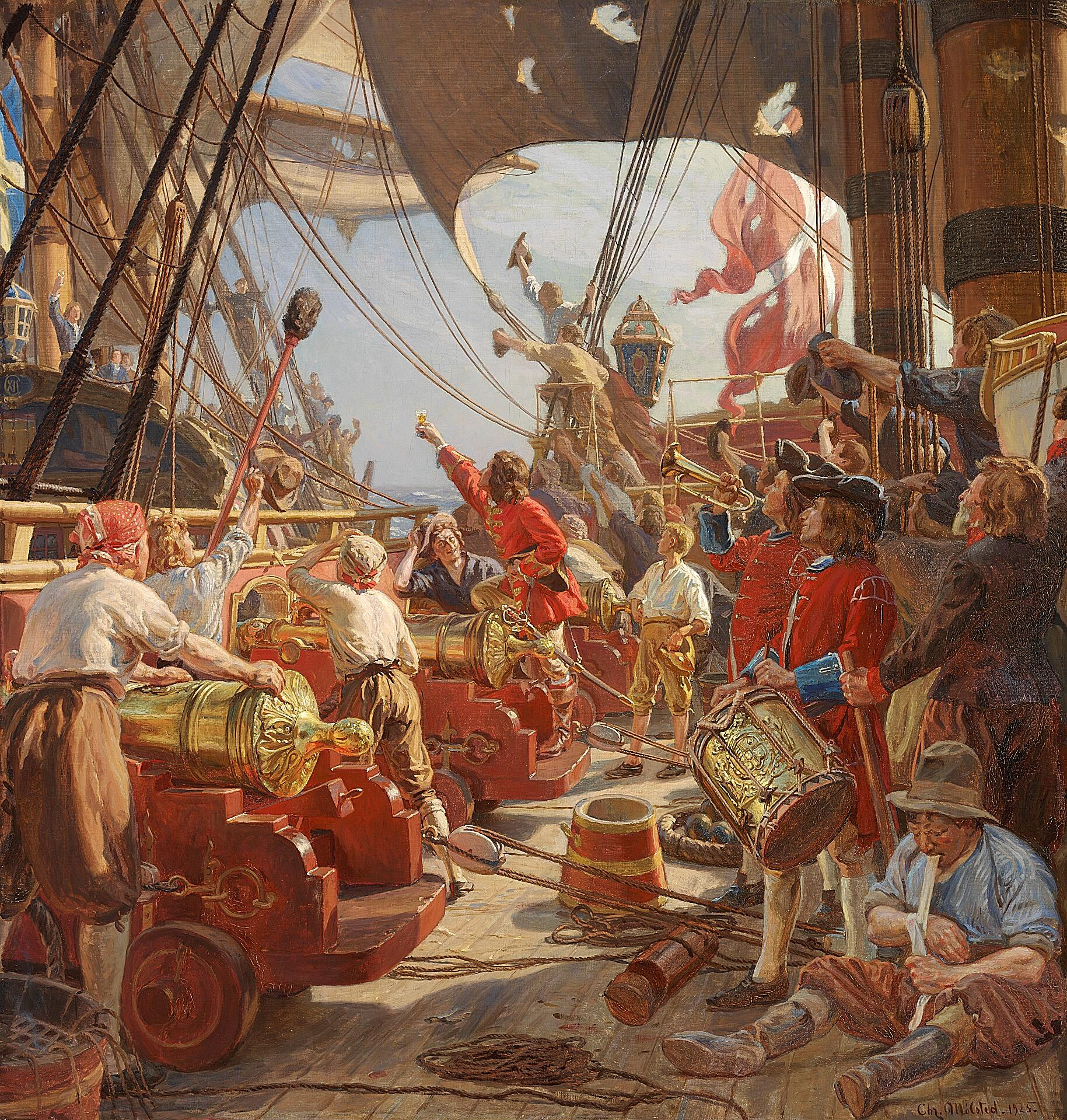
Representation of the meeting between the Danish frigate Løvendals Galei under the command of Tordenskjold, and the Swedish privateer Olbing Galley on the Swedish west coast. During the lengthy battle, the Danish ran out of gunpowder for their cannons, and following the sharing of a few drinks between both commanders, the vessels went their separate ways. Painted by the Danish artist Christian Mølsted.

The construction of a new, deeper naval base, Nya Varvet (New Shipyard), had begun in 1700 at the river entrance of Lilla Billingen, which was supposed to replace the existing Gamla Varvet (Old Shipyard), at what is today Stigberget. In addition to Gothenburg city fortress, the coastal fortress New Älvsborg in the river entrance of Göta älv, as well as Carlsten in Marstrand had all been expanded during the last decades.

In 1704 it was decided that forced naval conscription was to be performed in the former Danish provinces (Scania, Bohuslän and Halland, among others) which were now part of southern Sweden. This meant that the part of the population that were fit for naval service were obliged to serve the navy during times of war, in exchange for some benefits. The local enthusiasm, however, was low, and many seamen fit for service instead sought service in the Danish and Norwegian navies. By spring 1715, 72 of the 140 naval officers that were conscripted in Gothenburg were ordered to Stockholm and the navy in the Baltic Sea.

In order to compensate for the Swedish navy's diminished resources, letters of marque were issued, which authorized crews of armed, privately owned Swedish vessels to seize vessels belonging to nations that Sweden were at war with, and to an extent, sell their cargo. The crown received a 10 percent cut on these sales. Starting in 1710, privateering companies were being set up as a result. In 1711, the Crown allowed loyal privateers to borrow weapons and munitions from the government's Gothenburg storages. Admirals complained that privateers were using conscripted sailors during their operations that were supposed to be serving in the Navy.

Swedish privateering operations expanded further in 1715 when foreign navy captains were authorized to receive letters of marque and to operate under Swedish flag. It was also no longer mandatory to pay a cut of the cargo value to the Swedish crown. By 1715, a total of 25 Swedish privateers were conducting active operations in the Western Sea, which disrupted Dano-Norwegian trading routes severely. The largest privateering operation was led by Lars Gathe of Onsala. He was named Gathenhielm and Commander by Charles XII so he could not only command his privateering operation, but also the entire Swedish privateering fleet on the west coast.

=== Charles XII's Norwegian Campaign of 1716 ===
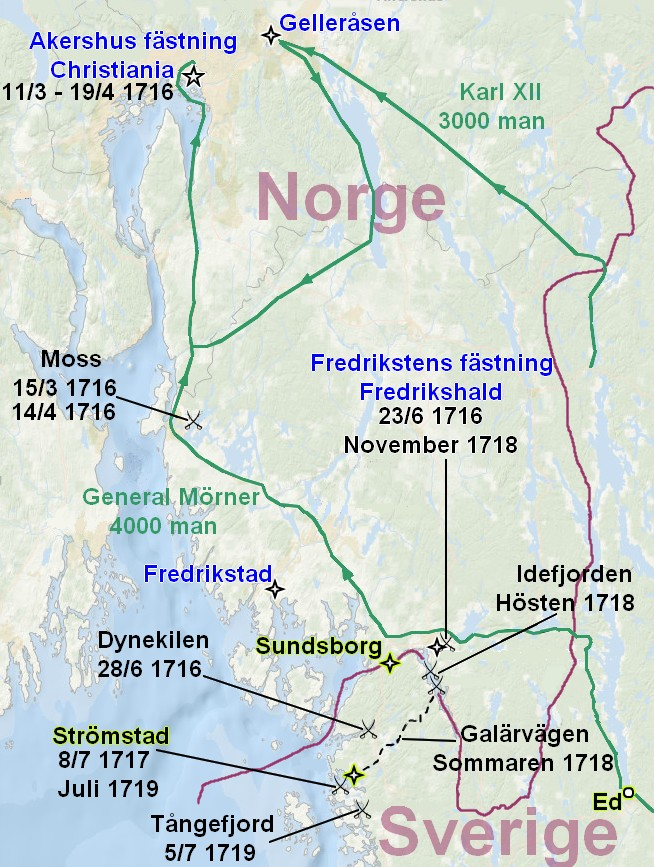
Map of northern Bohuslän and southern Norway, with battles in connection to Charles XII:s assault on Christiania 1716 (green line), and Fredriksten 1718. Locations displaying Dano-Norwegian counterattacks 1716, 1717 and 1719 also shown.

In February, a smaller Swedish force composed of men from Värmland, Dalsland and Svinesund, marched into Norway with the intention of conquering Akershus fortress in Christiania, thereby forcing Denmark to make peace. After passing by the fortress town of Fredrikstad as well as Fredriksten fortress, near present-day Halden, Charles XII was able to march in to the undefended Christiania by 11 March, whilst under persistent fire from Akershus fortress. After a failed storming attempt, Charles XII realized that he needed access to more powerful siege artillery. Repeated attempts to defeat the Norwegian forces around Swedish-occupied Christiania failed because of General von Lützow's skilled defensive tactics and by him avoiding as many battles as possible, since he was aware that his relatively untrained army couldn't compare to the seasoned Swedish Caroleans. Additionally, the coming thaw meant that Danish reinforcements could start arriving by ship. The rough Norwegian terrain, combined with the lack of supplies and the active resistance of the local civilians forced the Swedish Army to retreat south.

A major cause to the Swedish defeat during the campaign was the inability to compete with the Danes on the sea. The commander of the Gothenburg Squadron, Vice admiral Axel Lewenhaupt, had only managed to put one frigate, the Älvsborg (46 cannons) to sea, by letting privateers borrow it for 20 000 daler. This, of course, did not prevent Danish vessels from supplying the Norwegians with soldiers and supplies. The Danish General Staff credited the retaking of Christiania to their fleet. In Gothenburg, Vice-Admiral Lewenhaupt had under rough circumstances managed to put together a transport fleet consisting of 24 vessels loaded with siege cannons, ammunition and other supplies. The fleet was escorted by six galleys and an armed barge. It moved slowly north along the coast under the command of schoutbynacht Olof Knape. By the end of April, it entered Dynekilen, a fjord between Strömstad and Svinesund. Additional transport ships arrived during the following months.

=== Battle of Dynekilen ===
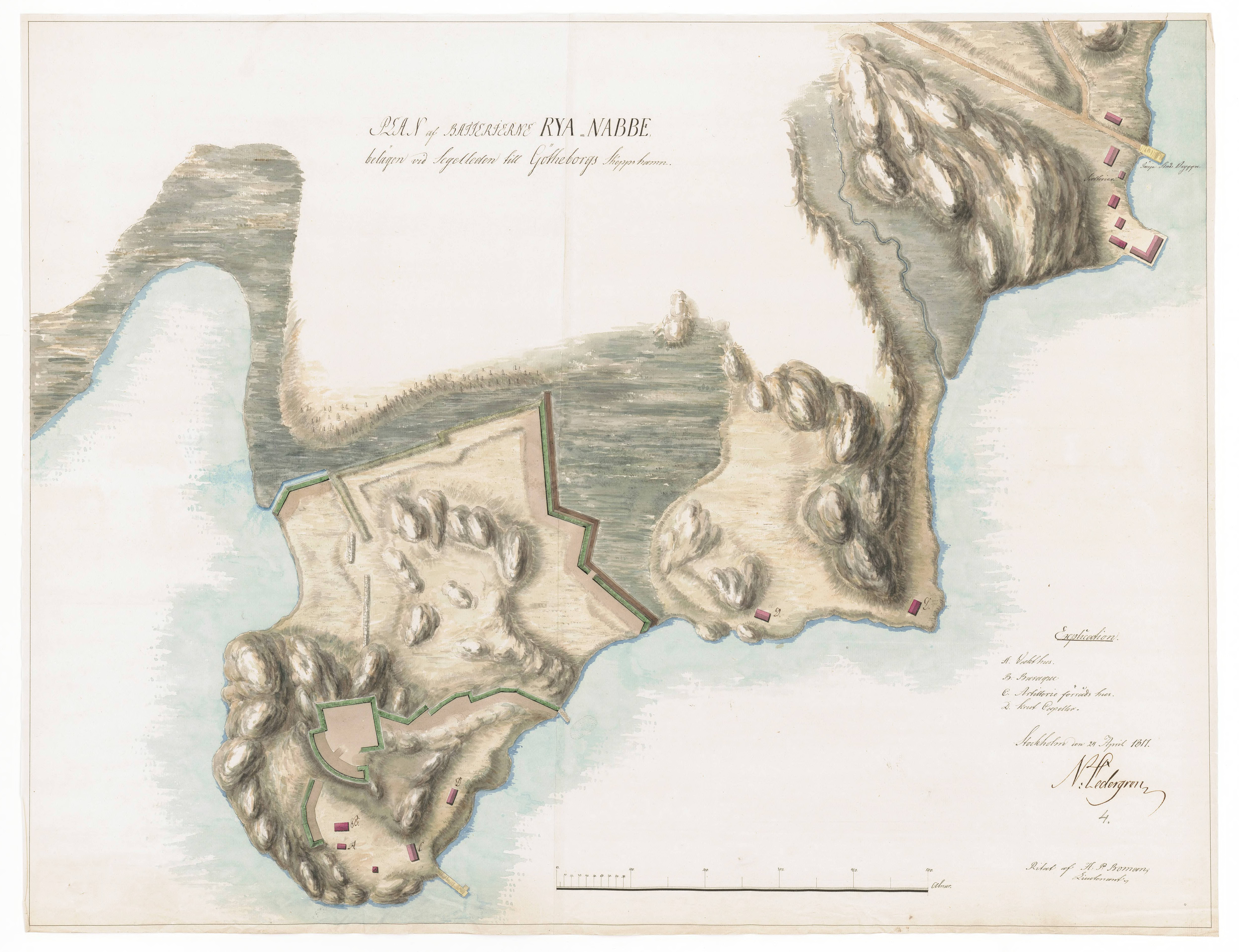
Hand drawn map from 1811 of the batteries on Rya Nabbe.

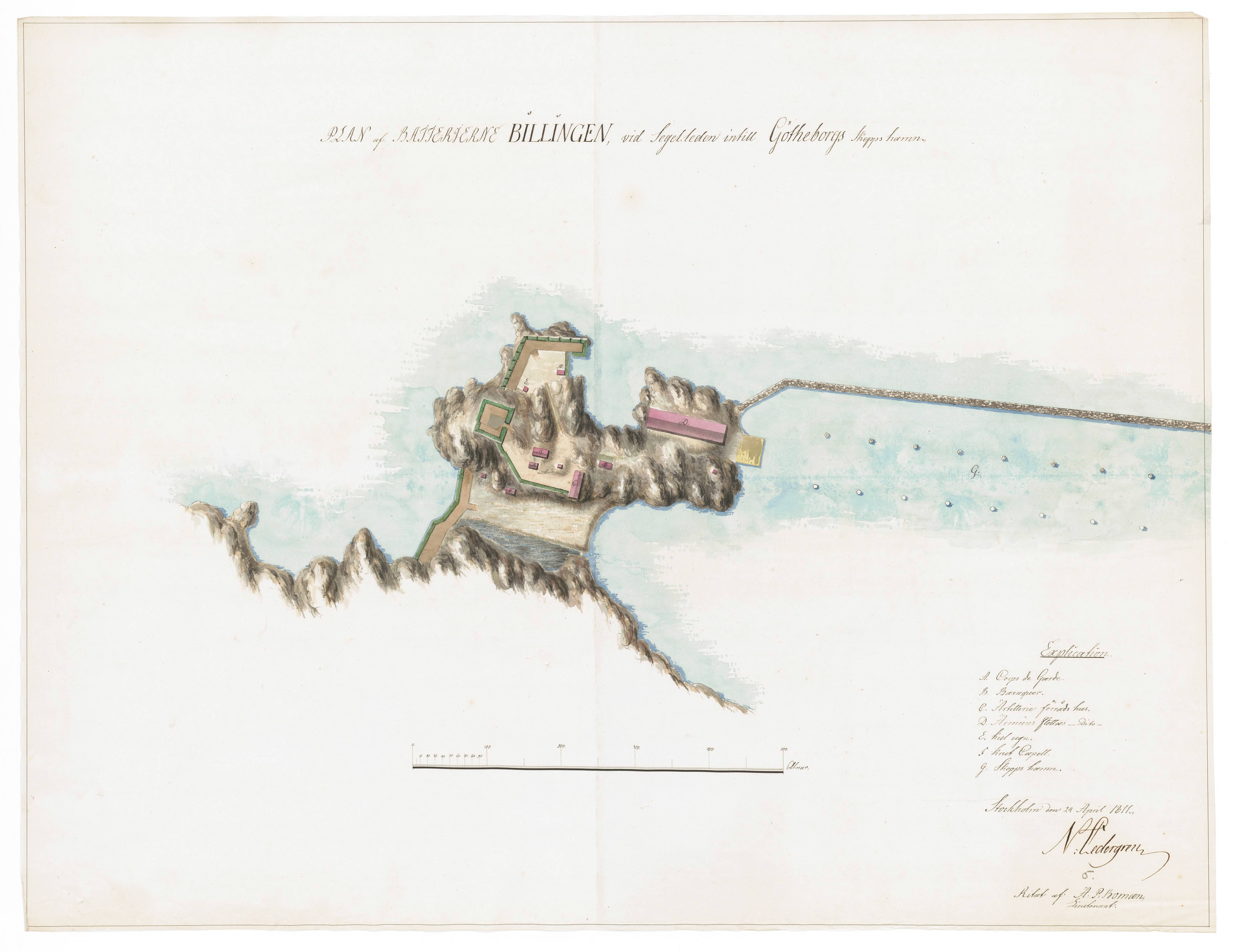
Hand drawn map from 1811 of the batteries at Lilla Billingen.

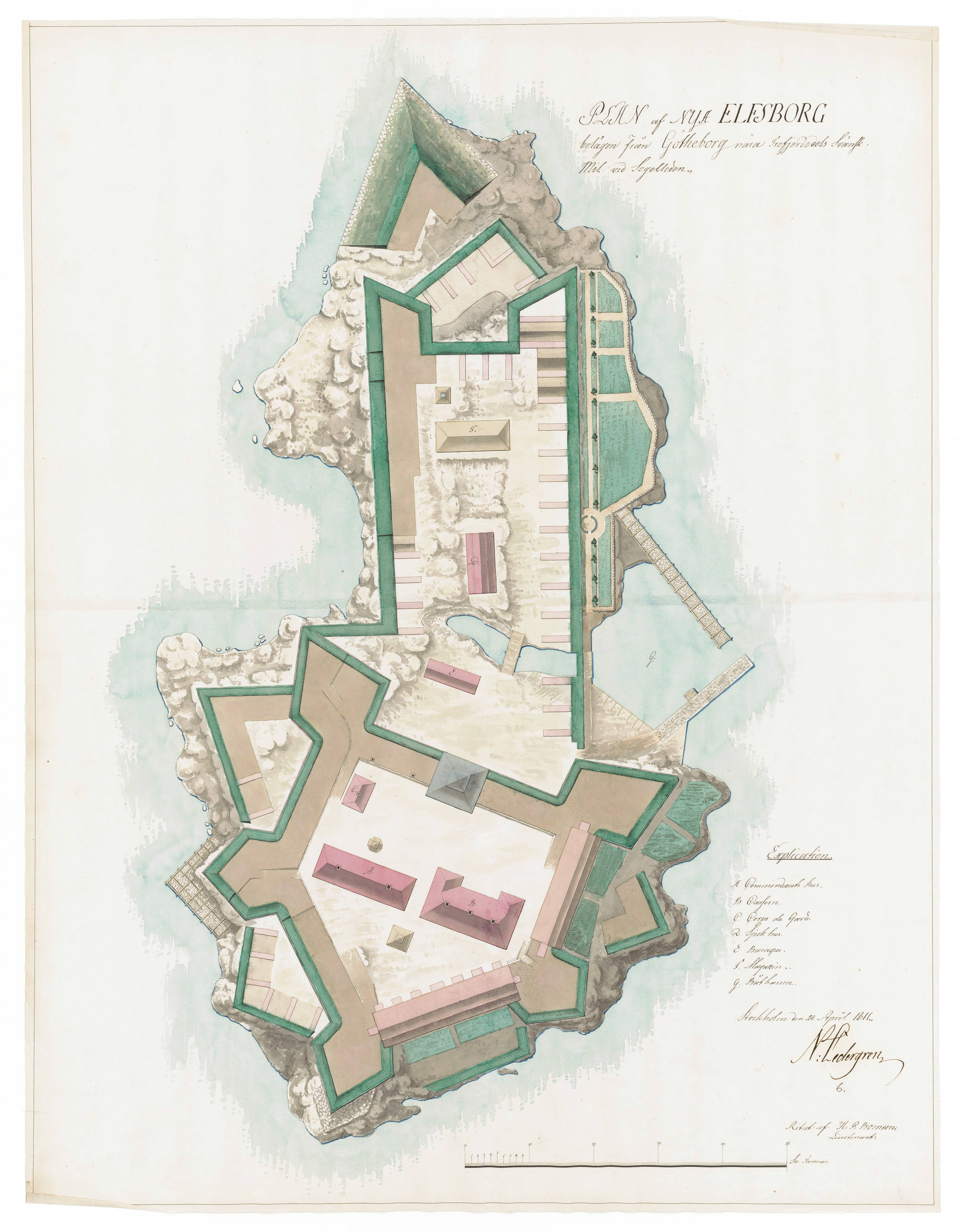
Drawing from 1811 showing the fortress New Älvsborg.

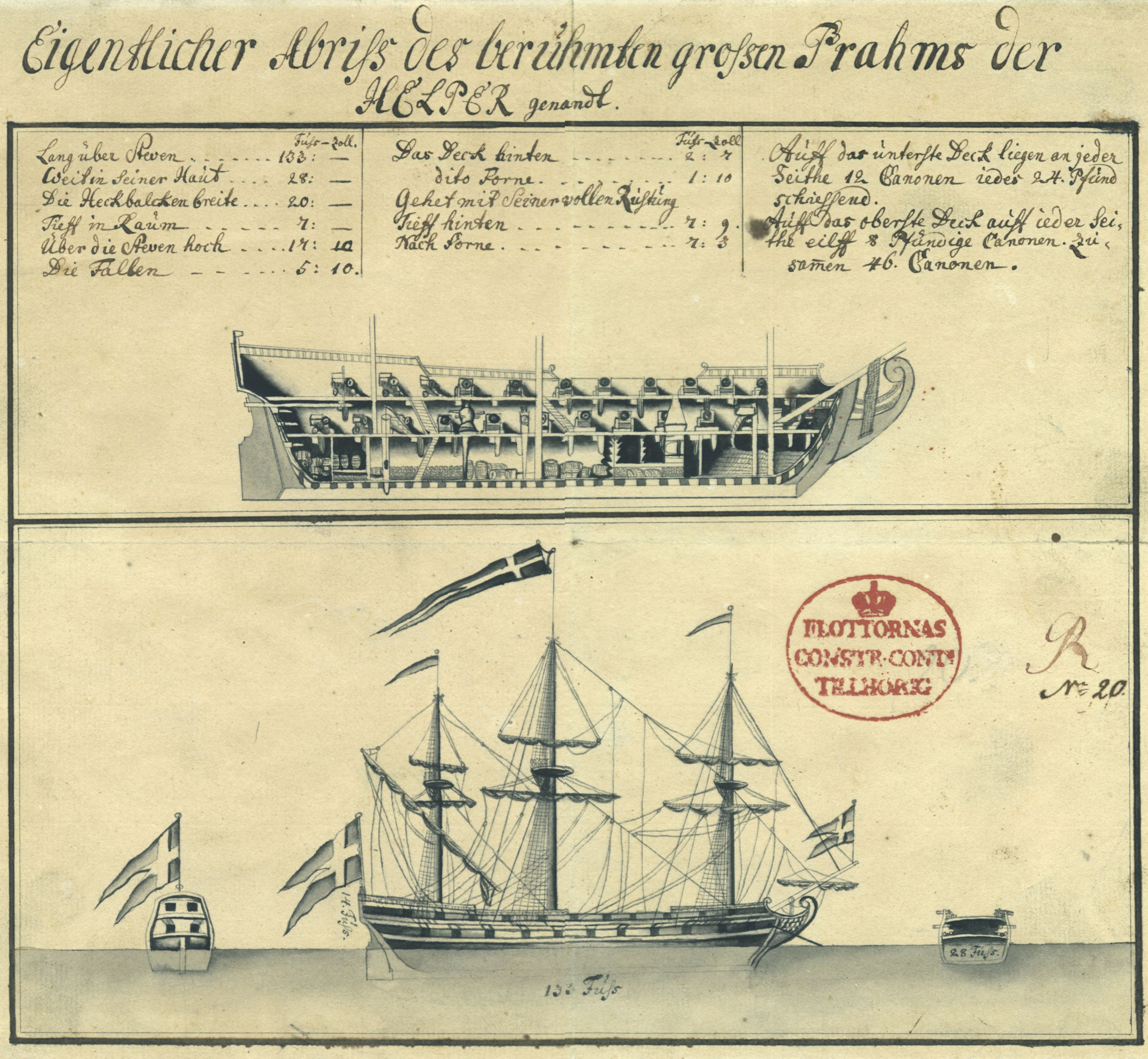
The Danish barge Hjælperen (46 cannons). The vessel took part in the Battle of Dynekilen in 1716, as well as in the assaults on Nya Varvet and Strömstad in 1717.

During the night of 28 June, Norwegian Commander Peder Tordenskjold initiated one of the most daring and most widely renowned naval battles in Nordic history. By sailing directly into the approximately 5 kilometer long and narrow fjord with frigates, galleys and armed barges, the Swedes were taken by surprise. The Dano-Norwegian superior number of cannons meant that the entire Swedish transport fleet was either sunk or captured after five hours of combat.

Without any usable siege artillery, and with a high risk of being cut off, Charles XII ordered a full retreat of the Swedish Army on 29 June. His soldiers managed to cross over to the Swedish side of the Idefjord, before Tordenskjold could destroy the bridge at Svinesund. The 25-year old Tordenskjold was promoted to captain, and in November he was designated Chief of the Norwegian Navy. The Swedish captain Strömstierna managed to reach land from the galley Wrede, and despite his defeat, he was promoted to vice admiral by Charles XII.

By early 1717 the Danes were still worrying that Charles XII would resume his invasion of Norway. Swedish privateers based in Gothenburg were still persistent in their harassing of Dano-Norwegian trade. Tordenskjold therefore prepared an assault on the Gothenburg Squadron and as much as possible on the Gothenburg-based privateering squadron at Göta älv. The moment of surprise would gain significance, as it did at Dynekilen. There were however no plans on attacking the New Älvsborg fortress or the Gothenburg city fortress. By February, Danish vessels had started blockading the river mouth of Göta älv.

== 1717 Attack on Nya Varvet ==
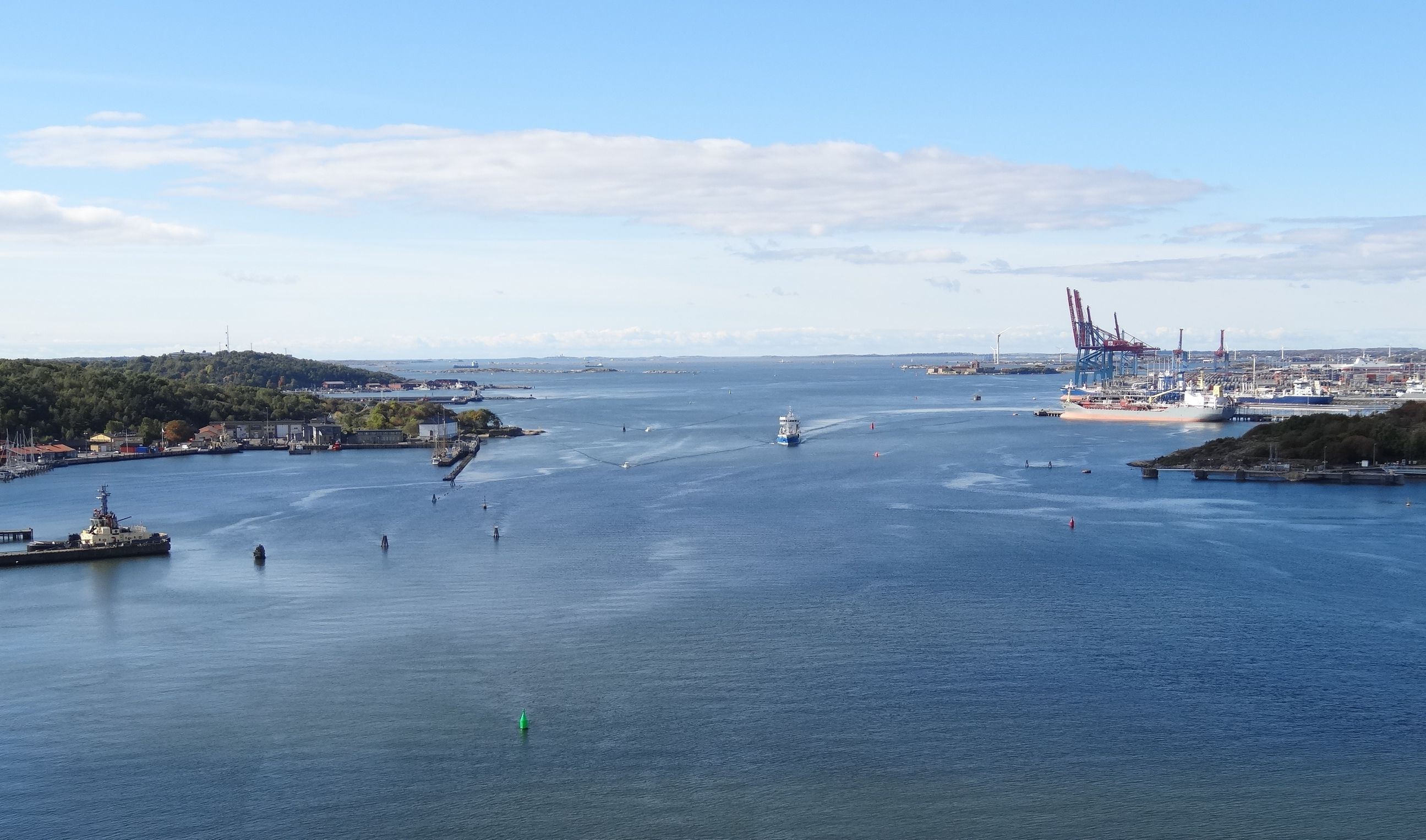
The battlefield as seen from the Älvsborg Bridge. Nya Varvet is to the left and in the distance, Käringberget. Rya Nabbe is to the right, along with New Älvsborg fortress, past the container cranes of Skandia Port.

In the morning of 2 May 1717, a Dano-Norwegian naval force anchored in the Gothenburg archipelago with the purpose of conducting a night raid against Swedish harbors and dockyards in the city, but their moment of surprise was lost from the beginning. This happened because of disagreements between the Dano-Norwegian commanders which ultimately resulted in one of the necessary barges; the Arca Noæ not arriving on time. The Danes under the command of Tordenskjold, still managed to maneuver past New Älvsborg fortress with barges, galleys and slopes containing around 100 cannons and 1800 soldiers, during the night between 2 and 3 May.

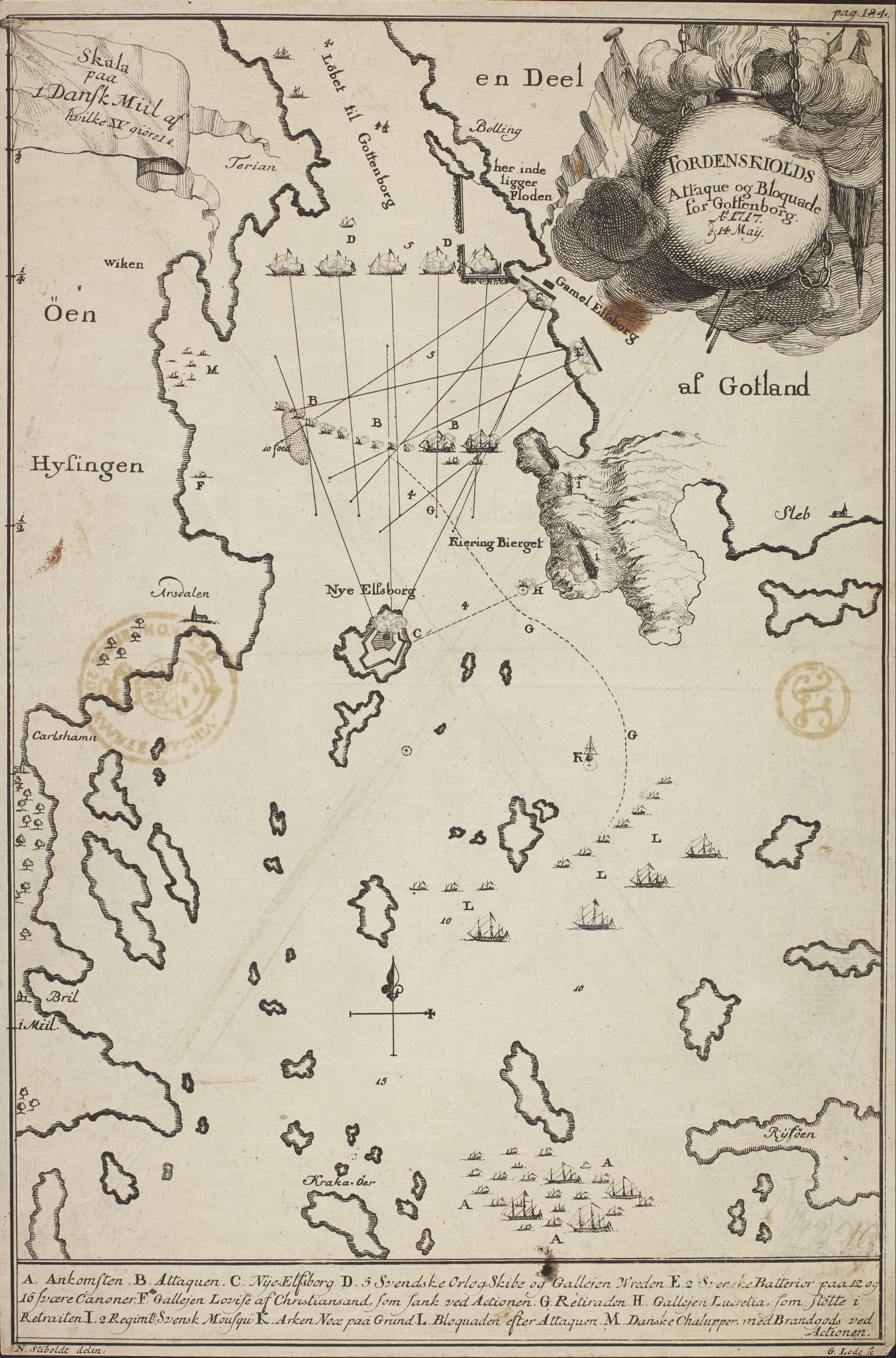
Tordenskiolds Attaque og Bloquade for Gottenborg 1717. Samtida danskt kopparstick, vy från väster. Några felaktigheter är att berget Billingen (Bolling) och Gamla Älvsborg har bytt plats. Dessutom sjönk inte galären Louise (F), utan togs som god pris av svenskarna.

As a result of the Danish disorder before the battle, the Swedes could spare a few additional hours to see over their defenses. The defense of Gothenburg was formally led by Carl Gustaf Mörner, the governor of Gothenburg and Bohus County, but was in practice being led by Olof Strömstierna. Frederick I, a future successor to the Swedish throne, was because of co-incidence in Gothenburg at the time and took part in the fighting.

Two of the Gothenburg Squadron's frigates, the Fredericus and the Halmstad had been leased to the Gathenhielm privateers. The Halmstad was equipped, but undermanned. These two frigates as well as an additional two from Nya Varvet, formed a blockade in Göta älv between Nya Varvet and Rya Nabbe. Strömstierna supplied the vessels with barricades so as to prevent the Danes from boarding them. Additionally, New Älvsborg fortress had been reinforced with a crew of 400 soldiers and 90 cannons. The two cannon batteries Lilla Billingen and Rya Nabbe, with 12 heavy cannons each had been manned with infantry from the Saxon Infantry Regiment led by Colonel G.D Zengerlein. In addition, the Småland Regiment as well as an elite unit, the Grenadier Battalion led by Johan Clausen, which composed of handpicked grenadiers from different units, were assigned to man the forts. In total, there were around 1000 Swedish soldiers and 200 cannons at the rivermouth of Göta älv.

At roughly 8 in the morning, the Danes were forced to retreat, due to them not being able to breach the Swedish defenses. The Danish force sailed with an east-bearing wind out of Göta älv, with a slightly reduced fleet. Two galleys were left behind by the Danes and captured by the Swedes. The raid resulted in 52 casualties and 79 badly injured for the Danes. 40 were mildly injured and could keep working. Tordenskjold's superiors questioned his judgement due to his order to go ahead with the raid despite the circumstances. In the evening of 15 May, the blockade of Gothenburg was lifted and Tordenskjold's squadron started its sail towards Norway.

== War in Northern Bohuslän ==
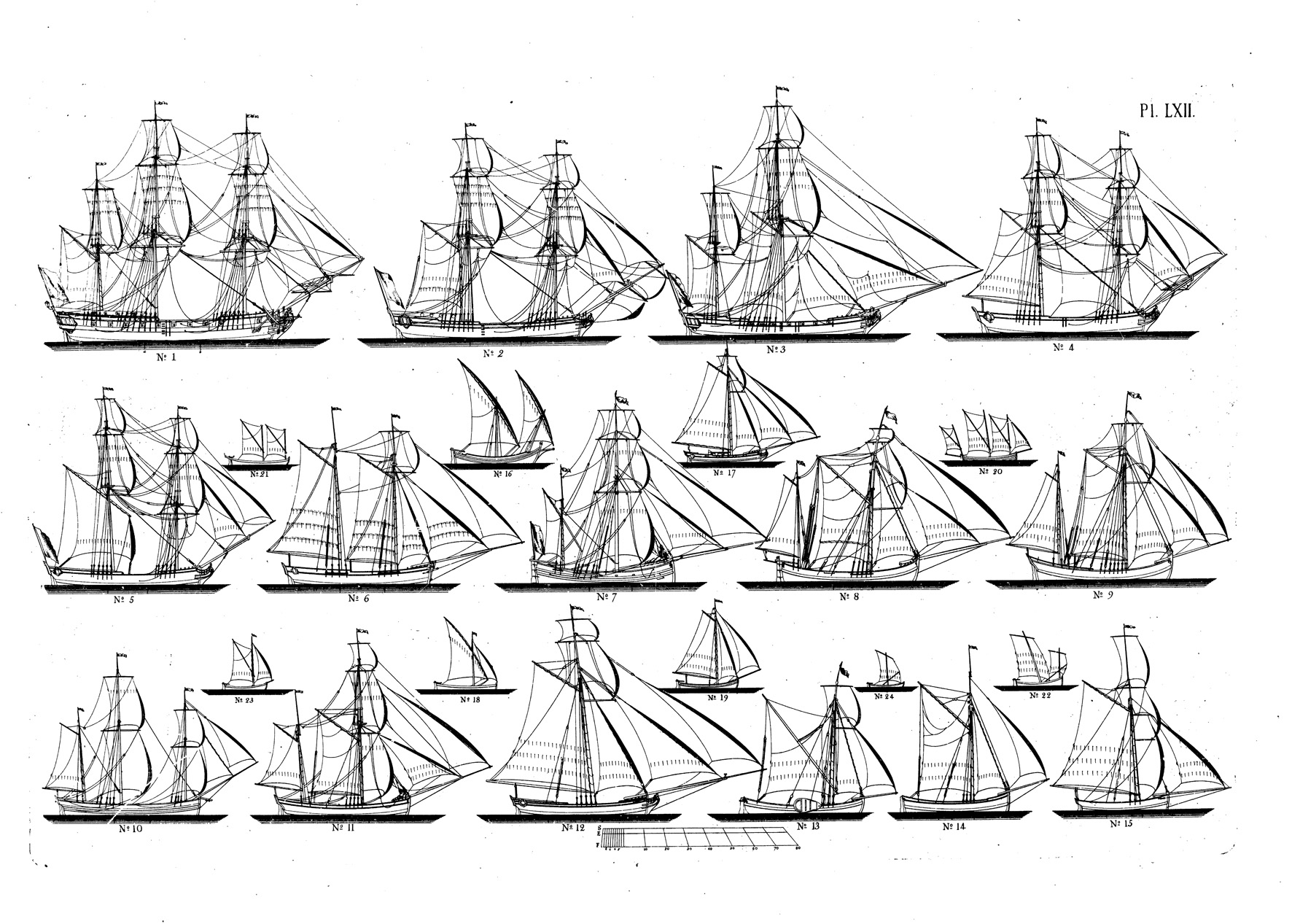
Ships used by both sides in the conflict. From Fredrik Henrik af Chapman's Architectura Navalis Mercatoria.

Following their victory against Tordenskjold in May 1717, the Swedish military deemed that Strömstad was in a vulnerable position and that it required reinforcement. Captain Nils Gyllenschruf succeeded in transporting soldiers, cannons, ammunition and grain from Gothenburg to Strömstad by 14 June. The troops were part of the Halland Regiment and the previously mentioned Grenadier Battalion. The Västerbotten Regiment was also ordered to Strömstad. A major fortification project ensued, and by 29 June, Major General Johan Giertta, who was responsible for the defense of the border with Norway, could report that two cannon batteries were operational and the remaining two were near completion.

On July 8, Tordenskjold assaulted Strömstad with a squadron, and following heavy firing upon the city, an attempt was made to land soldiers escorted by galleys. The assault failed when the Swedish counterattack couldn't be stopped despite firing against them by Danish ships of the line and barges. A number of attacking galleys got stuck on rocks and were stranded. At 15 to 20 meters distance, Swedish grenadiers were able to hit with devastating musket salvos. The Danish casualties numbered 96 in addition to their 246 injured. Among the injured was Tordenskjold himself who was carried back to the ship of the line Laaland, bleeding and barely conscious. He was promptly replaced by the more careful Schoutbynacht Andreas Rosenpalm.

Charles XII visited Strömstad and Gothenburg in September 1717. He decided that the Gothenburg Squadron was to be moved, and that its larger vessels, the frigates, were to be placed in the more strongly fortified Marstrand. The lesser vessels were to be based in Strömstad. Missing dockyards and storage facilities were to be constructed as soon as possible, by order of the King.

One of the lessons learned from the Swedish invasion in 1716 was to not have large Swedish storage caches in occupied Norwegian territory. Almost 40 cargo ships therefore completed 150 transports of supplies from Gothenburg and Uddevalla to storages in Strömstad, between April and October 1718. The convoys were escorted by screens of the Gothenburg Squadron, since its frigates were lacking in equipment and manpower. Three of the frigates, the Varberg, Halmstad and the Fredricus had been put under the command of Gathenhielm.

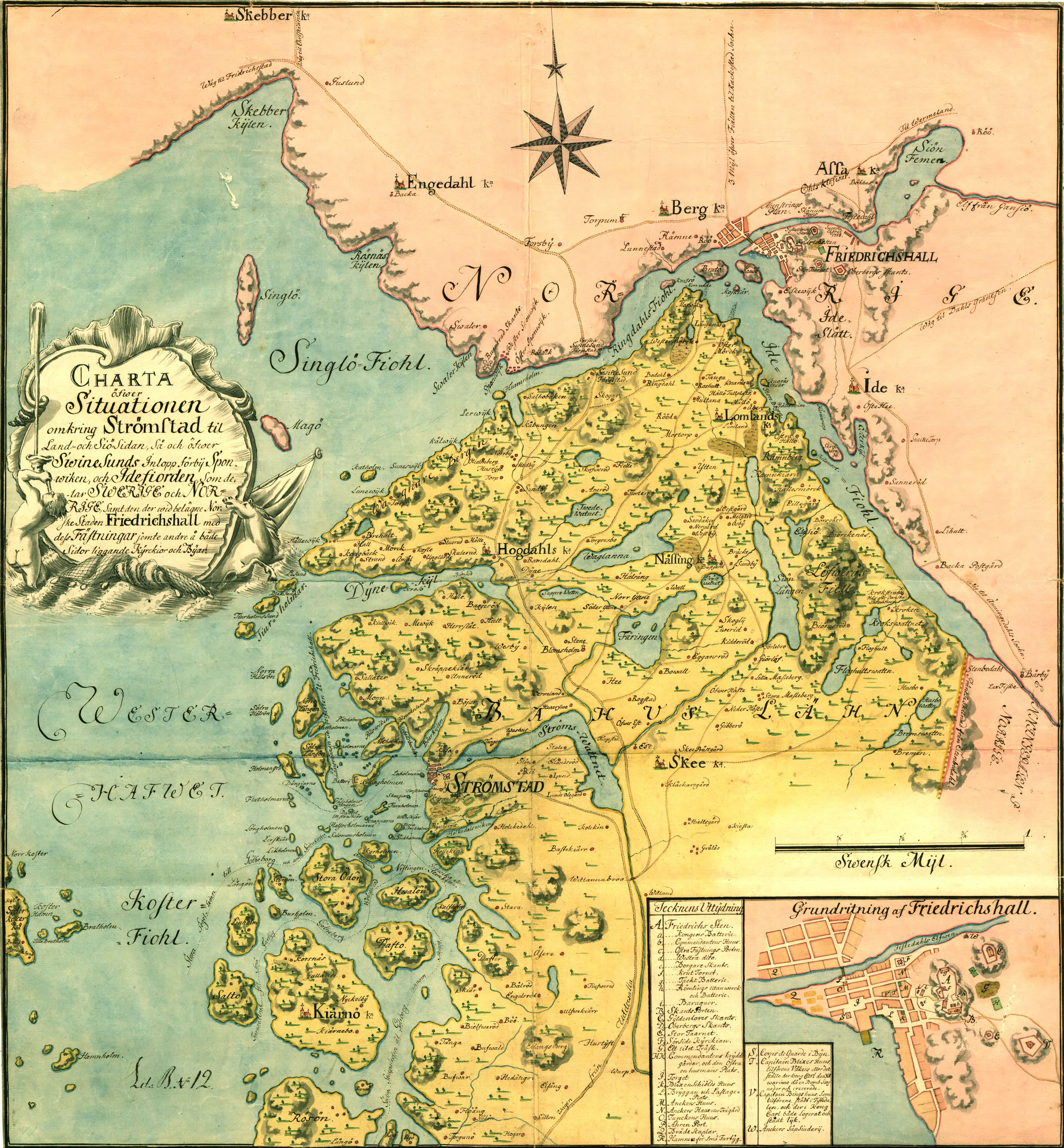
1749 map of northern Bohuslän and its border with Norway, detailing the defenses around the Norwegian town of Halden (Friedrichshall).

In the Ide fjord, a smaller Norwegian squadron had the ability to either assault the Swedish storage caches in Strömstad, or threaten the Swedish troops which were yet again planning to cross the border. Due to the fact that the entrance to Svinesund was blockaded by naval vessels and Norwegian cannon batteries, Charles XII decided that a number of galleys should be towed across land from Strömstad to Trångsviken in the Ide fjord, a distance of roughly 20 kilometers. The transport proved to be a difficult task across rough terrain, trickles and narrow roads. The transport of the heaviest vessel, the brigantine Luren, took two months. The roughly 40 tonne ship got stuck in a trickle and remained immobile until technical experts Christopher Polhem and Emanuel Swedenborg were called upon to remove the vessel. On 10 September, under the command of Charles XII, the Swedish vessels, including brigantines and sloops, forced the Norwegian squadron to retreat to Fredrikshald during a battle in the Ide fjord.

Following the renewed campaign against Norway in the autumn of 1718, and the subsequent death of Charles XII at Fredriksten fortress on 30 November, the Swedish Army marched back across the border into Sweden. The march would result in large casualties due to a severe winter storm, an event known as the Carolean Death March. Additionally, the Swedish east coast was being threatened by Russia. This was an opportunity for Denmark–Norway to retake areas on the Swedish west coast. Intricate plans regarding a land and naval invasion on Bohuslän existed already, and were put into motion. The large supply caches that had been constructed in Strömstad in 1718 were now facing a major threat by the Dano-Norwegian counter-attack, and during late 1718 and early 1719, Swedish cannons and supplies were heading back south by ship to Gothenburg and Uddevalla. The relocating of supplies meant that northern Bohuslän would be harder to defend.

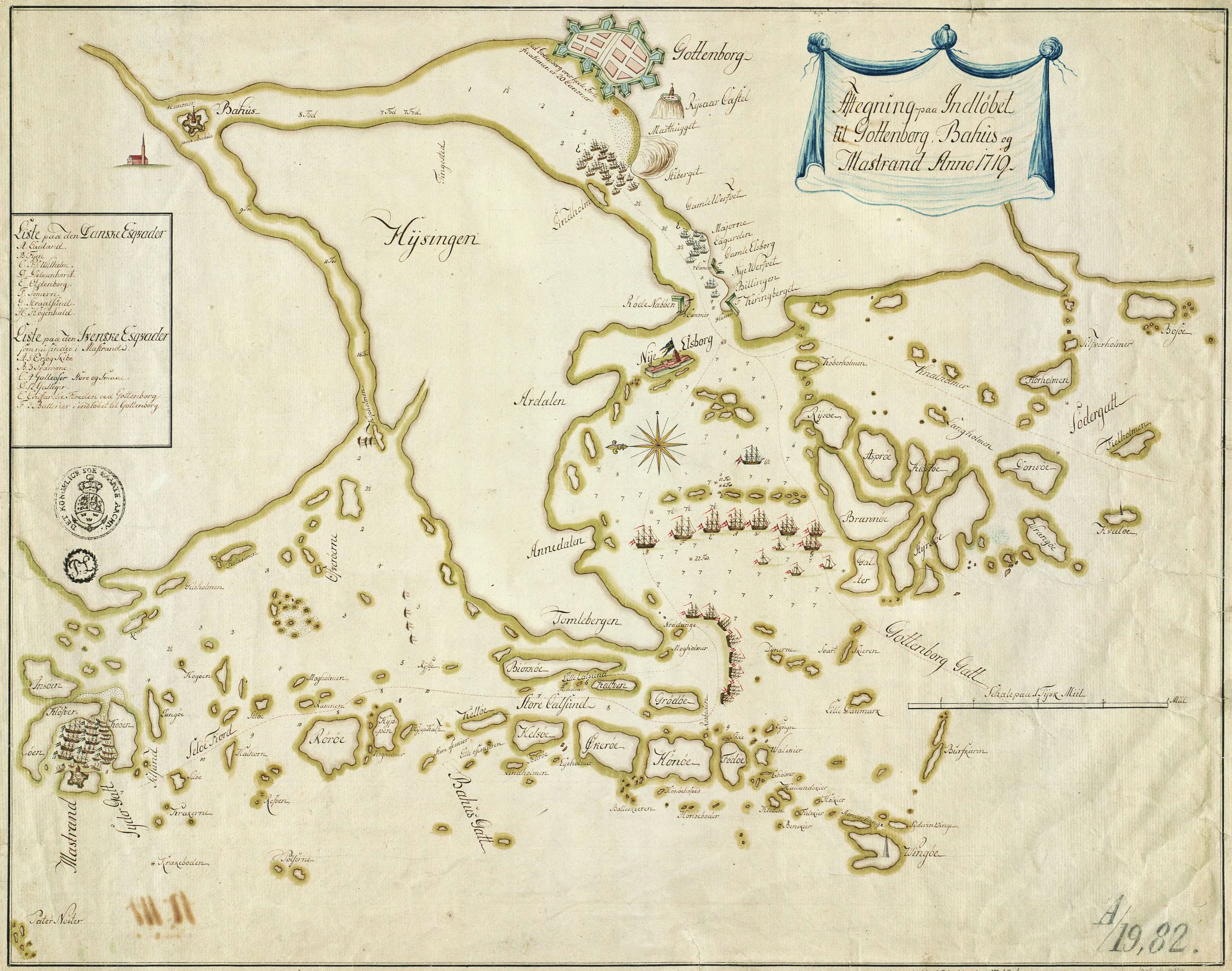
Danish situation map detailing the area between Gothenburg and Marstrand during the spring of 1719. Kalvsund and Rivö fjord are blockaded by Danish ships. Trade vessels at Klippan and Stigberget are not allowed to leave. The Swedish Gothenburg Squadron's frigates are lacking in supplies and based in Marstrand. A few smaller Swedish vessels are guarding at Kippholmen in the river entrance of Nordre älv. Depth is measured in fathom or Danish foot (fod).

On 27 March 1719, a Dano-Norwegian naval force, consisting of four ships of the line and a frigate, anchored in Rivö bay outside of Gothenburg. The blockading force was under the command of Tordenskjold, who had recently been promoted to the lower admiral rank of schout-bij-nacht. To avoid endangering the peace conference that was taking place in Stockholm in the spring, Tordenskjold had been ordered not to assault Gothenburg. In early June, the blockading naval force had increased to seven ships of the line, two frigates, four barges, two floating batteries, one bombarderskip, five galleys and two galiots. The smaller Danish vessels attempted to halt Swedish naval traffic between Nordre river and Marstrand. In mid-June, an additional 26 Danish merchant ships arrived from Öresund with storage for the Danish blockading fleet.

At the end of May, a convoy of transport vessels docked at Marstrand, where transshipment occurred to more capable vessels, where the cargo rerouted for further transport through Nordre river to Gothenburg. A part of the convoy later returned to Strömstad. On 23 May, Field Marshal Carl Gustaf Rehnskiöld was appointed commander of the Swedish troops in Bohuslän, and in early June, an inspection was started in the region. Fortifications were in need of repairs in several locations.

Due to the strong Danish blockading force outside of Gothenburg, with an estimated manpower of 1300 soldiers on board and with several special purpose vessels able to bombard coastal defense positions, it was predicted that the Danes were planning an attack on either Marstrand or Älvsborg fortress. Captain Erik Sjöblad of the Gothenburg Squadron was ordered to moor all frigates and galleys to be able to defend the harbor inlets. Rehnskiöld later gave the order to clear all stationary ships for sinking.

== 1719 Assault on Bohuslän ==
=== Assault on New Älvsborg ===
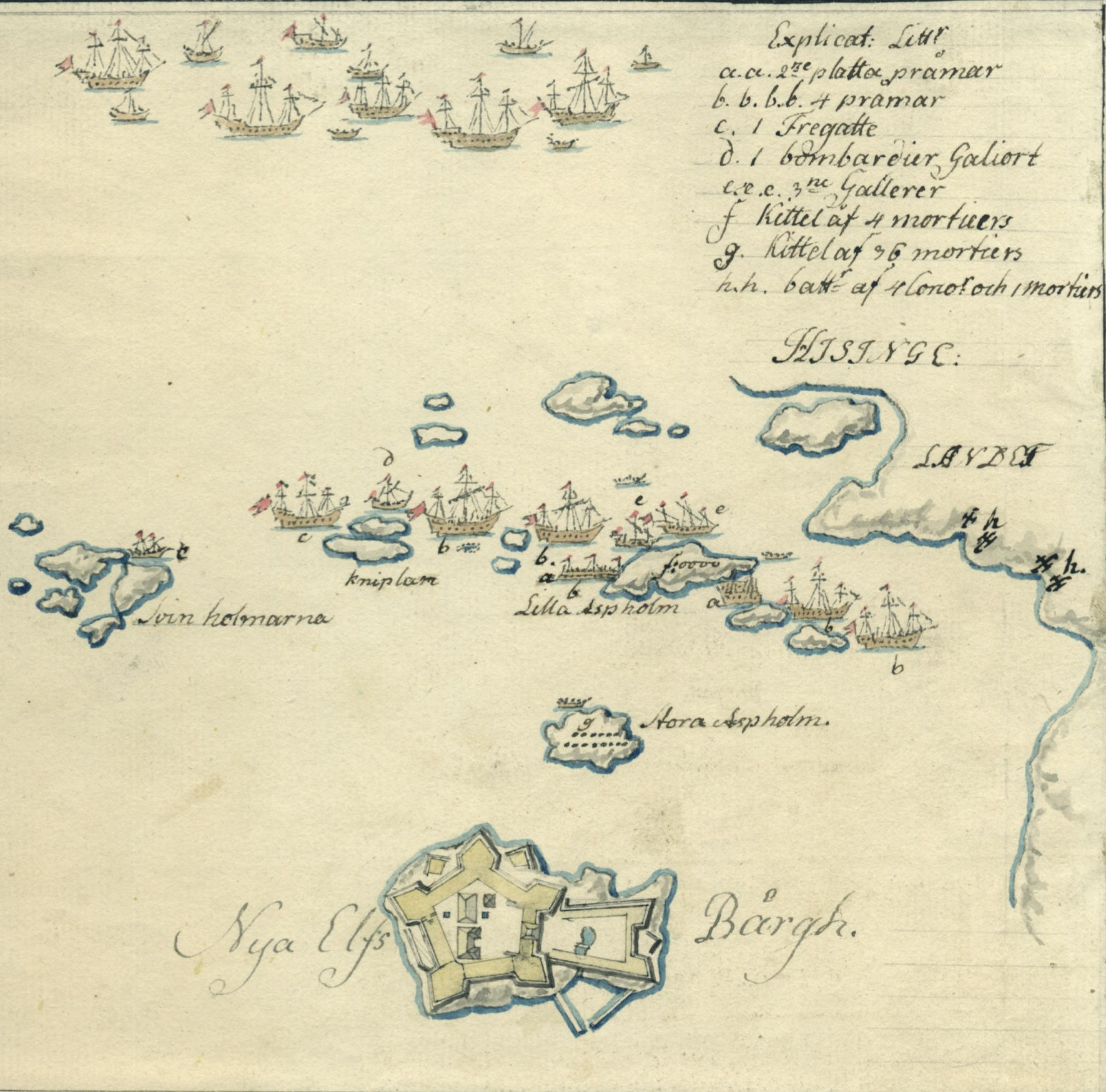
Map of Tordenskjold's assault on New Älvsborg, July 1719.

On 19 and 20 July, Tordenskjold gathered his ships in Rivö fjord, consisting of seven ships of the line, two frigates, four barges, three floating batteries and four galleys, comprising roughly 500 cannons and around 6,000 men. On 21 July, an assault begun on New Älvsborg using barges and floating batteries. The Danes spread out and used the surrounding islands for cover as they closed in on the fortress. Mortars were set up at nearby Aspholmarna.

The Swedes had at this time a crew of around 360 men. These men had been drawn from two companies from the Älvsborg Regiment, a company from the Saxon Infantry Regiment, as well as from the fortress' regular artillery detachment. They were all under the command of Johan Abraham Lillie. The Swedish artillery amounted to around 90 pieces, they all varied in caliber. Mortars and howitzers were also used.

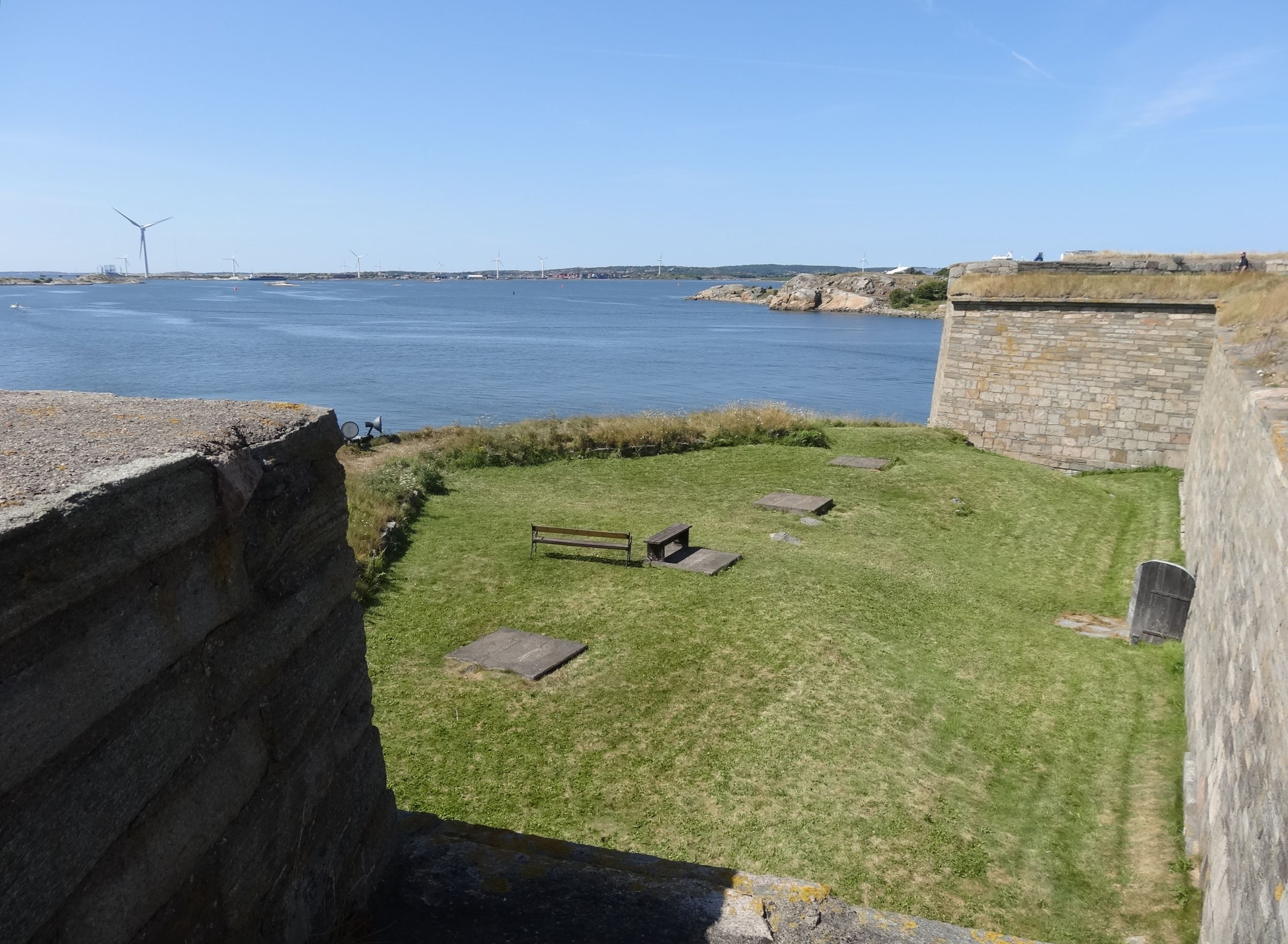
View of the northwest from Havsfrun bastion. Past Rosenlund ravelin, Valfisken bastion can be seen as well as a part of Stora Aspholmen.

The fortress suffered continuous fire for three days without pause. Damages were significant, a castle wall was destroyed due to an explosion of a munitions cache. The three floor high tower was also severely damaged. Lillie refused to surrender despite the damages, responding to the Danish calls for surrender with that he "would rather be brought back to Gothenburg as a dead Lillie than as a living Danckwardt", referring to the late Henrich Danckwardt who was executed by a Swedish court-martial for surrendering Marstrand to the enemy in 1719. Georg Bogislaus Staël von Holstein and his soldiers from the Skaraborg Regiment had a good visual over the Danish batteries in Aspholmarna, but could not reach them with his musketeers. Colonel Staël von Holstein managed to acquire a few cannons from the Gothenburg artillery storage. And so, on the night to 24 July, the cannons were set up in Hisingen and in the morning, they started firing against the undefended Danish mortars in Aspholmarna. The Danish forces aborted their assault on New Älvsborg when three Swedish galleys from Nya Varvet, the Carolus, Wrede and the Lucretia attacked the remaining mortar battery in Aspholmarna, resulting in the Swedish capture of four heavy mortars, 60 bombs and three barrels of gunpowder. Swedish casualties during the siege amounted to 30 dead and 70 wounded, among the latter was Captain Lillie. 60 Danes died and 73 were wounded.

The defense of New Älvsborg fortress attracted attention from all across Sweden, and Captain Lillie was named friherre. The Danish blockade of the river entrance to the city continued, however, and the alert level of the other Swedish fortresses remained high.

=== 1719 Assault on Nya Varvet ===
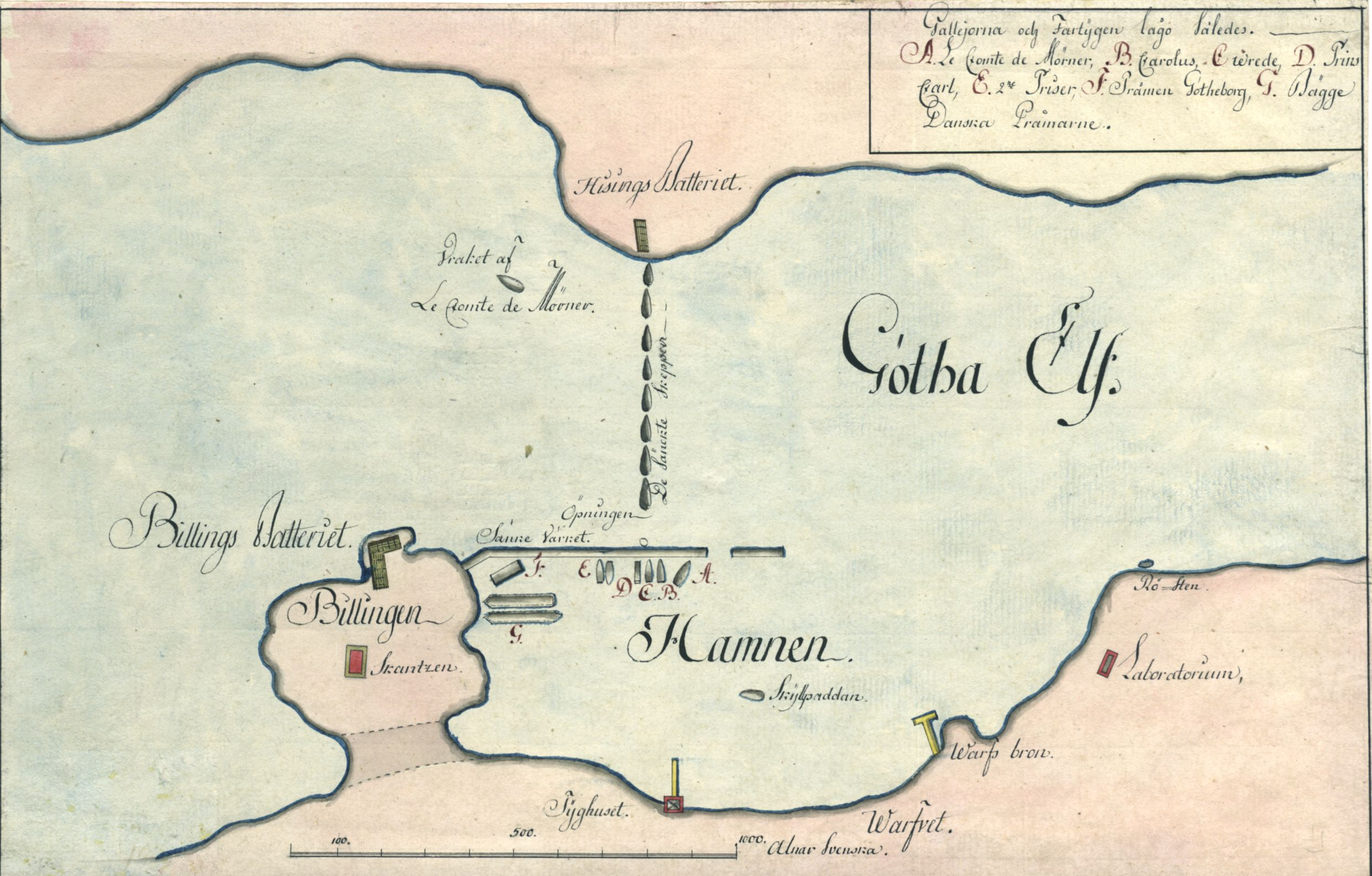
Map detailing Nya Varvet and its vessels during the time of the assault.

In the early hours of 1 September, a Swedish force based in Nya Varvet (New Shipyard) managed to overtake and capture a number of Danish vessels near Grötö. The ships captured totalled a galley, a bomber galiot, two barges as well as five cargo ships. The Swedish forces in the area were put on high alert, due to the fear of potential Danish reprisals.

In the night to 27 September, Tordenskjold sought revenge. Nine Danish slopes from Marstrand, under the command of Captain Oluf Budde, managed to sneak past Älvsborg fortress and its nearby artillery, towards Nya Varvet, where the remaining vessels of the Gothenburg Squadron and the captured Danish vessels were moored. The objective of the assault was to either recapture the Danish vessels and the rest of the Gothenburg Squadron, or to set them on fire.

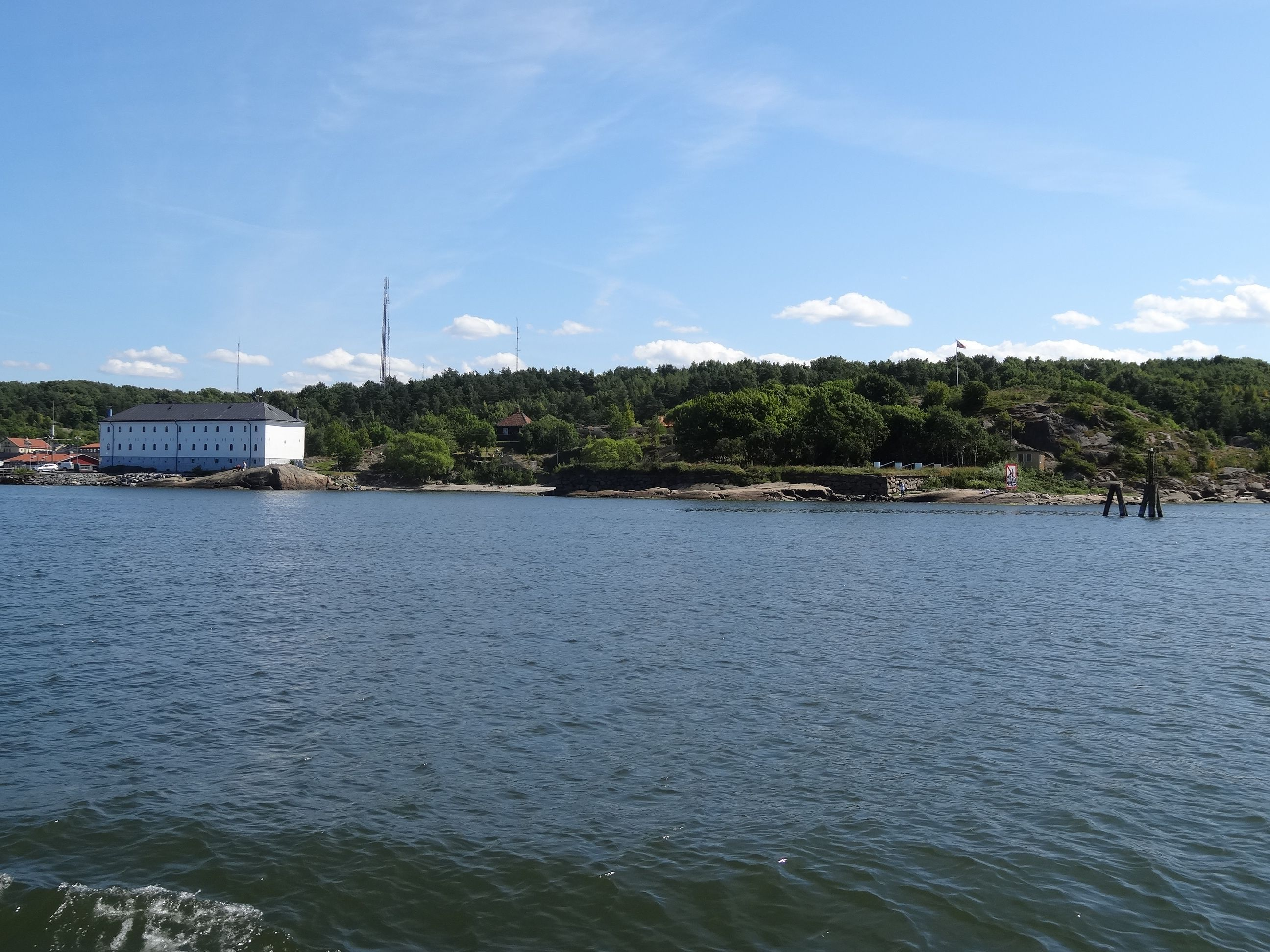
Lilla Billingen at Nya Varvet in the river entrance of Gothenburg, as seen from the north. The small red structure in the center is a guard hut. The current building from 1799 replaced an older building constructed in the early 1700s. Near the edge of the beach is the low battery, which has been used as a salute battery since the 1980s. The white building to the left was not present during the assault, it was built between 1754 and 1755.

During their advance, the Danes were discovered and called upon by the Swedish guard detail, stationed at Käringberget. When they were asked to identify themselves, they responded that they were "good Swedes" that were up to "Swedish shenanigans". The deception was successful, and they were sent on their way. The next guard station allowed them to pass, since they had already been allowed passage by the previous station. Upon their arrival at Nya Varvet, 30 Danish soldiers landed and were commanded by Captain Kleve. They were spotted and called upon by soldiers from the Saxon Infantry Regiment that were assigned to guard duty around the yard. The Germans didn't react to the Danes' dialect, or to their uniforms that had been turned inside out (the inside of the red Danish uniforms was blue), and allowed them to pass. The Danes proceeded toward the top of Lilla Billingen where the guardhouse was located. When they approached the building, the Danish soldiers breached the windows with their musketeers and Captain Kleve rushed in with his pistol drawn, ordering the twelve Saxon soldiers to surrender. The head of the guard force, Lieutenant Franck, was confused and was shot by Kleve.

After the guards had been incapacitated, the Danes attempted to navigate the ships out of the yard, but the majority of the vessels had to be left behind and were burnt. The galleys Carolus and the Wrede were among the burnt ships. Meanwhile, Tordenskjold himself arrived in a slope to Nya Varvet, but then the alarm had been raised because of a few guards escaping capture, and reporting the events to Major Ernbildt. The cannons of New Älvsborg were manned and started firing upon the Danes. The Danish force managed to slip away without casualties, and retrieved one galley. The largest Swedish vessel in the yard, the frigate Le Comte de Mörner, burnt down at Göta älv. This was the final battle between Sweden and Denmark during the Great Northern War.
