= SWEPOS =

SWEPOS is a support system for accurate measurement of Swedish geography using a network of fixed reference stations which gather GNSS data. The SWEPOS system permits mobile GPS/GLONASS receivers to receive detailed positioning data down to the centimeter level. The SWEPOS network of reference stations began as a co-operation between the National Land Survey of Sweden and Onsala Space Observatory.
