= Forsbäck =

Part of the locality Onsala, in Kungsbacka, Sweden

Coordinates: 57.450°N 12.049°E

Forsbäck is a part of the locality Onsala, situated in Kungsbacka Municipality on the west coast of Sweden. It has been registered as a småort in the Swedish system of cities and localities, but is nowadays just a part of Onsala.
