= Gathenhielm =

- Lars Gathenhielm (1689-1718), Swedish pirate and a privateer
- Ingela Olofsdotter Gathenhielm (1692–1729), Swedish privateer
