= New Älvsborg =

- Nya Älvsborg
- Gothenburg in Sweden
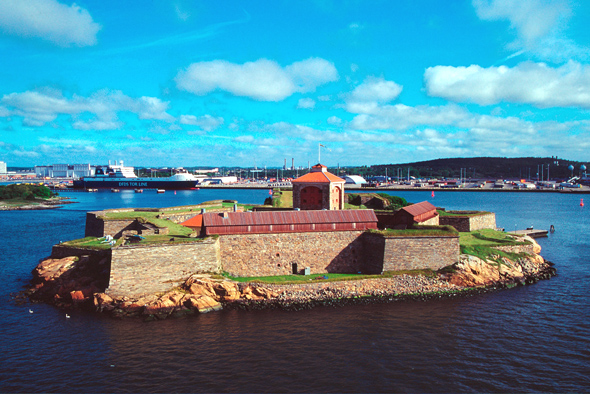
- New Älvsborg from the west, with Gothenburg in the background.

Site information
- Type: Sea fortress
- Open to the public: Yes

Location
- Location within Southern Sweden
- Coordinates: 57°41′6″N 11°50′20″E

Site history
- Built: 1653–1677
- Built by: Kingdom of Sweden
- In use: 1657–1869
- Materials: Granite, brick
- Battles/wars: Torstenson War, Scanian War, Great Northern War (Battles at Göta Älv), Theatre War

New Älvsborg, so-called to distinguish it from the earlier fortress at Old Älvsborg, is a sea fort on the island of Kyrkogårdsholmen within the urban area of modern Gothenburg, Sweden. Situated near the mouth of the Göta River, it protected what was at the time of its construction Sweden's only access to the North Sea and the Atlantic Ocean. Construction began in 1653, and the fortress remained in service until 1869, though it only saw significant action in one conflict, the Great Northern War.

== History ==
=== Background ===
During the Middle Ages, the Göta Älv river represented Sweden's sole point of access to the North Sea, as the coast to the north (Bohuslän) was part of Norway, while the area to the south (Halland) was part of Denmark. The river mouth was thus of immense strategic importance to Sweden, and in the fourteenth century the castle of Älvsborg (now known as Old Älvsborg) was constructed on the south bank of the river to control the vital estuary.

At the time, the main commercial settlement in the area was further upriver, at Lödöse, but this site was not ideal, as it lay upstream of the Danish-Norwegian fortress at Bohus, on the north bank of the river; thus in times of war the garrison there could disrupt river traffic between Lödöse and the sea. From the 1470s onwards, Swedish regents and kings therefore made repeated attempts to establish an alternative settlement downstream of Bohus. These new towns were repeatedly attacked and destroyed by the Danes, but in 1621 a permanent foundation, Gothenburg, was finally established, on the south bank a little way upriver of Old Älvsborg.

=== Construction ===
Plan of Nya Älvsborg. A: Harbour, B: Tower and church, C: Corps de Garde, D: Commandant's Quarters, E: Headquarters, F: Well, G: North Star Bastion, H: Prince Frederick Ravelin, I: Dolphin' Bastion, J: Beach Battery, K: Mermaid Bastion, L: Rosenlund Ravelin, M: Whale Bastion, N: Woodstore Ravelin, O: Lobster Bastion, P: Hospital, Q: West Corner, R: Smithy Ravelin, S: Stone Glacis, T: East Corner, U: Commandant's Garden

By this time it had become clear that the mediaeval castle at Old Älvsborg was no longer fit for purpose, as it had been captured with ease by the Danes during both the Northern Seven Years War and the Kalmar War. This had led to proposals that it should be replaced by a more modern fortress on the island of Kyrkogårdsholmen, which was a more easily defensible location and would also, being closer to the mouth of the Göta Älv, provide better protection for the new city at Gothenburg. However, nothing came of these proposals for several decades.

In May 1645, during the Torstenson War, the Danish admiral Ove Gjedde launched an attack on Gothenburg with 20 ships, but the city was successfully defended by a Dutch squadron in Swedish service commanded by Martin Thyssens, who was subsequently ennobled as Lord Anckarhjelm.

The fact that a Danish squadron had managed to sail without difficulty all the way up to Gothenburg led to the proposal for a fortress on Kyrkogårdsholmen to be revived in 1652. In 1653 the government of Axel Oxenstierna approved the plans for this 'New Älvsborg', and construction work began the same year.

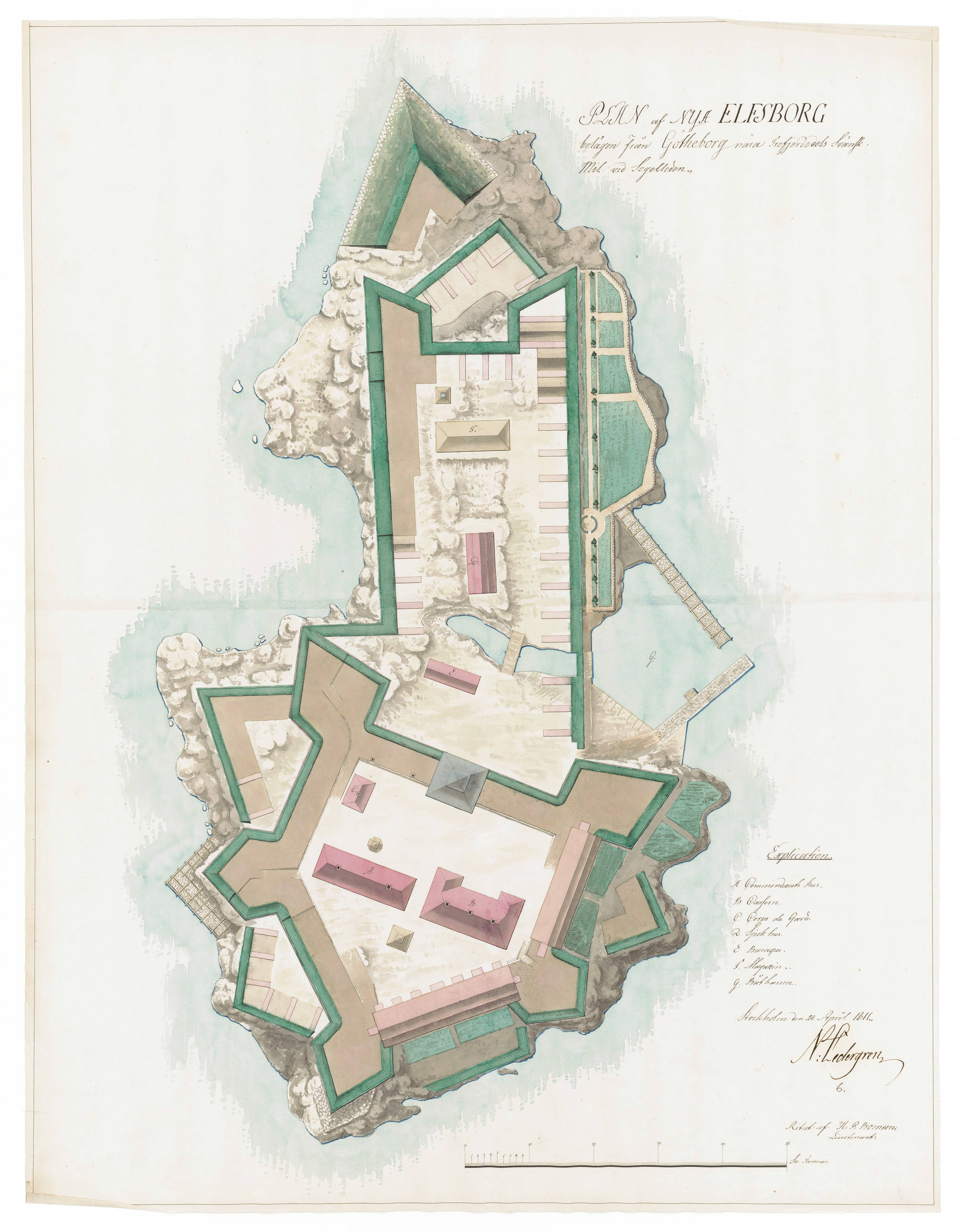
Drawing from 1811 showing the fortress New Älvsborg.

Bad weather and lack of money meant that progress was initially slow, and the fortress was still unfinished when Karl Gustav's War against Denmark-Norway broke out in 1657, but it was nevertheless pressed into service with cannons transferred from Old Älvsborg. In the event the Göta Älv did not see any fighting in this conflict, as the war ended rapidly with an overwhelming Swedish victory. Under the resulting Treaty of Roskilde, the Norwegian province of Bohuslen and the Danish province of Halland were both ceded to Sweden, which made the Göta Älv estuary - and thus by extension both Nya Älvsborg and Gothenburg - much less vulnerable to Danish-Norwegian attacks.

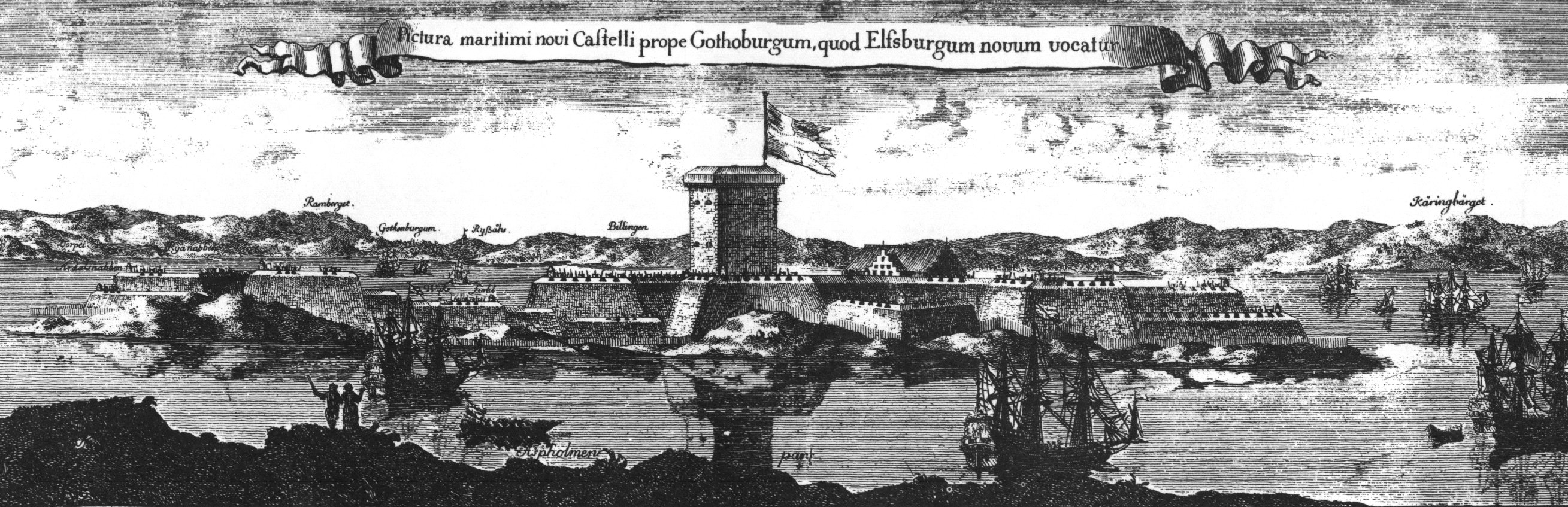
Elfsburgum Novum, as seen from Stora Aspholmen in Erik Dahlbergh's Suecia Antiqua et Hodierna.

In 1660, the decision was made to decommission Old Älvsborg, and much of the old castle's equipment and building materials were subsequently transferred to Nya Älvsborg, including the bells and pulpit from the chapel.

Nya Älvsborg first saw action during the Scanian War 1675–1679. On 16 July 1676 the Danish admiral Marquard Rodsten attempted to attack Gothenburg with six warships, but was driven off by cannon fire from Nya Älvsborg. Rodsten subsequently anchored his flotilla in the Gothenburg Archipelago in order to blockade the city, but the 42-gun ship København (Copenhagen) ran aground off the island of Grötö and had to be scuttled by her crew. The shoal on which the ship grounded has been known since that time as Köpenhamnsbådan ('the Copenhagen Shoal'). It was during the Scanian War that the fortifications of Nya Älvsborg were officially completed, in 1677.

=== Great Northern War ===
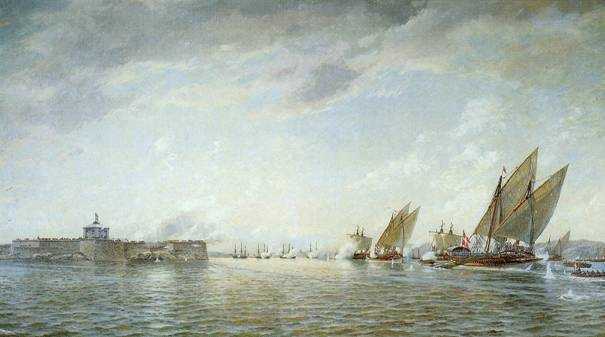
Tordenskjold's squadron sailing past Nya Älvsborg on the morning of 3 May 1717 after the repulse of his night attack on Nya Varvet. Painting by Jacob Hägg, Gothenburg Maritime Museum

See main article: Battles at Göta Älv

During the final few years of the Great Northern War, Charles XII of Sweden attempted to revive his flagging fortunes by mounting repeated invasions of Norway from Bohuslän. In order to reduce the powerful Norwegian fortresses at Fredriksten and Akershus, the Swedish army required a large siege train, which could only be transported by sea, and the charismatic Norwegian captain Peter Tordenskjold thus saw an opportunity to hamper Charles's plans by harassing the Swedish naval forces based at Gothenburg, thereby making it impossible for the siege train to be brought north.

As a result, there were frequent naval actions in and around the mouth of the Göta Älv during the years 1716–9. However, in general the Danish-Norwegian ships avoided coming too close to Nya Älvsborg, and so it was rarely involved in the fighting directly.

The exception to this was in the summer of 1719, when Tordenskjold decided to make a direct assault on Nya Älvsborg. Capturing an island fortress of this sort would be a difficult undertaking, but if it could be achieved then it would make the Göta Älv impassable to Swedish traffic at a single stroke. On July 19 and 20, Tordenskjold gathered his forces in the Gothenburg Archipelago, comprising seven ships of the line, two frigates, four galleys, three floating batteries, and four barges as troop transports.

New Älvsborg had at this time a garrison of around 360 men. These men comprised two companies of the Älvsborg Regiment, a company of the Saxon Infantry Regiment, and the fortress's artillery detachment. The commander of the garrison was Johan Abraham Lillie. The Swedish artillery amounted to around 90 pieces, varying in calibre and including both mortars and howitzers were also used.

On July 21, Tordenskjold set his plan in motion. Protected by the Danish-Norwegian warships, the floating batteries approached Nya Älvsborg and began to bombard it, while the barges landed troops and mortars on the Aspholmar, a string of islets in the river directly to the north of Kyrkogårdsholmen.

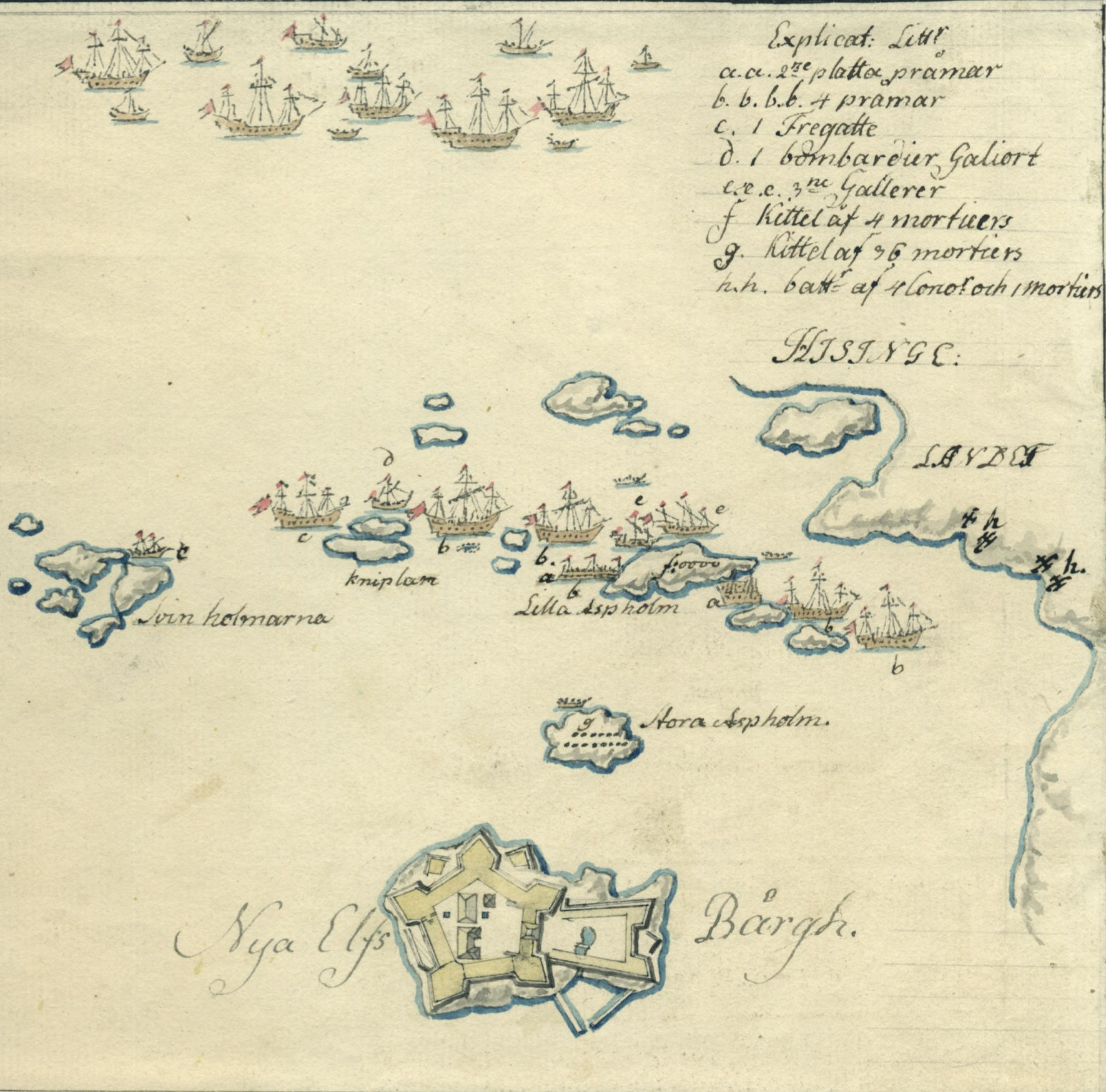
Map depicting the Danish-Norwegian positions during the siege of Nya Älvsborg, July 1719.

From the Aspholmar, the Danish-Norwegian artillery could subject New Älvsborg to a heavy bombardment. The fortress suffered continuous fire for three days without pause, causing significant damage. Lillie nevertheless refused to surrender, responding to the Danish-Norwegian calls for surrender with that he "would rather be brought back to Gothenburg as a dead Lillie than as a living Danckwardt", referring to the late Henrich Danckwardt, who had been convicted of cowardice by a Swedish court-martial for surrendering Marstrand and executed.

On 24 July, troops of the Skaraborg Regiment commanded by Georg Bogislaus Staël von Holstein managed to set up cannons on the south side of Hisingen, from which they could begin counter-battery fire against the Danish-Norwegian mortars in Aspholmarna. The Danish-Norwegian batteries were damaged but remained in operation. However, shortly thereafter three Swedish galleys from Nya Varvet, the Carolus, Wrede and the Lucretia, managed to mount a seaborne attack on the Aspholmarna batteries, capturing four mortars, 60 bombs and three barrels of gunpowder. This rendered the siege untenable, and the Danish-Norwegian forces withdrew shortly thereafter. Swedish casualties during the siege amounted to 30 dead and 70 wounded, Captain Lillie himself being among the latter. 60 Danish-Norwegians died and 73 were wounded.

=== Since 1720 ===
Over the course of the eighteenth century, the defences at New Älvsborg were increasingly neglected. The fortress was placed on alert during the 1788-9 Theatre War against Denmark-Norway, but did not see any action. When King Gustav IV Adolf visited New Älvsborg in February 1801, amidst a scare about a possible British attack, he found the fortress to be in a state of disrepair.

Most of New Älvsborg's guns were removed in the 1830s, with the exception of a few saluting pieces, and with that the fortress lost its military function and became a largely ceremonial installation. A custom arose whereby each ship passing Nya Älvsborg was obliged to make a small gift to the commander of the garrison, often a bottle of wine or spirits; as such this posting became highly coveted, and was generally given to retired army officers as a sort of sinecure.

In 1868 the Army Administration took the decision to decommission Nya Älvsborg altogether. On 22 April 1869 it was officially removed from the list of royal fortresses, and on 1 May the garrison left for the final time.

The Commandant's House was converted into an inn in 1881. Today New Älvsborg is a listed building (byggnadsminne) and a popular tourist attraction.

== See also ==
- Gothenburg
- Old Älvsborg
- Älvsborg Fortress
- Torstenson War
- Scanian War
- Great Northern War
