= Onsala Space Observatory =

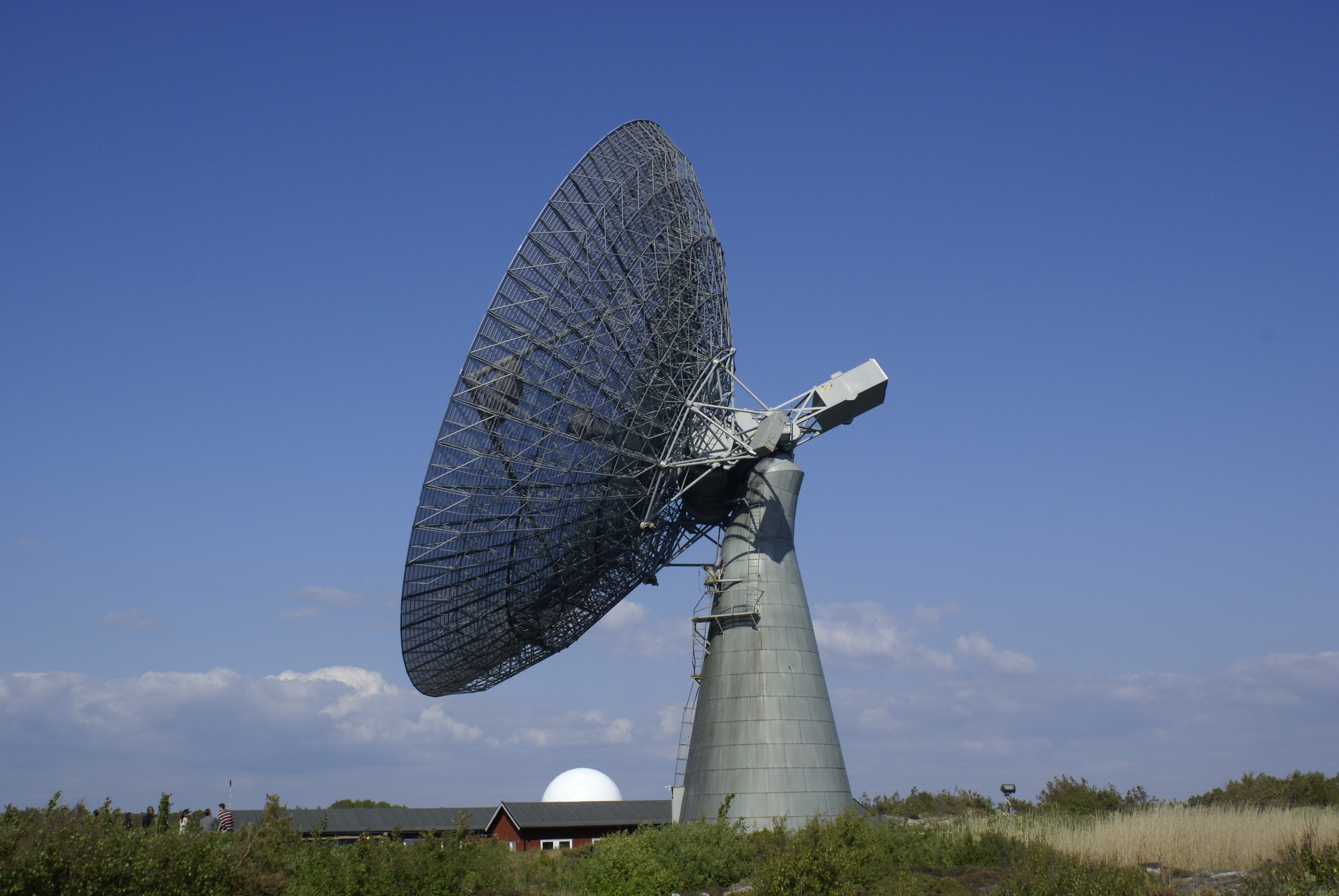
- The 25-metre telescope
- Alternative names: Swedish National Facility for Radio Astronomy
- Organization: Chalmers University of Technology
- Location: Kungsbacka Municipality, Halland County, Sweden
- Coordinates: 57°23′35″N 11°55′04″E
- Altitude: 20 m (66 ft)
- Established: 1949
- Website: www.chalmers.se/en/researchinfrastructure/oso/Pages/default.aspx
- Telescopes: Onsala Space Observatory 20 m telescope; Onsala Space Observatory 25 m telescope; Onsala Space Observatory LOFAR station
- Location of Onsala Space Observatory
- Related media on Commons

Onsala Space Observatory (OSO), the Swedish National Facility for Radio Astronomy, provides scientists with equipment to study the Earth and the rest of the Universe. The observatory operates two radio telescopes in Onsala, 45 km south of Gothenburg, and takes part in several international projects. Examples of activities:

- The 20 and 25 m telescopes in Onsala: Studies of the birth and death of stars, and of molecules in the Milky Way and other galaxies.
- LOFAR station: The Swedish station in the international radio telescope LOFAR is located at the observatory.
- VLBI: Telescopes in different countries are linked together for better resolution ("sharper images").
- ALMA, e-VLBI, Herschel Space Observatory, SKA: Developing and using new radio astronomical facilities.
- APEX: Radio telescope in Chile for sub-millimetre waves. Research about everything from planets to the structure of the Universe.
- Odin: Satellite for studies of, e.g., the Earth's atmosphere and molecular clouds in the Milky Way.
- Space geodesy: Radio telescopes (VLBI) and satellites (GPS) are used to measure movements in Earth's crust and water vapour in the atmosphere.
- Receiver development: Laboratories for development of sensitive radio receivers.
- Event Horizon Telescope: A project to create a large telescope array for observing the immediate environment of the Milky Way's supermassive black hole Sagittarius A*, et.c.

Onsala Space Observatory was founded in 1949 by professor Olof Rydbeck. The observatory is hosted by Department of Earth and Space Science at Chalmers University of Technology, and is operated on behalf of the Swedish Research Council.

== 25-metre telescope ==
The 25.6 m diameter, polar mount decimeter-wave telescope in Onsala is equipped with receivers for frequencies up to 7 GHz. It is used for astronomical VLBI observations. It is also operated as a single dish for studies of molecular clouds in the Galaxy. The telescope was built in 1963.

== 20-metre telescope ==
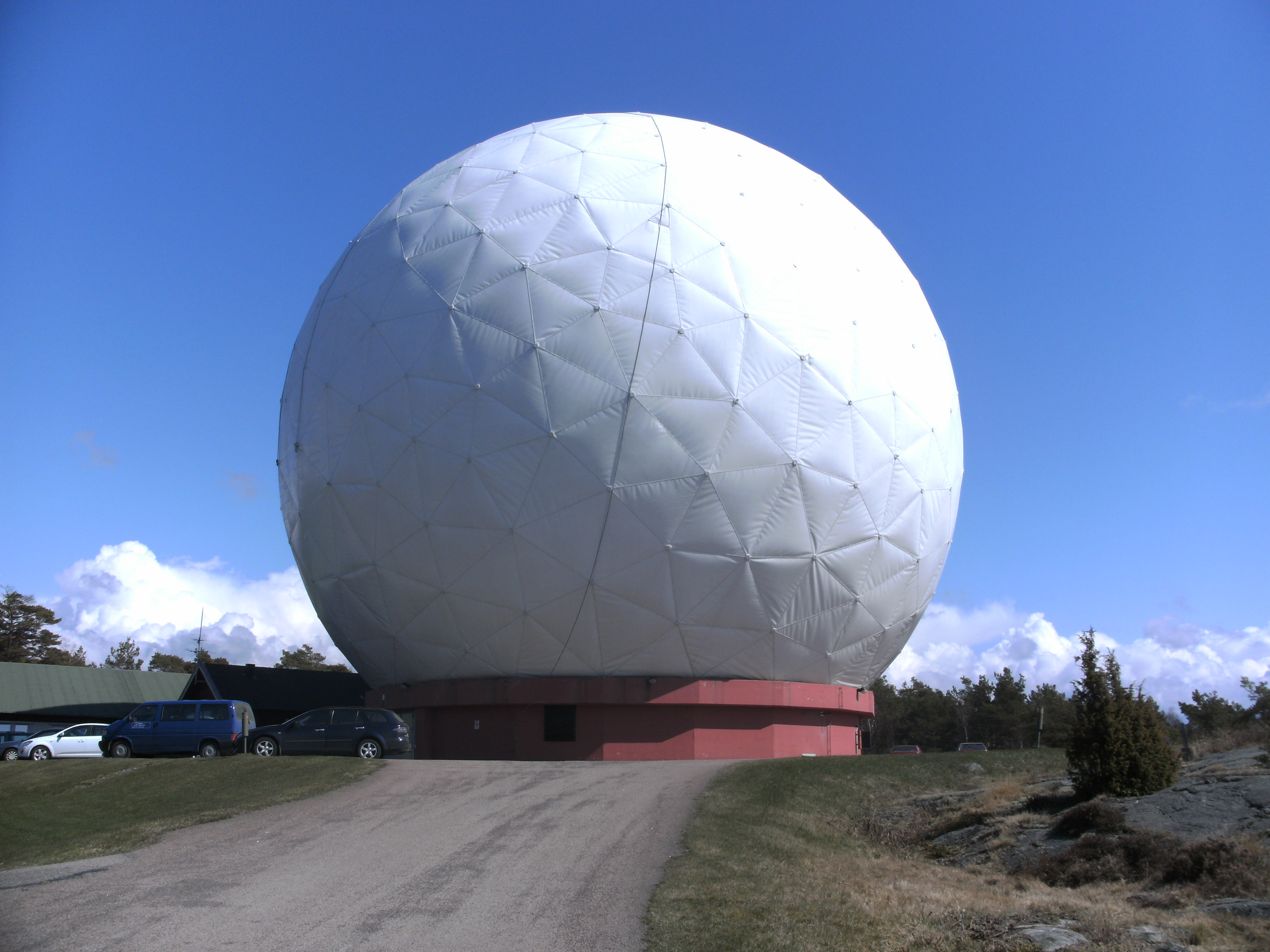
The 20-metre telescope enclosed in its radome

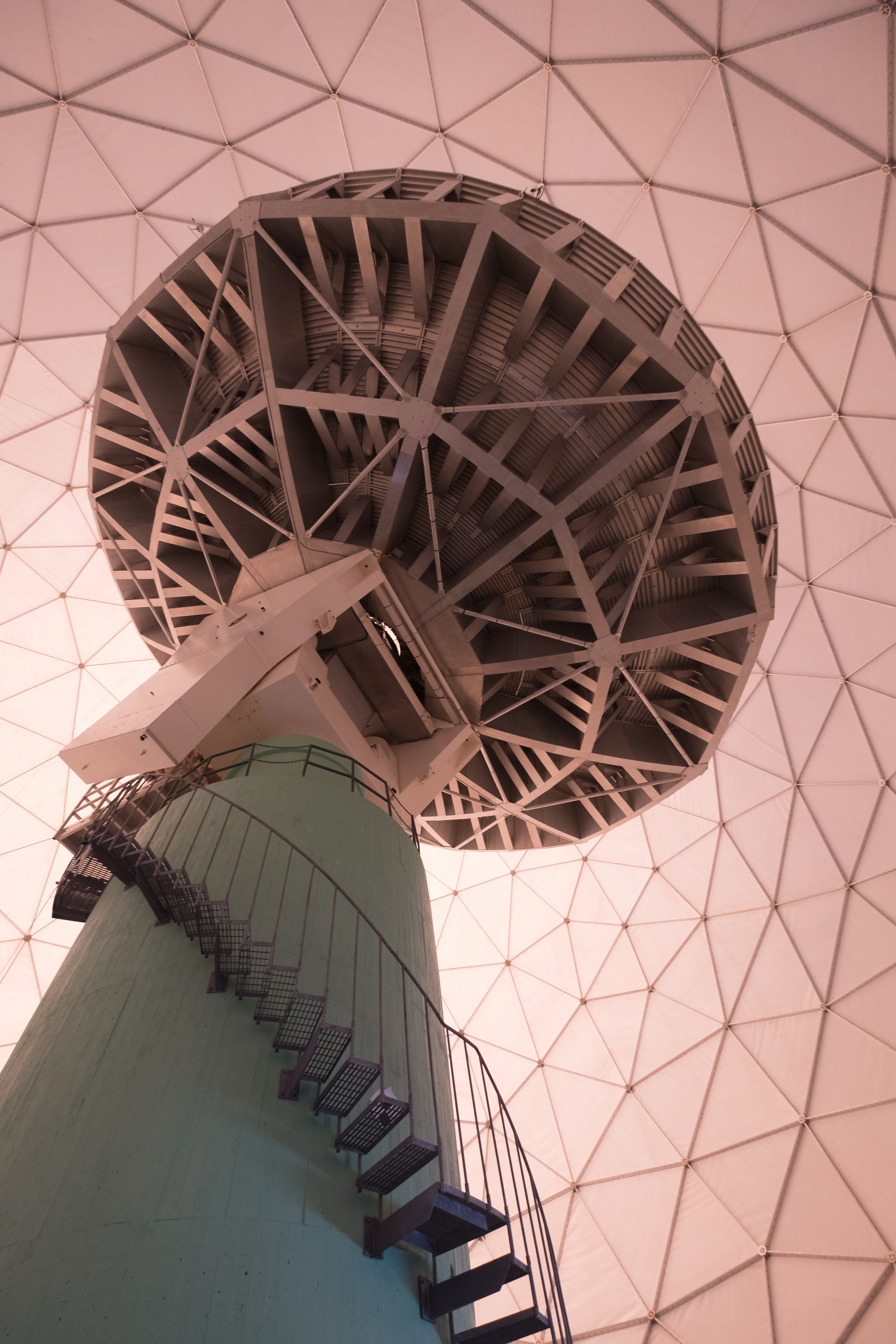
20m telescope inside the radome

The 20 m diameter millimetre wave telescope in Onsala is equipped with receivers for frequencies up to 116 GHz. It is used for observations of millimetre wave emission from molecules in comets, circumstellar envelopes, and the interstellar medium in the Galaxy and in extragalactic objects. The telescope is enclosed in a radome of diameter 30 m.

It is also used for astronomical VLBI observations of star forming regions, radio stars, and active galactic nuclei, and for geodetic VLBI observations to study e.g. crustal dynamics and polar motion. The telescope was built in 1975-76 and upgraded in 1992.

It is also used, as part of the European and worldwide networks, for astronomical Very Long Baseline Interferometry (VLBI) observations of star forming regions, radio stars, and active galactic nuclei, and for geodetic VLBI observations to study e.g. crustal dynamics and polar motion.

=== Receivers ===
The telescope is equipped with the following receivers:

Frequency range	Receiver temperature	Receiver type	Polarization
2.2–2.4 GHz	60 K	HEMT amplifier	Single
8.2–8.4 GHz	80 K	HEMT amplifier	Dual
18.0–26.0 GHz	30 K	HEMT amplifier	Dual
26.0–36.0 GHz	50 K	HEMT amplifier	Single
36.0–49.8 GHz	50 K	HEMT amplifier	Dual
85–116 GHz	80–130 K	SIS mixer	Single

== LOFAR station ==
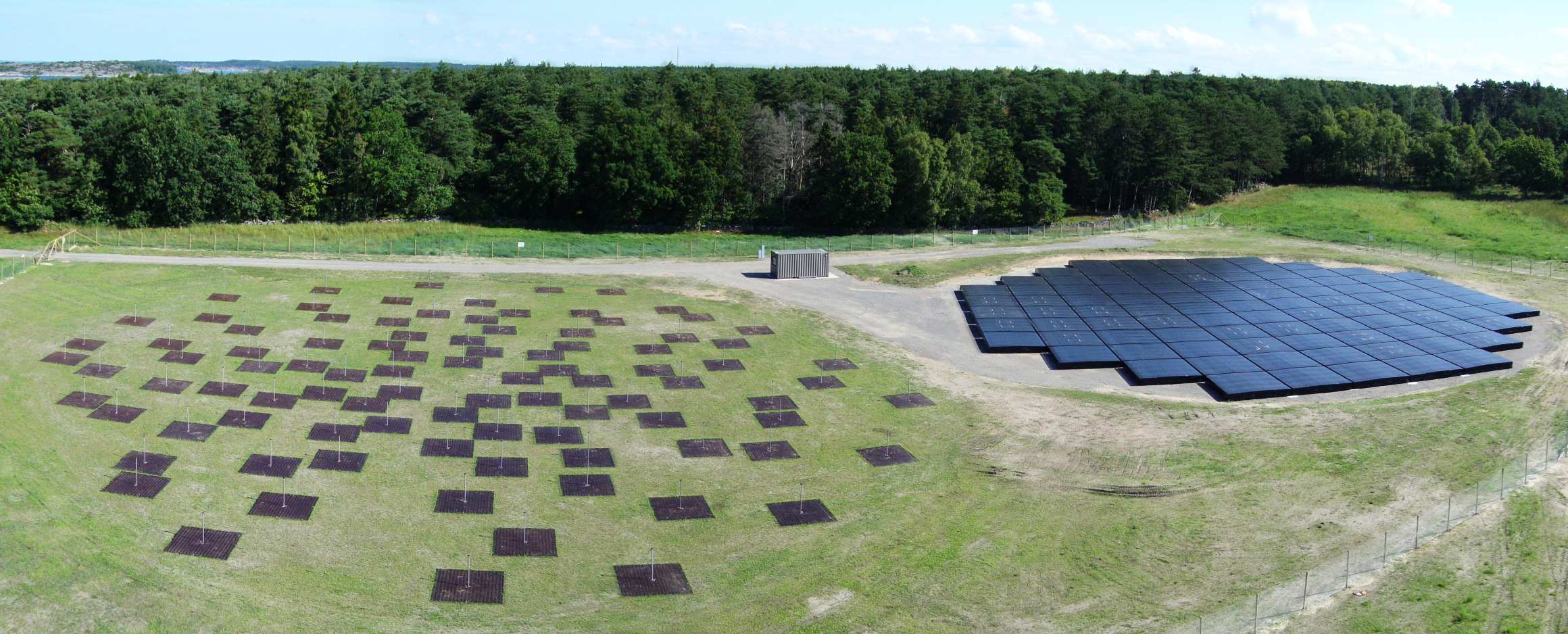
The LOFAR station at Onsala Space Observatory

The Swedish station in the international radio telescope LOFAR is located at Onsala Space Observatory. It was completed in 2011.

== Nordic ALMA node ==
The Onsala Space Observatory currently hosts the Nordic ALMA node, which is part of the European ALMA regional centre (ARC). The Nordic ALMA node provides face-to-face support for any astronomer that wants to use the ALMA telescope and primarily supports the Nordic scientific community.
