= Ingela Gathenhielm =

Swedish shipowner and privateer

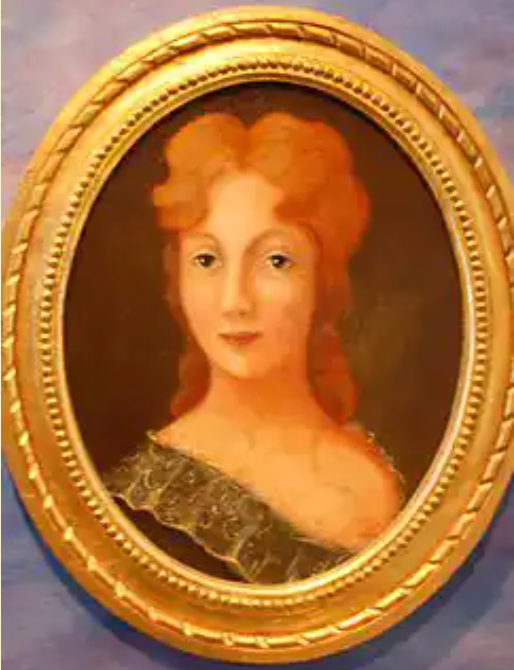
Ingela Olofsdotter Gathenhielm

Ingela Olofsdotter Gathenhielm (née Hammar; 11 September 1692 – 29 April 1729) was a Swedish shipowner and privateer in service of King Charles XII of Sweden during the Great Northern War.

== Biography ==
Ingela Gathenhielm was born in Onsala as a daughter of the shipowner Olof Hammar and Gunilla Mårtensdotter. In 1711, Ingela married Lars Gathenhielm. Ingela and Lars had lived on adjacent farms as children and met at a young age. After their wedding, they settled in Gothenburg. Ingela was constantly pregnant during her first marriage, giving birth to five children in just five years; only two survived to adulthood, sons Anders (1714–1768) and Lars (1717–1768).

=== Privateering ===
The couple had both grown up in families involved in the privateering activity in Onsala.

In 1710, Lars Gathenhielm was granted royal permission to attack and plunder ships from all nations belonging to the enemy of Sweden during the Great Nordic War. Reportedly, in practice he did in fact attack ships from non-enemy nations as well, making the activity illegal piracy. The spoils were sold in Dunkerque (or Dunkirk) in northern France. Lars made a fortune, inducted to the Gothenburg city guild in 1715 and ennobled, alongside his brother Christian, for his service to the crown.

Many stories and legends have been told about Ingela Gathenhielm. She was reported to have been deeply involved in the seafarings of Lars as his business companion, adviser, and the mastermind behind many of his affairs. She was also a privateer herself, which wasn't odd in 18th-century Sweden, where married women were expected to assist their husbands in business. What's confirmed is that when Lars died in 1718, Ingela inherited his royal privateering permit and continued to manage his fleet (and his alleged pirate empire). This wouldn't have been regarded as controversial for the standards of that time, when widows by law inherited the business of their late spouses, even if the business, in this case, was unconventional; her contemporary Margareta von Ascheberg also inherited a war office in the same war. She was called the Kapardrottningen ('Privateering Queen').

The Swedish privateering licenses were retracted after the peace treaty between Denmark in 1720 and Russia in 1721. After the Peace, Ingela issued several lengthy lawsuits against the Crown for monetary compensation for the costs she had as a privateer in the service of the crown, which did in fact give her military status of a kind; this continued until after her death and was inherited by her second spouse.

=== Later life ===
Aside from her activity as a privateer, Ingela managed several other businesses in Gothenburg. She inherited the ropewalk factory and the shipping business from her spouse. She expanded it by founding many other businesses such as a bakery, forge, distillery and Sailmaker factory. She became successful in these businesses, particularly the ropewalk factory, which reportedly equipped a large part of the ships of Gothenburg.

In 1722, Ingela married the lieutenant colonel Isak Browald. She was also frequently pregnant during her second marriage, giving birth to four children in just five years, although again only two of them survived into adulthood.

Ingela died in 1729, and was buried alongside her first husband in the Gathenhielm family tomb in Onsala, Sweden, beneath the tower of the church.

== Legacy ==
A street in Västra Frölunda is named after her: Ingela Gathenhielms gata ('Ingela Gathenhielm Street').
