= Onsala =

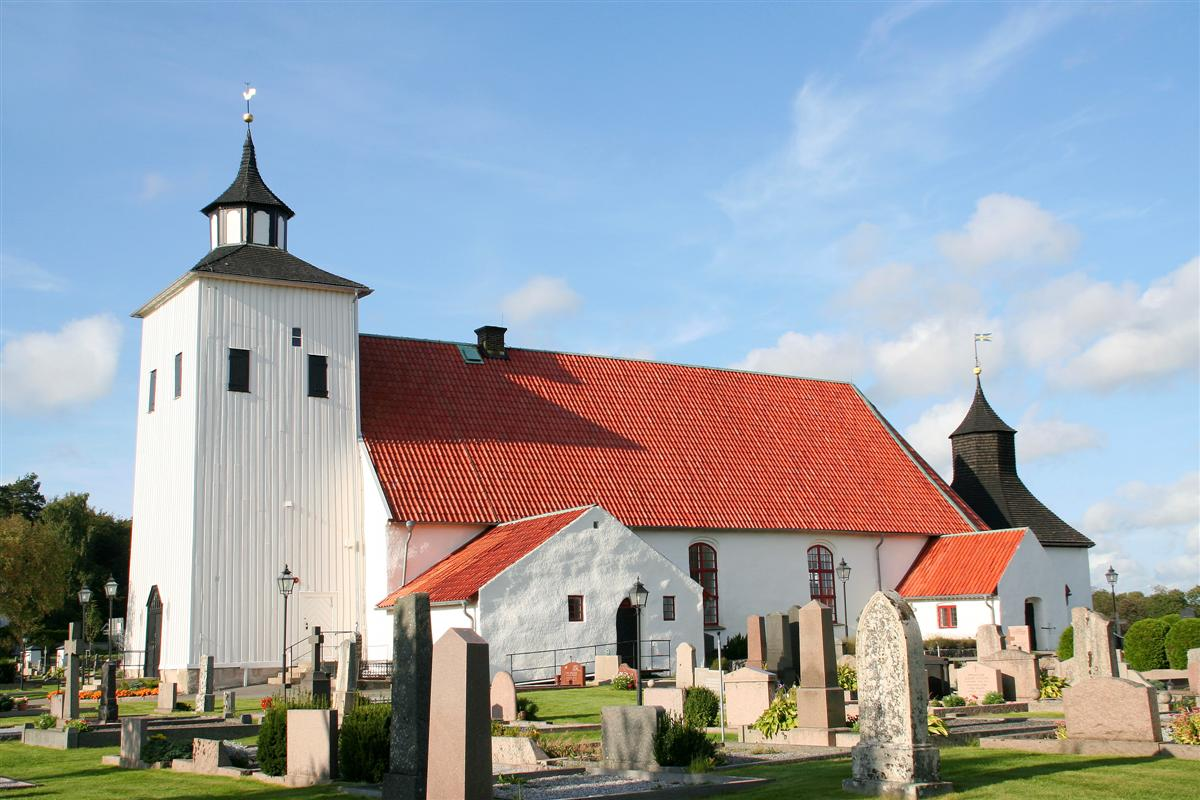
- Church in Onsala from the 12th century

- Location within Halland Location within Sweden
- Coordinates: 57°24′53″N 12°01′21″E
- Country: Sweden
- Province: Halland
- County: Halland County
- Municipality: Kungsbacka Municipality

Area
  - Total: 10.53 km^{2} (4.07 sq mi)

Population (31 December 2020)
  - Total: 12,415
  - Density: 1,135/km^{2} (2,940/sq mi)
- Time zone: UTC+1 (CET)
  - Summer (DST): UTC+2 (CEST)

Onsala (Swedish pronunciation: [ˈʊ̂nːˌsɑːla]) is a locality situated in Kungsbacka Municipality, Halland County, Sweden, with 11,951 inhabitants in 2010. It is also a 14 km long peninsula on the west coast of Sweden, facing Kattegat, 40 kilometres (25 mi) south of Gothenburg. It dates back to the age of the vikings and was originally an area devoted to the god Odin, the name being a corruption of the old norse Odin's Sala. In English "The Halls of Odin"

The population is around 12-14,000 with a densely inhabited east coast, mainly consisting of single-family homes. The biggest village is Gottskär, in older days a fishing village, and which today has a few restaurants and a leisure boat harbour. Lars Gathenhielm was born in the old parish of Onsala. He was a Swedish privateer commissioned by the king to raid Danish ships. His wife, Ingela, took over his business as a privateer as a widow. They are interred in a basement crypt beneath the smaller tower of the church. Their white sarcophagi have carved "jolly rogers" at the foot end.

Onsala is also home to the Onsala Space Observatory, the Swedish national radio observatory.

== Sports ==
The following sports clubs are located in Onsala:

- Onsala BK
