= Lars Gathenhielm =

Swedish sailor

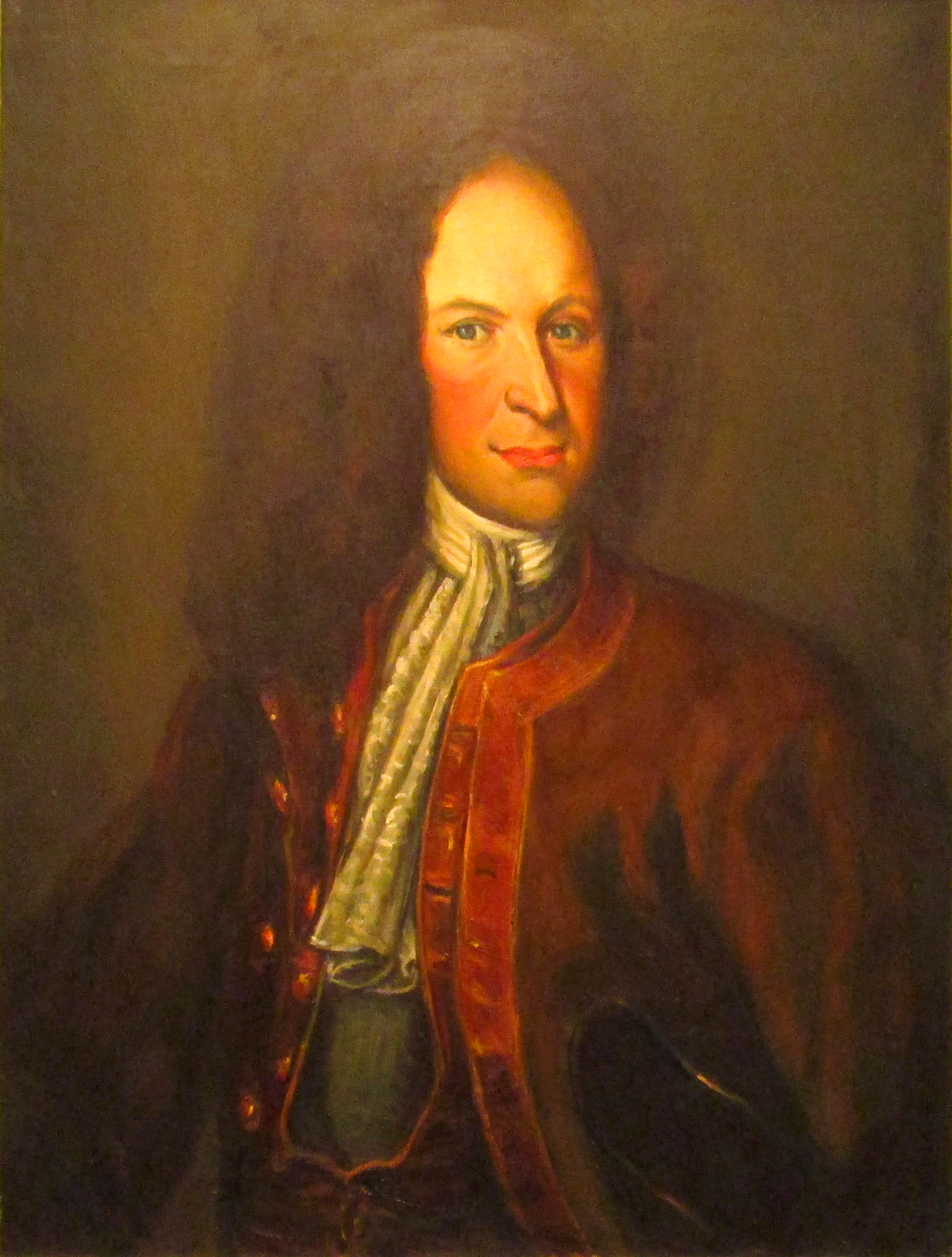
Probable portrait of Lars Gathenhielm

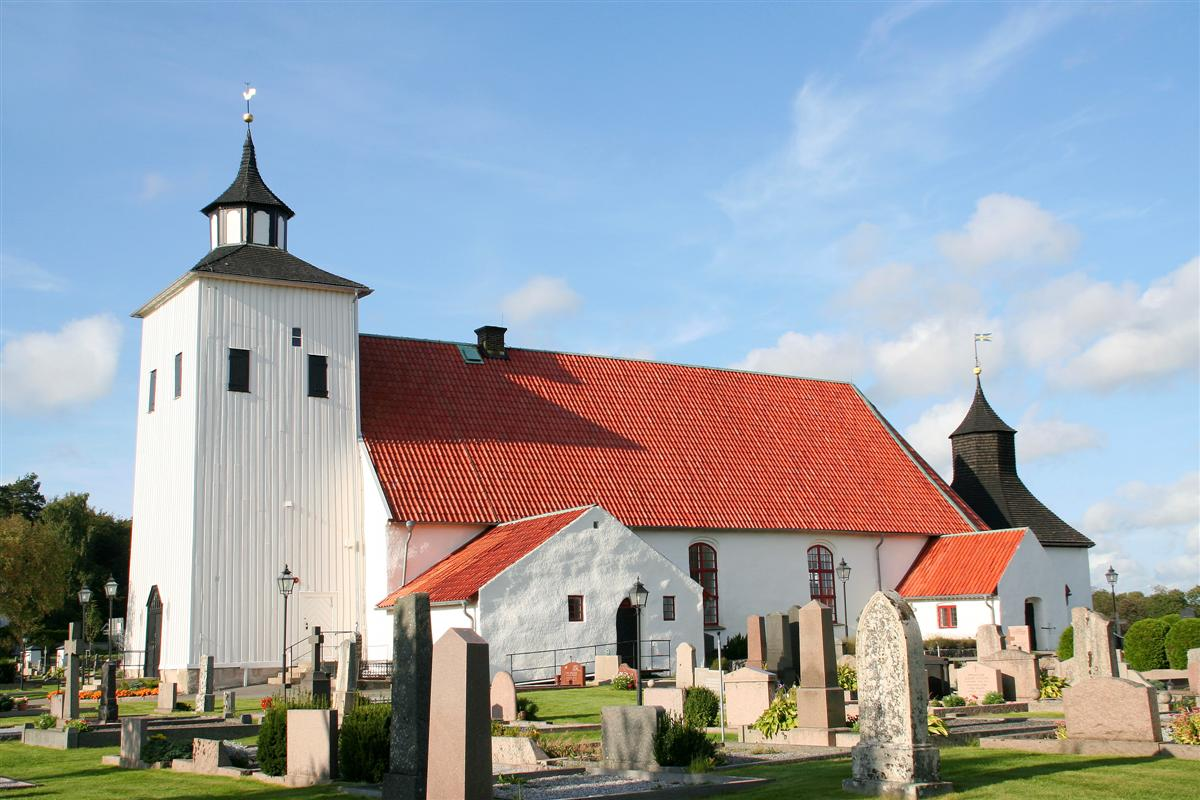
Onsala Church in Halland burial site of Lars and Ingela Gathenhielm

Lars Gathenhielm (originally Lars Andersson Gathe; 1689–1718) was a Swedish sea captain, commander, shipowner, merchant, and privateer.

== Biography ==
Lars Gathenhielm was born on the Gatan estate in Onsala Parish in Halland. His parents were the sea captain Anders Börjesson Gathe and his wife Kerstin Larsdtr Styrman, daughter of a mill owner in Hjälm, Fjärås Parish. Before his knighthood in 1715, he was known as Lars Andersson Gathe or Lasse i Gatan.

To protect Swedish shipping from pirates and to harm the enemy, in June 1710 the government of King Charles XII of Sweden gave Lars Gathe Letter of marque granting permission to seize ships from enemy nations including Denmark and Russia. His vessels captured foreign merchant vessels and forced them into port where both cargo and ships were sold. The spoils were also sold at Dunkerque in northern France. He had a great deal of early success with his galleon Lilla Jägaren, and as the volume of hijackings increased, many local sailors were quickly recruited to work the privateer ships. He suffered from a hip injury that made him dependent on crutches and may not have spent much time at sea himself, instead directing the work from Gothenburg.

Gathenhielm was accused of piracy against Swedish ships as well, but was protected by the king himself and therefore never punished. He and his brother Christen (1682-1722) were ennobled in 1715 under the surname Gathenhielm for their efforts on behalf of Swedish navigation. Gathenhielm was later also appointed commodore in the Royal Swedish Navy. Lars Gathenhielm died from tuberculosis at his house at Lilla Torget in Gothenburg in 1718 at the age of 29. His wife Ingela Gathenhielm née Hammar (1692–1729), who he had married in 1711, succeeded him and expanded the various business enterprises. Following their deaths, they were both buried in the Gathenhielm family tomb at Onsala Church.

== Other sources ==
- Lars Ericson Wolke (1997) Lasse i Gatan. Kaparkriget och det svenska stormaktsväldets fall (Historiska Media) ISBN 91-88930-13-0

== Related reading ==
- Göteborg - handbok för resande, Octavia Carlén 1869 s. 125-130
- Berättelser ur Göteborgs Historia under envåldstiden, H. Fröding 1922 s. 300-315
- Majornas Kyrkokrönika, Per Pehrsson 1926
- Det forna Majorna, Axel Rosén 1940
- Kronologiska anteckningar om viktigare händelser i Göteborg 1619–1982, Göteborgs Hembygdsförbund 1982
- Göteborg berättar, Bengt A. Öhnander 1991
- Göteborgs gatunamn, Greta Baum 2001
