= Perelle =

Perelle or Pérelle is a surname, and may refer to:

- Adam Perelle (1640–1695), French artist and writer, son of Gabriel Perelle
- Auguste Jubé de La Perelle (1765–1824), French general, politician and historiographer
- Gabriel Perelle (1604–1677), French draftsman and printmaker of topographic views and landscapes
- Nicolas Perelle (1631–1695), French painter and engraver, son of Gabriel Perelle

== See also ==
- SS Perelle
