= Skansen Lejonet =

1600s fortification in Sweden

The Lion Sconce
- Skansen Lejonet
- Gothenburg in Sweden
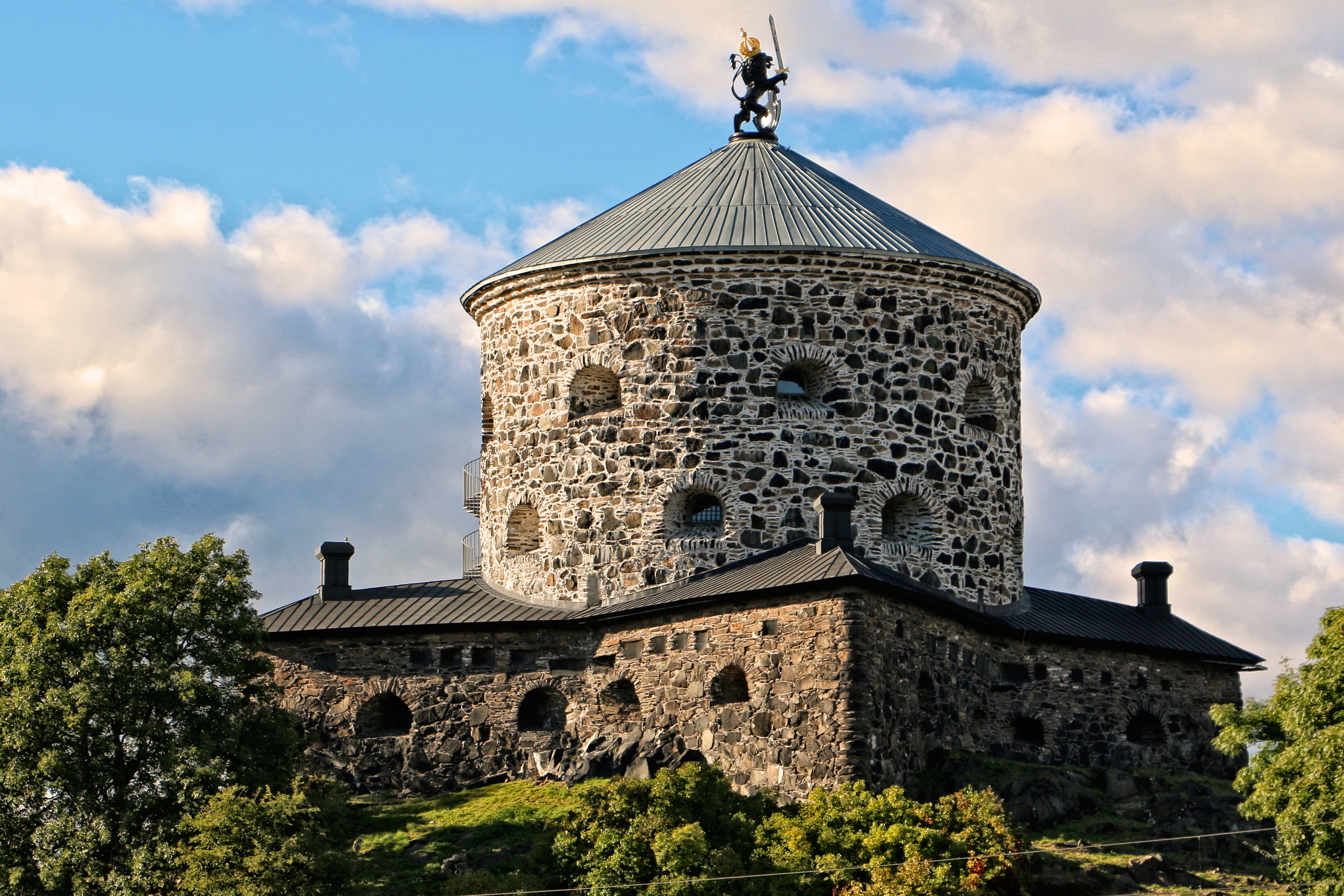
- Skansen Lejonet

Site information
- Type: Sconce
- Owner: Götiska Förbundet
- Open to the public: Yes
- Website: "Skansen Lejonet". Götiska Förbundet.

Location
- Coordinates: 57°42′51″N 11°59′22″E

Site history
- Built: 1687–1692
- Built by: Kingdom of Sweden
- In use: 1687–1822
- Materials: Granite, gneiss, diabase

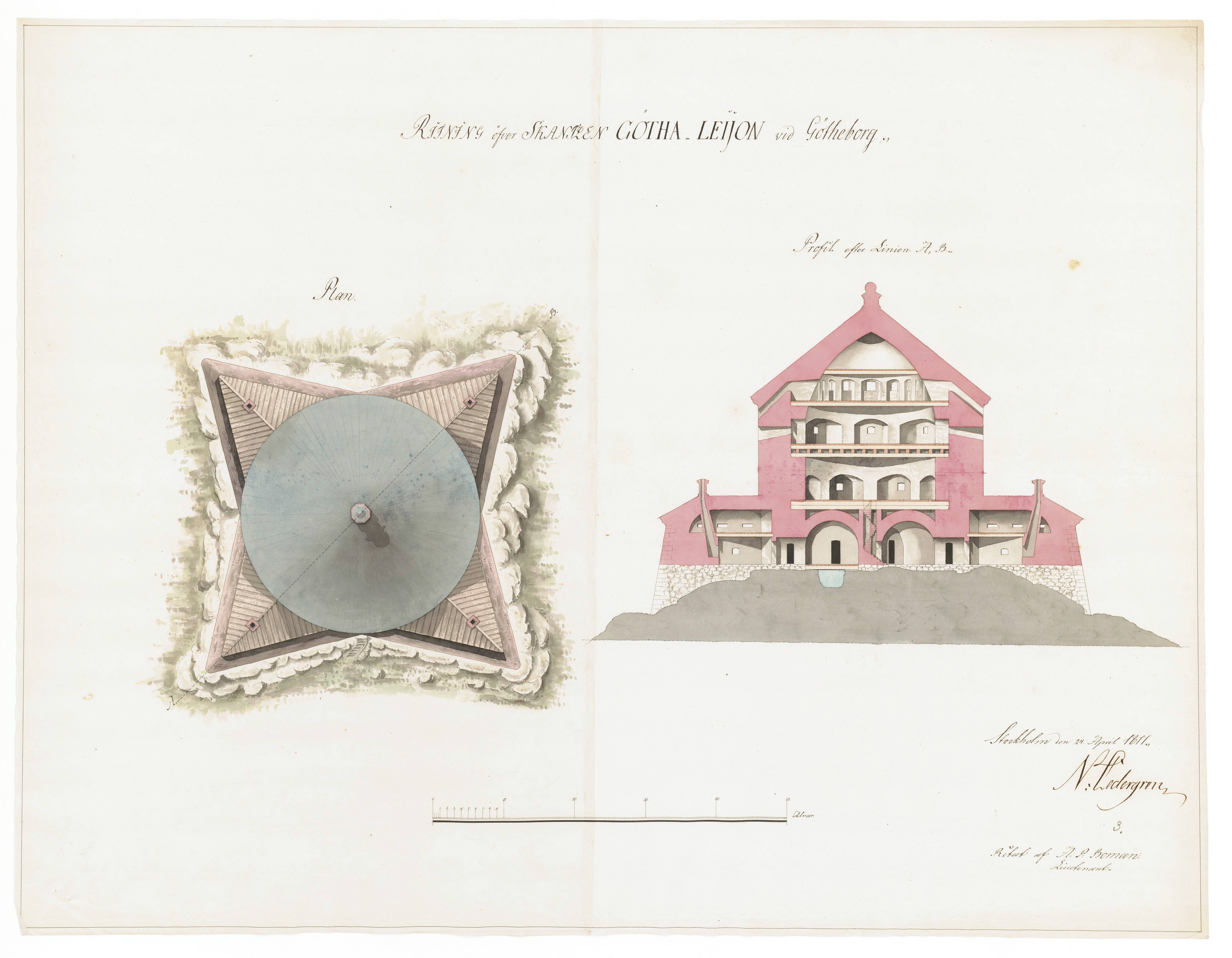
Drawing from 1811 of Skansen Lejonet.

Skansen Lejonet ("the Lion Sconce"), formally Westgötha Leijon ("the Westrogothic Lion"), is a redoubt on the hill Gullberg in Gothenburg, Sweden, built in 1687–92 on the site of an earlier medieval castle. It was decommissioned in 1822 and has since served a range of other purposes.

The fortress and its twin, Skansen Kronan, were built to protect the city of Gothenburg against possible Danish attack, and thus had a similar purpose to the sea fort of New Älvsborg, which was built around the same time.

== Gullberg Castle ==
Skansen Lejonet was erected on the site of an older medieval castle, known as Gullbergs hus (literally 'Gullberg's House'). According to the Erik's Chronicle, it was built in 1285 by King Birger. It had evidently fallen into disrepair by 1455, as it had to be rebuilt in that year by Tord Karlsson Bonde, only to be destroyed by the Danes in 1523, during the Swedish War of Liberation; it was rebuilt again by the early Vasa kings, only to be destroyed once more by the Danes in July 1612, during the Kalmar War.

== History ==
The city of Gothenburg was founded in 1621. The new settlement was equipped with an impressive network of fortifications, but military engineers were concerned by the fact that the city was overlooked by two hills, the Gullberg and the Risåsberg, and so it was decided to construct forts on both hilltops to prevent potential attackers from siting artillery there. The two forts were designed by Erik Dahlbergh, with the one on the Risåsberg being named Skansen Kronan and the one on the Gullberg being named Skansen Westgötha Leijon. The latter name, which alluded to the fact that the lion is a symbol of Västergötland province, was soon truncated in colloquial speech to Skansen Lejonet, or simply Lejonet ('the Lion').

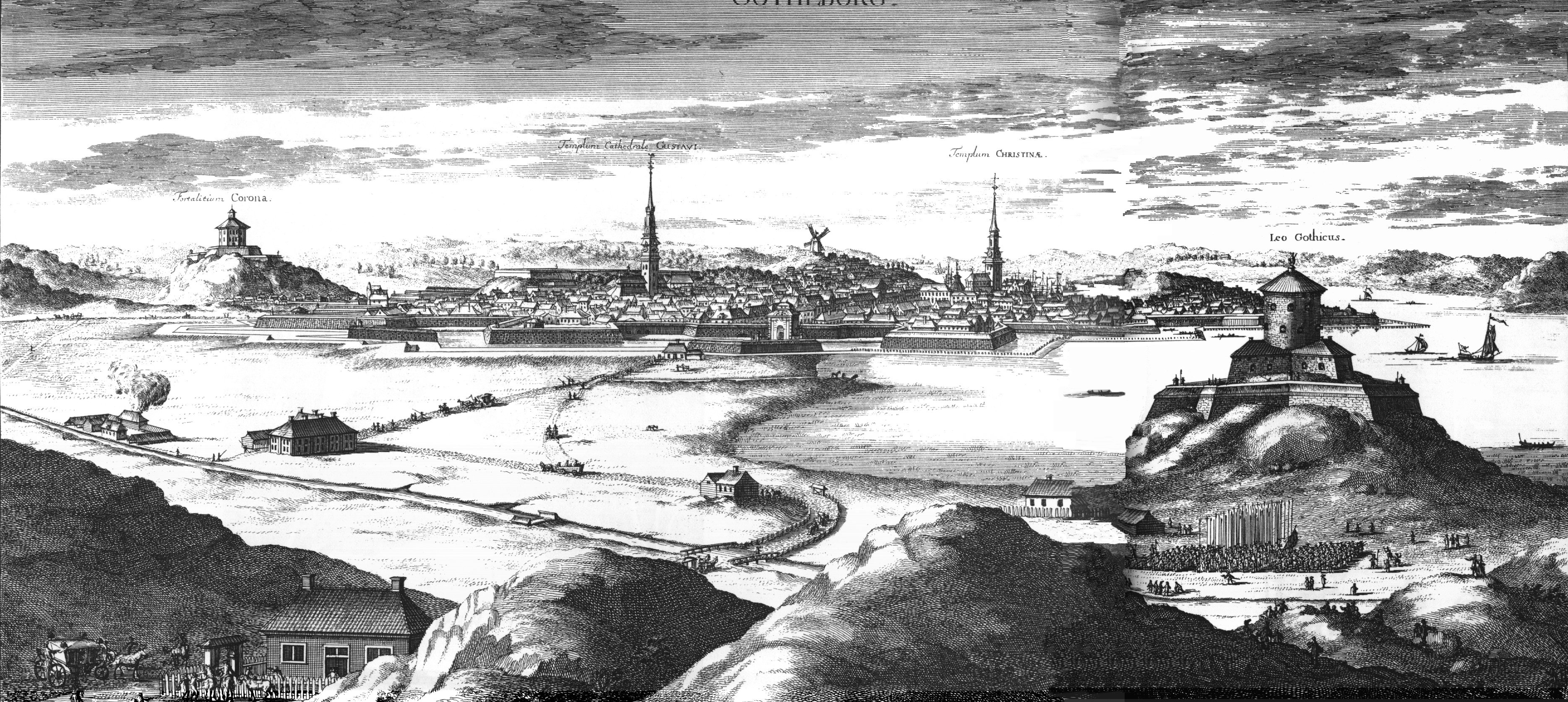
Skansen Lejonet (right) as depicted in Erik Dahlbergh's Suecia antiqua et hodierna (1690–1710). The fort is labelled Leo Gothicus, the Latin translation of its official name Westgötha Leijon.

At the time, Gullberg was separated from the city walls by a substantial expanse of open ground, as can be clearly seen in Dahlbergh's illustrations of Gothenburg, including the by-then finished Skansen Lejonet, from his famous Suecia antiqua et hodierna (1690–1710). However, as the city expanded, Gullberg was enveloped by urban sprawl, and today Skansen Lejonet is situated in the middle of the marshalling yards outside Gothenburg Central Station. The fortress is nevertheless still accessible on foot.

The construction of Skansen Lejonet began in May 1687. On 10 September 1689, the construction site was visited by King Charles XI, accompanied by a number of other dignitaries. According to later accounts of the occasion by Dahlbergh and other witnesses, the king and his entourage climbed onto the roof of the half-finished fortress and drank a series of toasts. The seven-year old Crown Prince Charles, the future King Charles XII, was also present, and drew a picture of Skansen Lejonet which is still preserved.

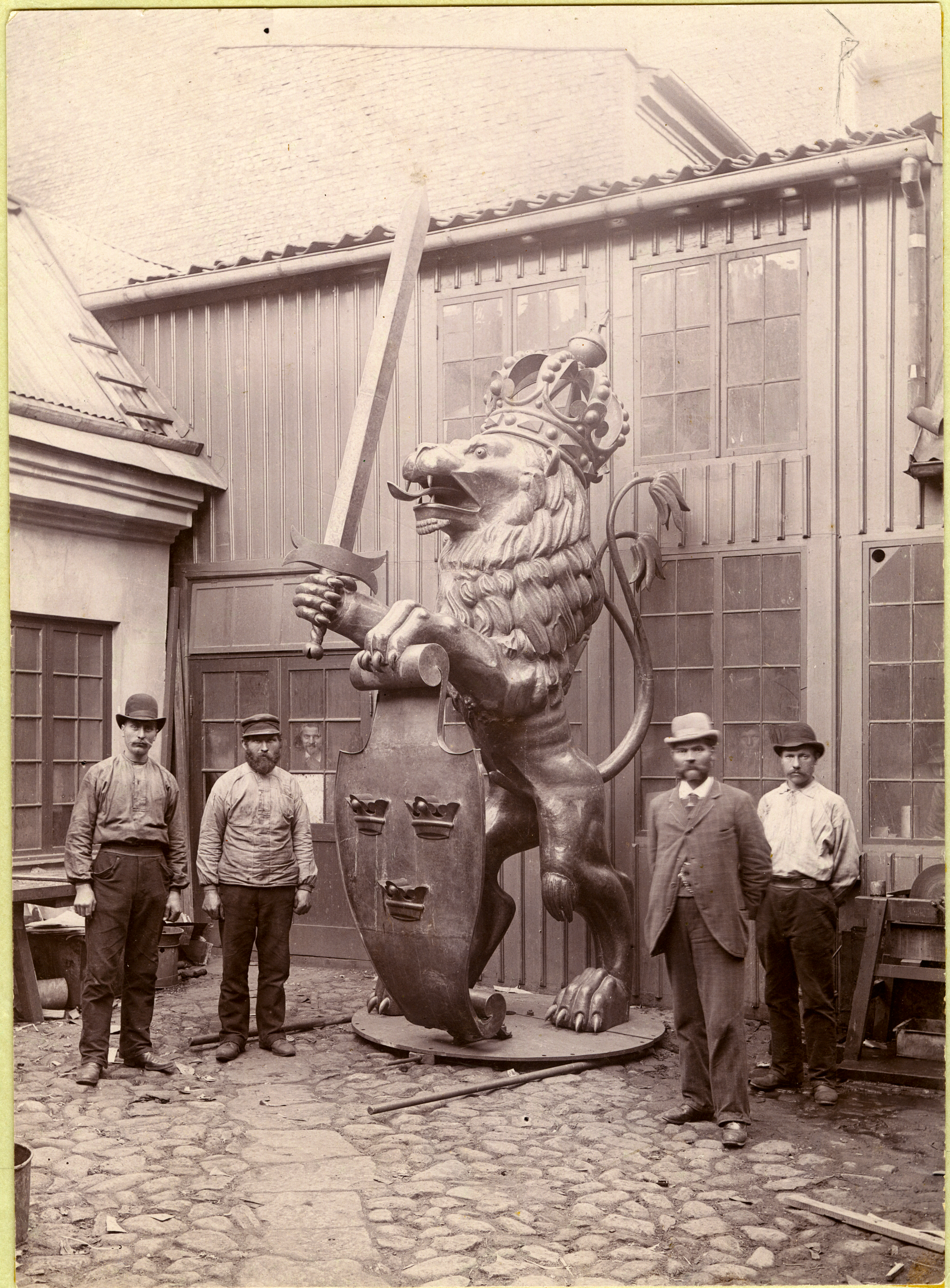
The new lion ornament, erected in 1893

The fortress was complete by 1692, when the finishing touch was applied in the shape of a lion ornament fashioned by the sculptor Marcus Jäger the Elder. The lion was depicted wearing a gilded crown, brandishing a sword and bearing a shield with the Swedish Three Crowns emblem, imitating the lion on the coat of arms of Gothenburg. At some point over the following two centuries the original ornament was removed for unknown reasons, and subsequently lost. However, after the roof of the building was destroyed by a fire in 1891, it was decided that once the damage had been fixed, a new lion should be made to adorn the tower again. The architect Eugen Thorburn designed the replacement ornament, which is four metres high and made of copper. The new lion was lifted into place atop Skansen Lejonet on October 6, 1893.

Skansen Lejonet is currently used as a venue for wedding banquets, conferences and private parties; the building is owned by a fraternal order, Götiska Förbundet, not to be confused with the literary society of the same name which was active in the early nineteenth century.

== See also ==
- Skansen Kronan
- New Älvsborg
- Fortifications of Gothenburg

== Sources ==
- Ahlmark, Lilly (1996). Skansarna Lejonet och Kronan i Göteborg: Lejonet och Kronan som de utformades och utfördes av Erik Dahlberg och Marcus Jäger. Årsbok / Stiftelsen Skansen Kronan, 1401-890X; 1. Göteborg: Stift. Skansen Kronan.
- "Skansen Lejonet". Götiska Förbundet.
