= History of Gothenburg =

Coat of arms of Gothenburg. The lion is symbolic of Götaland, and its shield bears the Three Crowns, the national emblem of Sweden.

The history of Gothenburg (Swedish: Göteborg) begins with the foundation of the city in 1621, although by that time people had already been living in the area for thousands of years, since the Neolithic Period, and moreover there had already been a series of earlier settlements on the lower Göta Älv, including one which also bore the name Gothenburg.

The Göta Älv has been of crucial importance throughout Swedish history as the country's only direct outlet to the North Sea, and thus to the wider world beyond the Baltic Sea. However, for many centuries the borders with Norwegian Bohuslän and Danish Halland ran right up to the river mouth, making Swedish settlements in the area extremely vulnerable to attack. The threat was significantly reduced by the conquests of both Bohuslän and Halland in the mid-seventeenth century, which gave Gothenburg the security to expand into Sweden's largest port and one of its main industrial centres.

== Prehistory ==
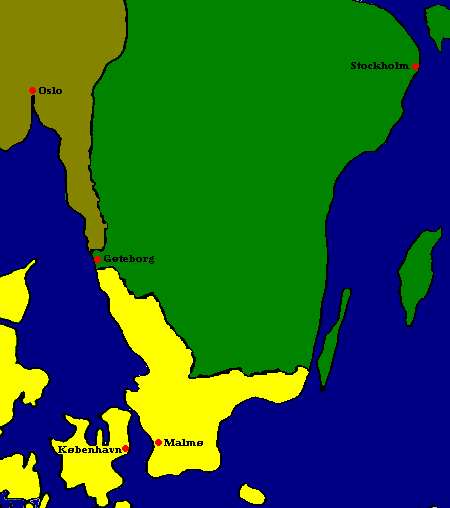
Scandinavian borders in the Middle Ages, with the future location of Gothenburg marked.

The southwestern coast of the Scandinavian Peninsula has been inhabited for several thousand years. During the Stone Age, there was a settlement at Sandarna, close to the mouth of the Göta Älv, which gives its name to the wider Sandarna Culture that flourished in southwest Scandinavia during the period 8400–6000 BC. There are eleven rock carvings in the Gothenburg area.

When the Kingdoms of Denmark, Norway and Sweden came into being in the late Viking Age, it appears that the entire western coastline of Scandinavia was claimed by Norway and Denmark, with the Göta Älv marking the frontier between the two kingdoms. However, during the High Middle Ages the Swedes seem to have conquered or otherwise taken control of a sliver of land on the south bank of the Göta Älv, as well as a foothold on the southern side of Hisingen Island, and thereby secured access to the North Sea for the first time. It is not clear exactly when this territorial acquisition occurred, but it was probably in the mid-thirteenth century.

== Predecessors of Gothenburg ==
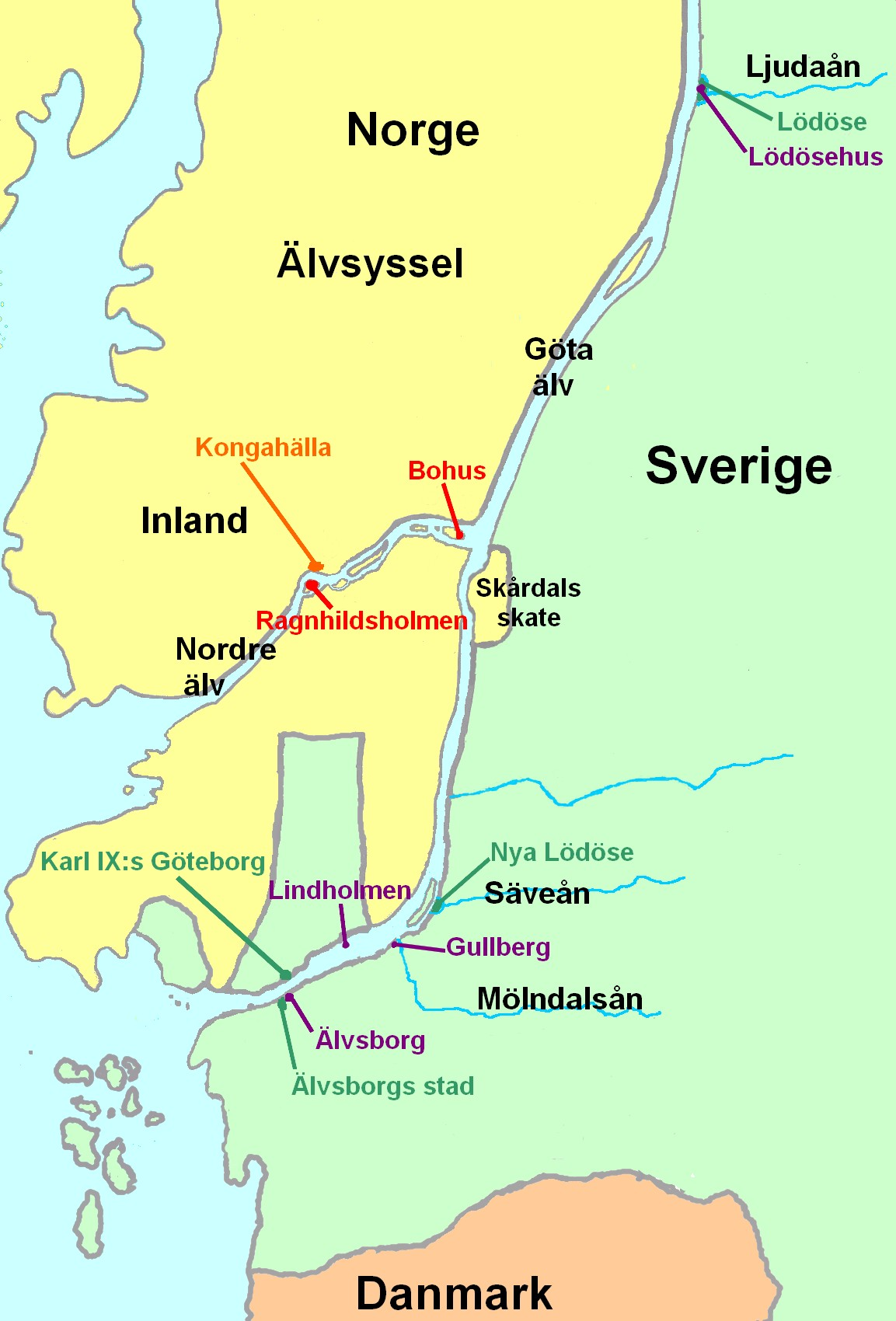
Map showing the various predecessors of Gothenburg (towns in green, fortresses in purple). The modern city of Gothenburg was founded in 1621 on the south bank of the Göta Älv, between Älvsborg and Gullberg.

=== Lödöse ===
The earliest predecessor of present-day Gothenburg was the town of Lödöse, located 40 kilometres upstream from the present city, on the east bank of the Göta Älv. The town first emerged in the late Viking Age and became a flourishing trade centre during the Middle Ages. One of the earliest attestations of the name Lödöse is from the 1260 will of a certain Margareta Persdotter, in which the town is referred to as 'claustro lydosiensi'.

Lödöse is also mentioned several times in the Icelandic sagas. Sturla Þórðarson's Hákonar saga Hákonarsonar incorporates a skaldic verse mentioning Lödöse in connection with a meeting at the town between the Norwegian prince Hákon the Younger and the Swedish ruler Birger Jarl in 1249. The verse ran, loosely translated:

The whole river was so beautiful to see,
As if one saw colours of shining gold,
When the famous king's men steered their ships to Lödöse.

Lödöse had a major disadvantage in that it was located upstream of the Norwegian fortress at Bohus, which meant that in times of war the garrison there could interfere with river traffic between Lödöse and the sea. This was not an issue for much of the Middle Ages, as wars between Sweden and Norway were generally infrequent and short during this period. However, from 1448 onward Sweden was embroiled in frequent wars with Denmark-Norway, which seriously hampered Lödöse's ability to trade with the outside world.

=== Nya Lödöse ===
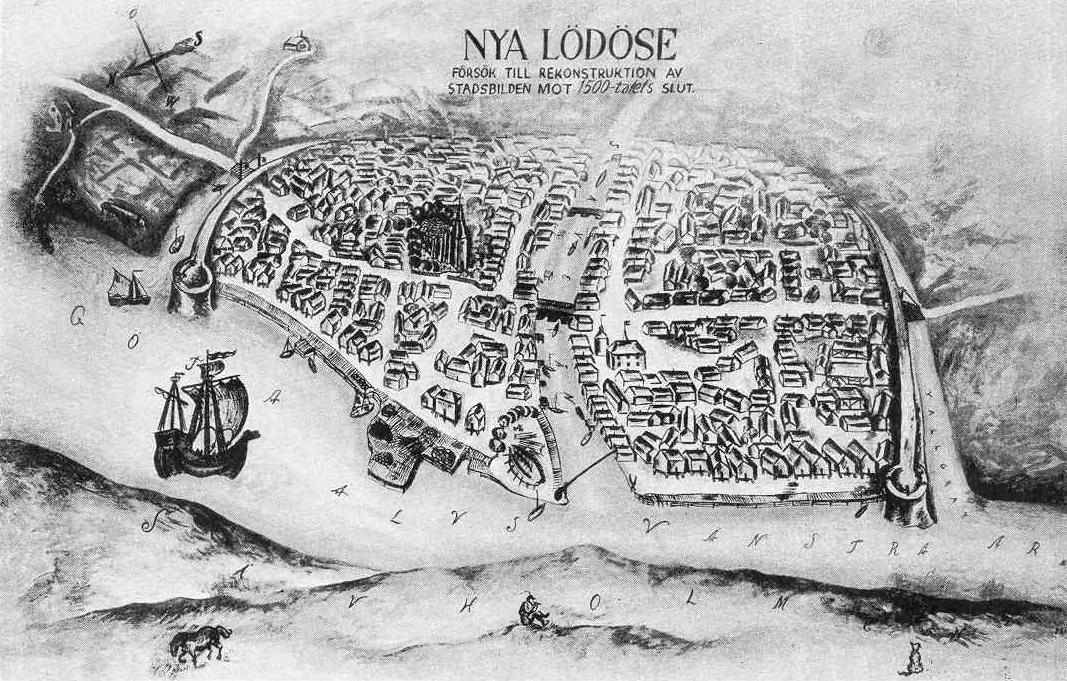
Nya Lödöse (New Lödöse) at the end of the 16th century.

In 1473, the Swedish regent Sten Sture the Elder tried to establish an alternative settlement downstream of Bohus, at the confluence of the Säveån river with the Göta Älv, to prevent the fortress from interfering with Swedish trade. Formally it was known as Göthaholm, but it soon came to be called "New Lödöse" (Swedish: Nya Lödöse), as many of the first inhabitants were former citizens of (Old) Lödöse.

However, the new location (in what is now the Gamlestaden district of eastern Gothenburg) proved to be vulnerable to Danish-Norwegian raids, and Nya Lödöse was repeatedly sacked, notably in December 1507 by Henrik Krummedige.

=== Älvsborg Town ===
Älvsborg Castle had originally been built in the 1360s at the mouth of the Göta Älv.

In November 1545, King Gustav I decided to relocate Nya Lödöse to a site directly adjacent to the castle so that the town could benefit from its protection. The relocation of the townspeople was effected in summer 1547, and on 30 July of the same year the new town is attested in documents for the first time, with the name "Älvsborg Town" (Swedish: Älvsborgs Stad).

However, in 1563, at the outbreak of the Northern Seven Years War, a Danish army attacked Älvsborg, captured the castle and razed Älvsborg Town.

=== The Gothenburg of Charles IX ===
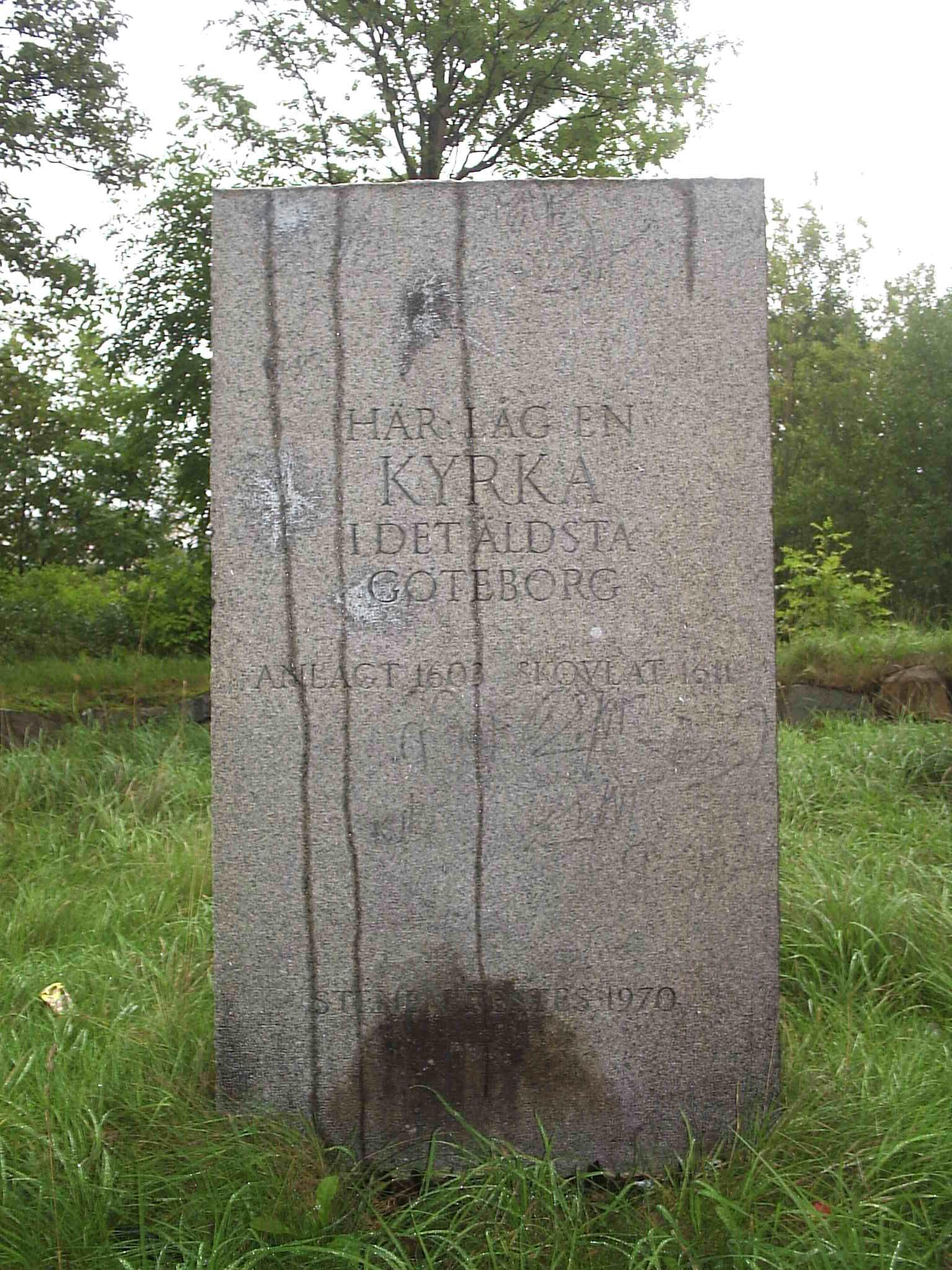
Stone marking the site of the church in the Gothenburg of Charles IX, in what is now Färjenäs Park.

In 1607 Gustav's son, King Charles IX, founded a new settlement directly across the Göta Älv from Älvsborg, on the south side of the island of Hisingen, in what is now the district of Färjenäs. It was named Göteborg (Gothenburg), and was the first settlement to bear this name.

Charles's Gothenburg was almost wholly inhabited by Dutch merchants and immigrants, and Dutch was the official language within the town. The settlers were attracted to Sweden with the promise of free trade and freedom of religion. They enjoyed privileges such as 20 years of tax exemption and lowered customs rates. In return, Sweden and the west coast could benefit of the skills and trade connections of the Dutch.

However, Gothenburg proved to be just as vulnerable to Danish-Norwegian attacks as its predecessors at Nya Lödöse and Älvsborg Town, indeed arguably even more so, as part of Hisingen (Hisings skipreide) was in fact Norwegian territory at this time. Soon after the outbreak of the Kalmar War, on 12 June 1611, the town was attacked and burnt by a Danish-Norwegian force.

== Foundation of Gothenburg ==
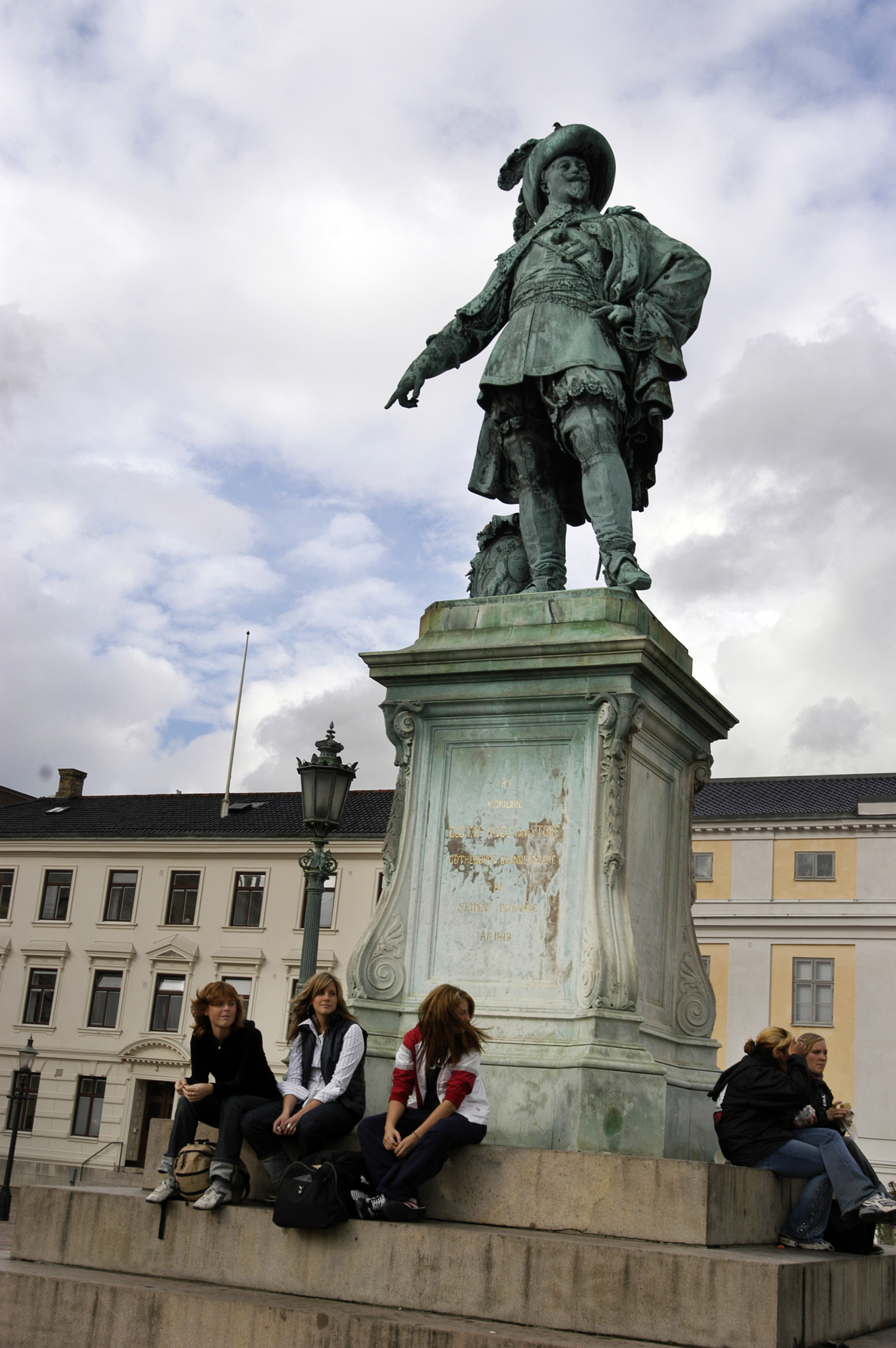
Statue of Gustavus Adolphus in Gustav Adolfs Torg, the central square of Gothenburg. The king is depicted in the act of making his Här skall staden ligga! declaration.

In 1621, King Gustav II Adolf, the son and successor of Charles IX, decided to make yet another attempt at founding a city on the Göta Älv. According to legend, the king was searching for a suitable location when suddenly a dove fleeing from an eagle landed at his feet, seeking shelter. Gustav took this as a sign from God and declared, Här skall staden ligga! ('Here shall the city lie!'). In order to ensure the new settlement did not suffer the same fate as its predecessors, it was provided with a substantial network of fortifications, later augmented by the twin fortresses of Skansen Kronan and Skansen Lejonet.

As at Charles IX's Gothenburg, the majority of the initial inhabitants of Gustav Adolf's Gothenburg were immigrants, and above all from the Dutch Republic. Indeed, the initial city council comprised ten Dutchmen, seven Swedes and one Scot. Dutch builders were contracted to plan the new city and construct its fortifications, in part because of their expertise in building on marshland. To drain the swampy ground and provide access for shipping, Gothenburg was given a network of canals, akin to those of Dutch cities like Amsterdam, and indeed it appears the plans for the canal network were modelled on those used for the recent Dutch colonial settlement of Batavia (modern Jakarta, Indonesia). The Dutch influence over Gothenburg in its early decades was so strong that it was sometimes regarded as a Dutch colony on Swedish soil; for example one contemporary writer described it as, Gotheburg ab Hollandis aliisque Belgis incolitur ('Gothenburg, inhabited by Hollanders and other Belgians')

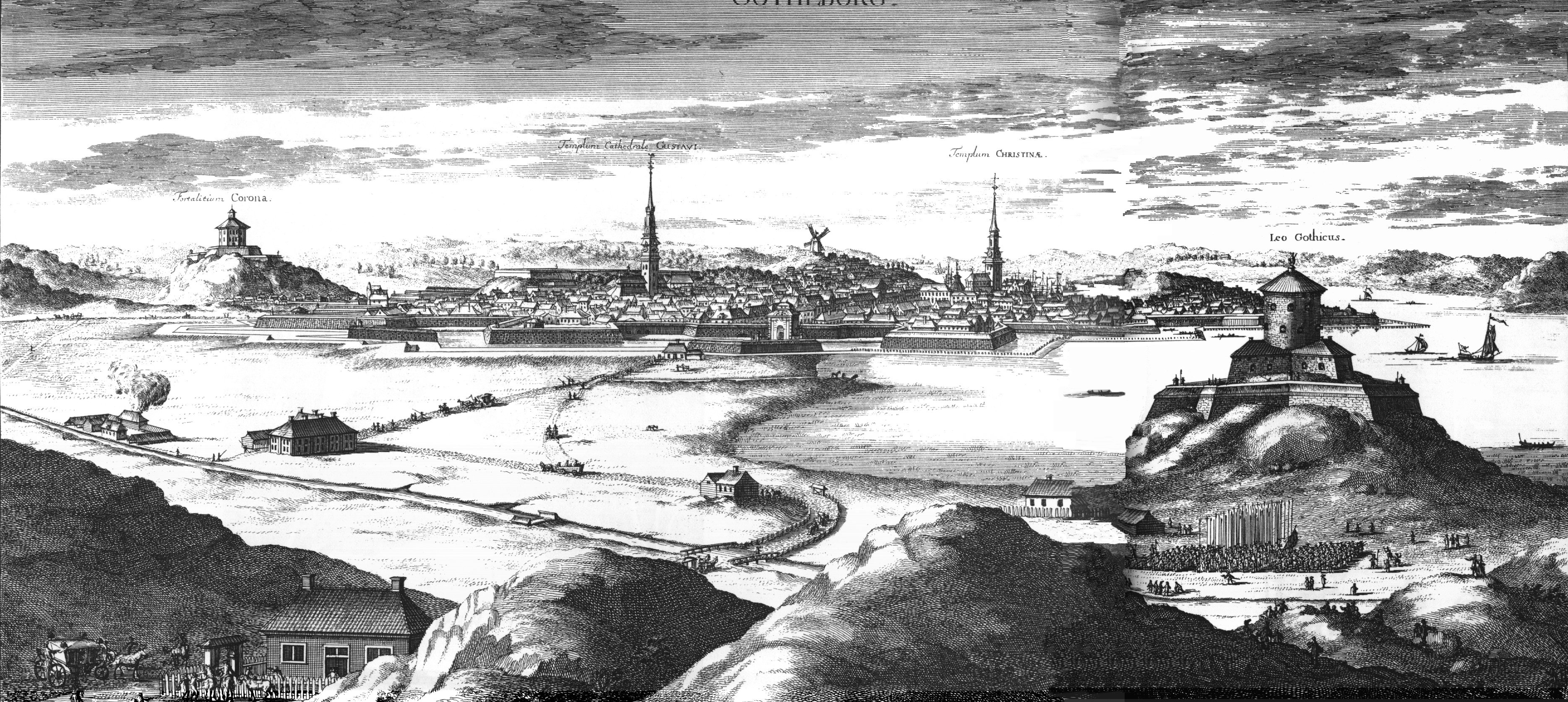
Gothenburg in the mid-seventeenth century, as depicted in Erik Dahlbergh's Suecia Antiqua et Hodierna. In the foreground is Skansen Lejonet.

Over time, however, more and more native Swedes started to move to the city, and they soon represented a majority of the population. This demographic shift is reflected by the fact that the city council became homogeneously Swedish after 1652, when the last Dutch councillor died.

During these first few decades of its existence, Gothenburg also acquired a fire brigade, which, having been founded in July 1639, is generally reckoned to be the oldest fire brigade in Sweden.

Under the Treaty of Roskilde (1658), Denmark–Norway ceded the Danish province of Halland and the Norwegian province of Bohuslän to Sweden, thereby moving the frontiers with both Denmark and Norway away from the Göta Älv and leaving Gothenburg in a much less exposed position. The city was subsequently able to grow into an important port, in part due to the fact that it was one of only two ports on the Swedish west coast (the other being Marstrand), which was granted the right to trade with merchants from other countries.

== Early modern Gothenburg ==
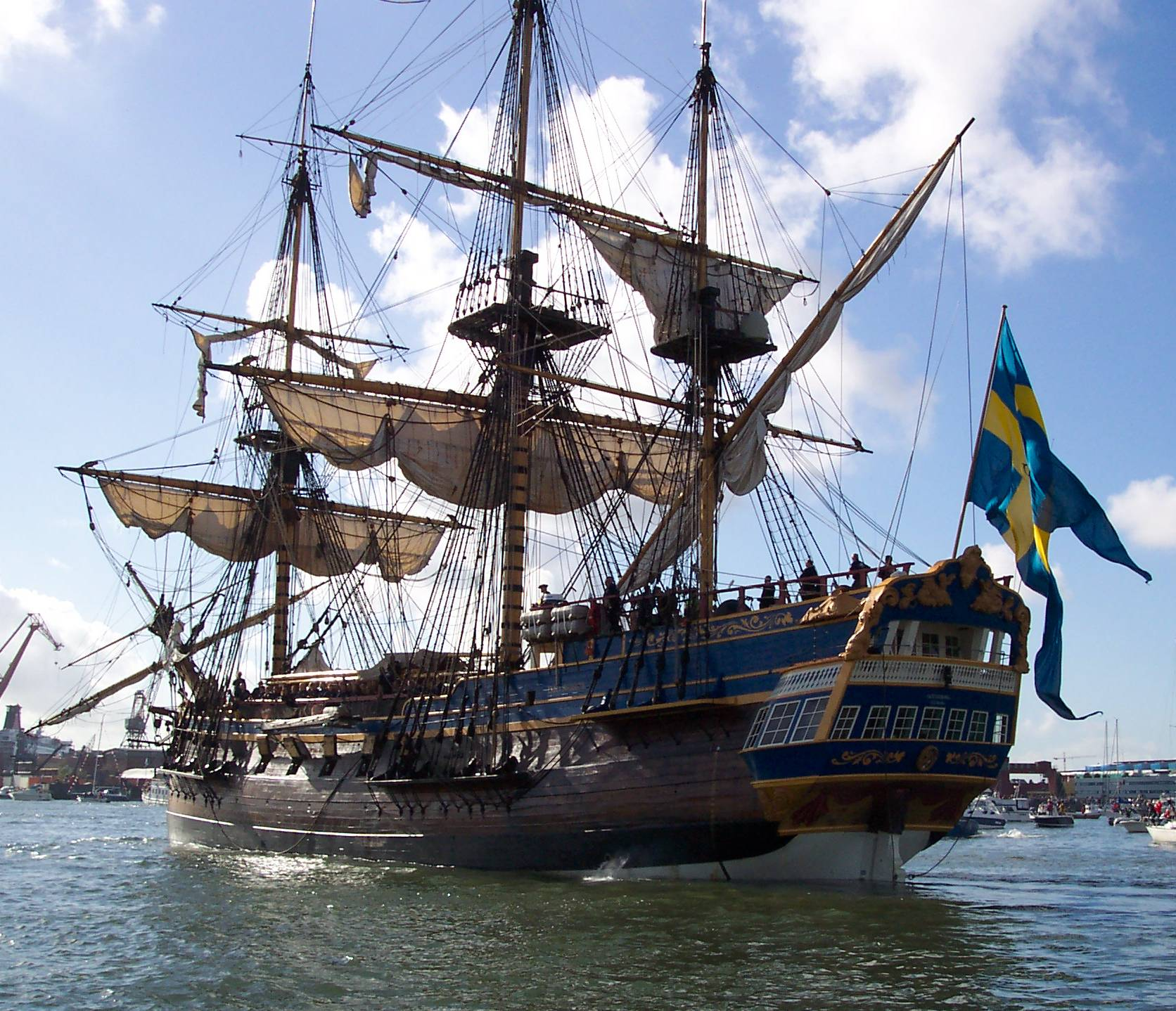
The Götheborg replica under sail on the Göta Älv, 2005.

During the Great Northern War, Gothenburg became the base for privateers attacking Danish-Norwegian shipping, the most famous of these being Lars Gathenhielm, known as Lasse I Gatan. The Danish-Norwegians had their own naval hero in the form of the charismatic Norwegian captain Peder Tordenskjold, who attacked Gothenburg and the network of fortresses surrounding it on several occasions during the years 1717-9,

At the beginning of the eighteenth century, fishing was Gothenburg's primary industry, but over the course of the next few decades it came to be eclipsed by trade. In 1731 the Swedish East India Company was founded in Gothenburg, and the city flourished due to its highly profitable commercial expeditions to Asian countries. One of the Company's ships was the Götheborg, which was wrecked in the Gothenburg Archipelago in 1745, on its return from a voyage to China. A replica of the Götheborg was built in 1995–2005 and is now a major tourist attraction.

The harbour developed into Sweden's main harbour for trade towards the west, and was the main port of departure for Swedish emigrants to North America. This history is reflected by the foundation of the House of the Emigrants (Emigranternas Hus) museum in the city in 2004. The impact of Gothenburg as a main port of embarkation for Swedish emigrants is reflected by Gothenburg, Nebraska, a small Swedish settlement in the United States.

== Modern Gothenburg ==
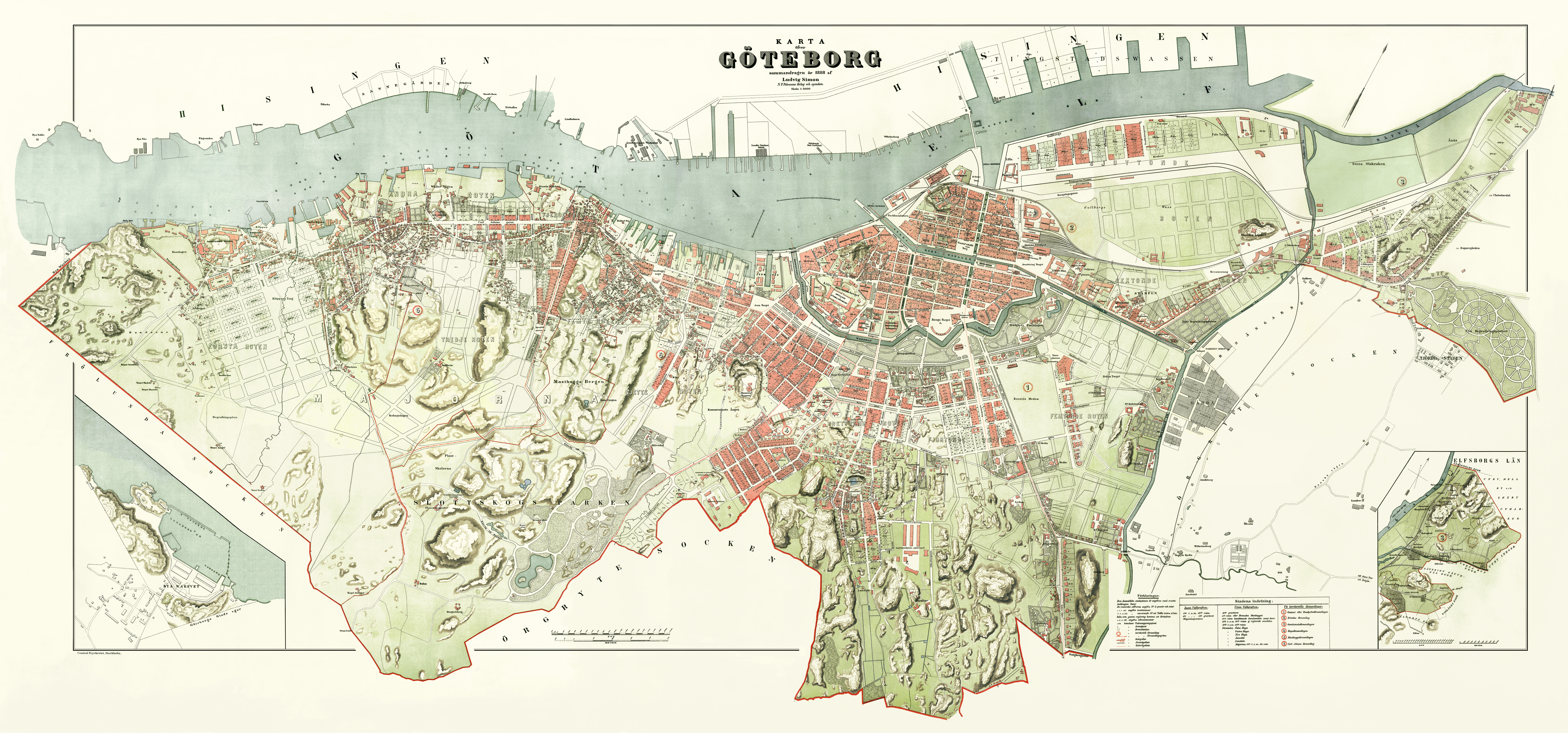
1888 map of Gothenburg

With the 19th century, Gothenburg evolved into a modern industrial city that continued on into the 20th century. The population increased tenfold in the century, from 13,000 (1800) to 130,000 (1900). In the 20th century, major companies that developed included SKF (est. 1907) and Volvo (est. 1926).

In more recent years however, the industrial section has faced a recession, which has spurred the development of new sectors such as increased merchandising, tourism and cultural and educational institutions.

The city acquired a mass transit system in 1902, in the form of a network of electric trams. Gothenburg was one of only two Swedish cities (the other being Norrköping) to retain its trams after the switch to driving on the right in 1967, and as such the city has become particularly associated with this form of public transport in the Swedish imagination, even though several other cities have created new tram networks in the decades since.

In June 2001, major protests occurred in the city during the EU summit and the visit by US president George W. Bush.

== See also ==
- Timeline of Gothenburg
- Lödöse
- Old Älvsborg
- Battles at Göta Älv
- Swedish East India Company
