= Skansen Kronan =

Redoubt on the hill Risåsberget in Sweden

The Crown Sconce
- Skansen Kronan
- Gothenburg in Sweden
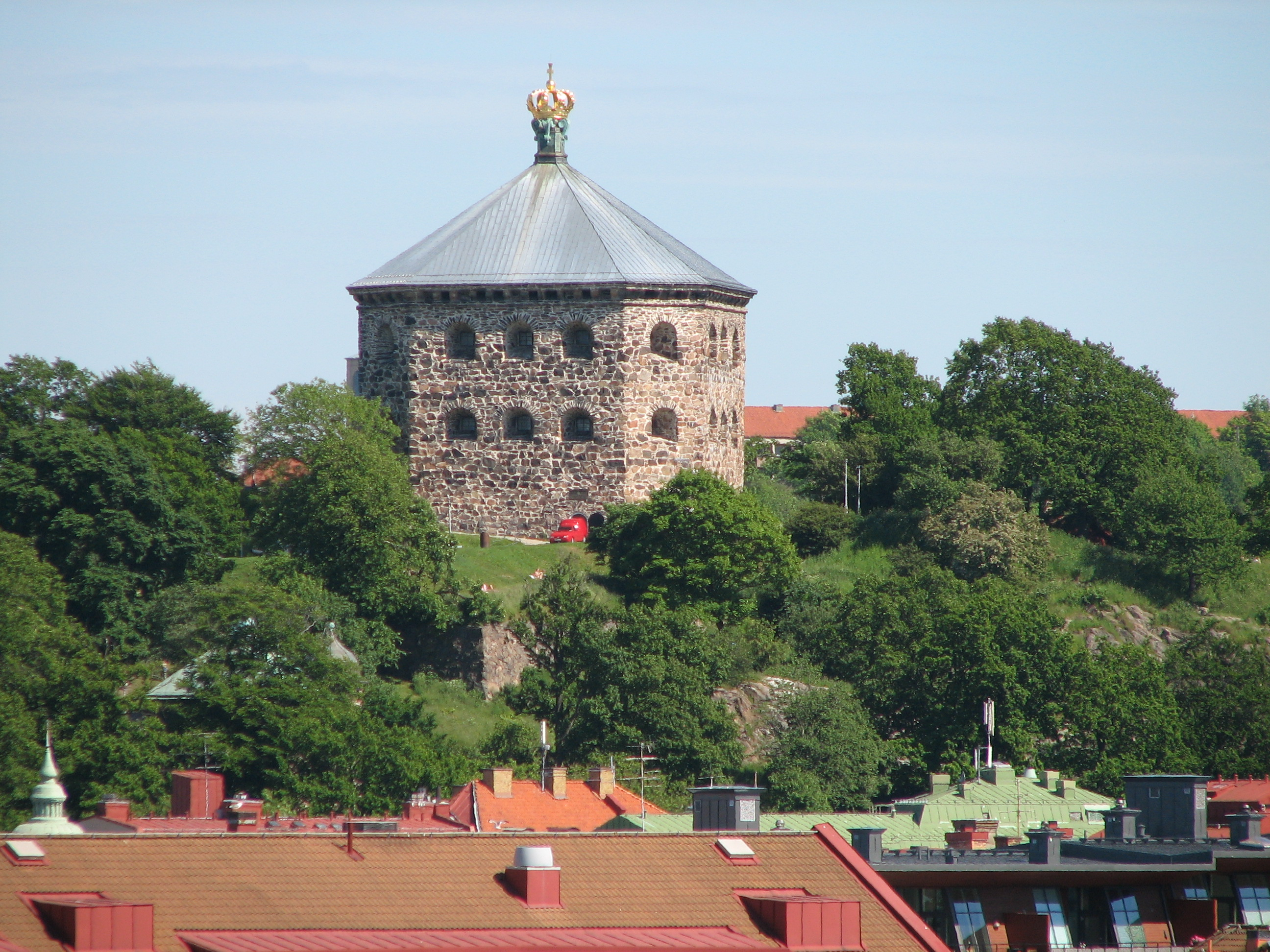
- Skansen Kronan

Site information
- Type: Sconce
- Owner: Skansen Kronan
- Open to the public: Yes
- Website: skansenkronan.se

Location
- Coordinates: 57°41′48″N 11°57′17″E

Site history
- Built: 1687-1700; 326 years ago
- Built by: Kingdom of Sweden
- In use: 1698-1904
- Materials: Granite, gneiss, diabase

Skansen Kronan ("the Crown Sconce") is a redoubt on the hill Risåsberget, in the Haga district of Gothenburg, Sweden.

The fortress and its twin, Skansen Lejonet, were built to protect the city of Gothenburg against possible Danish attack, and thus had a similar purpose to the sea fort of New Älvsborg, which was built around the same time.

== History ==
The city of Gothenburg was founded in 1621. The new settlement was equipped with an impressive network of fortifications, but military engineers were concerned by the fact that the city was overlooked by two hills, the Gullberg and the Risåsberg, and so it was decided to construct forts on both hilltops in order to prevent potential attackers from siting artillery there. The two forts were designed by Erik Dahlbergh, with the one on the Risåsberg being named Skansen Kronan and the one on the Gullberg being named Skansen Lejonet.

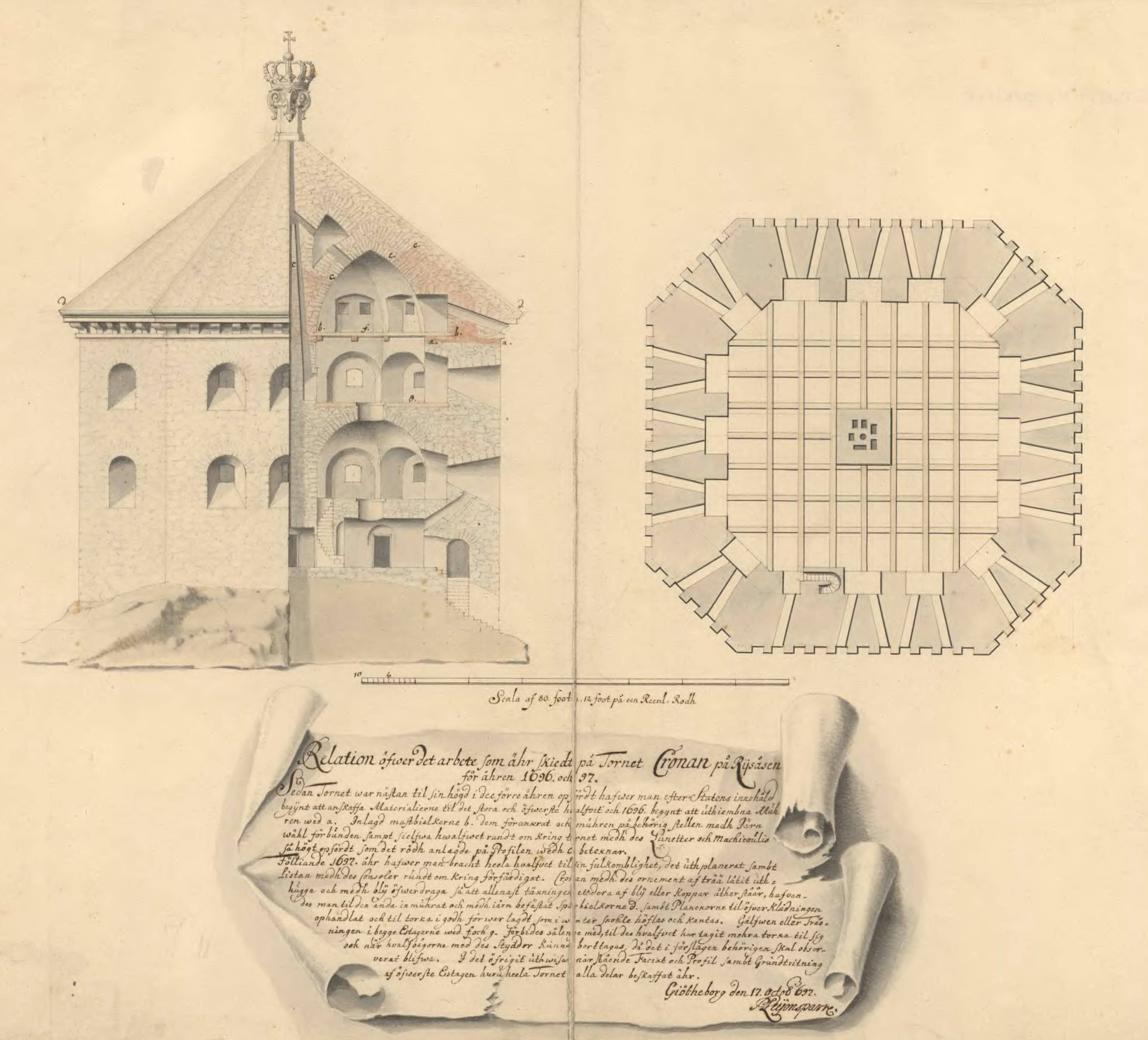
Plan of Skansen Kronan marking the parts of the fortress (in red) completed 1697-8.

Work began on Skansen Kronan in 1687, and the fort was officially commissioned in 1698 and equipped with 23 guns, though the roof was not actually completed until 1700. It has 4-5 metre thick walls made of granite, gneiss and diabase. Skansen Kronan was never attacked, and the cannons were never fired in anger.

Around the year 1900 it was decided to turn the fortress into a military museum, which opened on 23 November 1904. The museum closed in September 2004, and its collections were transferred to the Museum of Gothenburg.

Skansen Kronan was recognised as a listed building in 1935.

At the time of its construction, Skansen Kronan was located outside the city walls, but the hill was later swallowed up by urban sprawl, becoming part of Haga in west-central Gothenburg. Today Skansen Kronan is privately owned and used as a venue for conferences and private parties.

== See also ==
- Skansen Lejonet
- New Älvsborg
- Fortifications of Gothenburg

== Other sources ==
- Ahlmark, Lilly (1996). Skansarna Lejonet och Kronan i Göteborg: Lejonet och Kronan som de utformades och utfördes av Erik Dahlberg och Marcus Jäger. Årsbok / Stiftelsen Skansen Kronan, 1401-890X; 1. Göteborg: Stift. Skansen Kronan.
- Mattsson, Britt-Marie (1992) Parkernas Göteborg (Göteborg: AB Långedrag, Tryckeri AB Framåt) ISBN 91-630-1016-X
- Rhedin, Per (1996) Med hammare, sax och tång: En liten historik om plåtslageriet i Göteborg, (utgiven av Göteborgs Bleck- & Plåtslagaremästareförening) ISBN 91-630-4459-5
- Schånberg, Sven; Stig Allan Agroth (1989) Vid Skansbergets fot : Hagastudier i bild och ord (Göteborg) ISBN 91-85786-21-7
