= Kingsport (disambiguation) =

Kingsport is a city in the U.S. state of Tennessee. "Kingsport" may also refer to:

- Kingsport–Bristol–Bristol, Tennessee-Virginia Metropolitan Statistical Area, a U.S. Metropolitan Statistical Area
- Kingsport Mets, a minor league baseball team based in Kingsport, Tennessee
- Kingsport, Nova Scotia, a village in Nova Scotia
- USNS Kingsport (T-AG 164), a US Navy ship
- Kingsport (Lovecraft), a fictional town in the writings of H. P. Lovecraft

== See also ==
- Kungsporten ("King's port"), one of the city gates in the Fortifications of Gothenburg
