= Willem Swidde =

Dutch draughtsperson and engraver

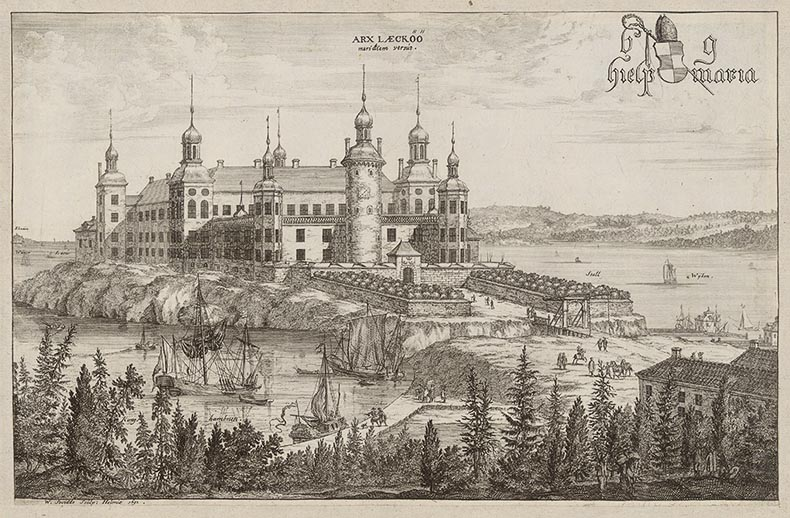
Läckö Castle, engraving by Willem Swidde in Suecia Antiqua et Hodierna

Willem Swidde (c. 1660 in Amsterdam – 1697 in Stockholm) was a Dutch draughtsman and engraver, active in Sweden.

Willem Swidde's life is not well documented. He was recruited by Erik Dahlbergh to come to Sweden to work with illustrating topographical and historical books. He came to Stockholm in 1688. His first commission was to make illustrations for a history of Charles X Gustav of Sweden, De Rebus a Carlo Gustavo Sveciae Regis, written by Samuel Pufendorf. Swidde made 18 of the 123 plates for the book. His next, main and final commission, which kept him occupied for the rest of his life, was the engraving of the illustrations for the grandly projected book Suecia Antiqua et Hodierna, a topographical work in the tradition of Matthäus Merian, intended to glorify Sweden. Swidde was one of a team of engravers, making 76 of the book's plates. He worked from drawings made by Dahlbergh, often correcting and bettering the motifs in cooperation with Dahlbergh. He died in Stockholm in 1697.
