= Nicolas Perelle =

French painter and engraver (1631–1695)

Gabriel Perelle
- Wayfarers in a forest. Engraving by Nicolas Perelle, Amsterdam, Rijksmuseum
- Born: 14 December 1631; Paris, Kingdom of France
- Died: 1692 (aged 60–61); Paris, Kingdom of France
- Occupations: Painter; Engraver
- Movement: Baroque

Nicolas Perelle (14 December 1631 – 1692) was a French Baroque painter and engraver.

== Biography ==
Nicolas Perelle was born in Paris on 14 December 1631. He was the son of Gabriel Perelle and the brother of Adam Perelle. He apprenticed with his father and around 1648 joined the workshop of Simon Vouet. Between 1650 and 1655 he contributed several plates to Beaulieu's Les Glorieuses Conquêtes de Louis le Grand; several views of cities and fortifications and a series of Bacchanalia in the style of Vouet have also been attributed to him.

In 1668, Perelle met Erik Dahlbergh, who invited him to contribute illustrations to the collection of prints De rebus a Carolo Gustavo gestis. For this publication, he produced seventeen engravings of plans and battles. He later contributed 19 copperplate engravings depicting views and buildings to Dahlbergh’s Suecia Antiqua et Hodierna. Several of Perelle's engravings are held in the collections of the Nationalmuseum in Stockholm.

== Gallery ==
View of the Porte Saint-Bernard in Paris, Musée Carnavalet, Paris

Ancient Ruin, Rijksmuseum, Amsterdam

View of the Colosseum, Rijksmuseum, Amsterdam

View of the Theatre of Marcellus, Rijksmuseum, Amsterdam

Apollo granting his chariot to Phaethon. Engraving by Perelle after a painting by Poussin, British Museum, London

== Bibliography ==
- Meyer, Véronique (2003). "Pérelle family". Grove Art Online. Oxford: Oxford University Press. doi:10.1093/gao/9781884446054.article.T066320.
