= Gabriel Perelle =

French draughtsman and copper engraver

- The garden of the Hôtel d'Aumont in Paris. Engraving by Perelle
- Born: 7 March 1604; Vernon, Eure, Kingdom of France
- Died: 6 June 1677 (aged 73); Paris, Kingdom of France
- Occupations: Draftsman; Printmaker
- Movement: Baroque

Gabriel Perelle (7 March 1604 – 6 June 1677) was a French draftsman and printmaker of topographic views and landscapes.

== Biography ==
Gabriel Perelle was born in Vernon, Eure, on 7 March 1604. A pupil of Simon Vouet, he specialized in classical landscapes not dissimilar to those of Francisque Millet, although more obviously decorative. He founded an etching workshop, and his sons Nicolas and Adam assisted him. In 1665, Louis XIV appointed him Directeur des Plans et des Cartes du Cabinet du Roi.

Perelle was also a pupil of Daniel Rabel and produced several hundred engravings both from his own drawings and from those of other artists such as Israel Silvestre, Paul Bril, Jacques Callot, Michel Corneille the Elder, Jan Asselijn, Jacques Fouquières, Cornelis Poelenburg, and Sébastien Pontault de Beaulieu. These engravings in the etching and intaglio mainly depict landscapes of the Paris region, including views of castles, where he introduced the variety by adding ruins and various accessories.
