= Haga, Gothenburg =

Urban district in Sweden

Coordinates: 57°41′55″N 11°57′23″E

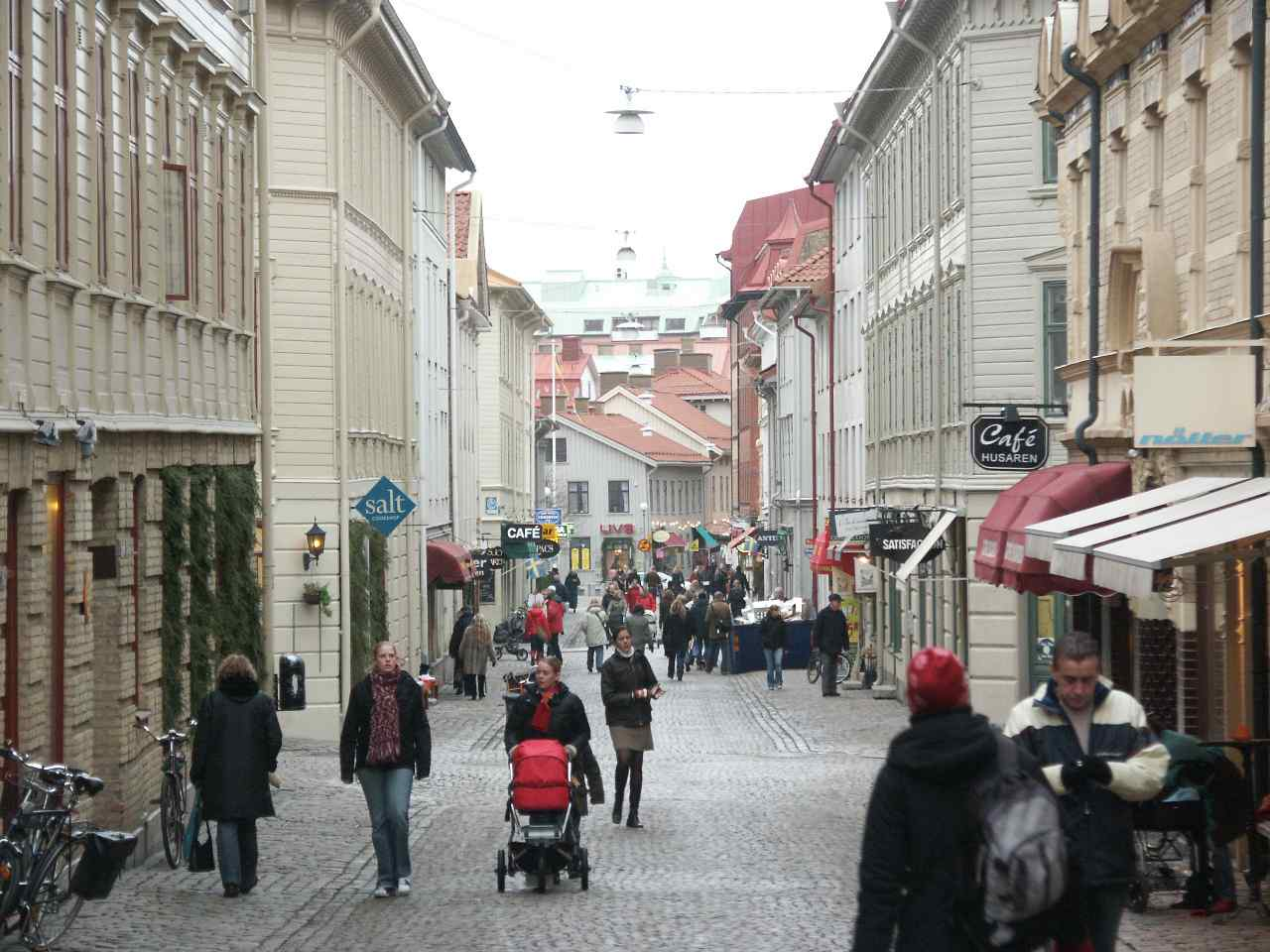
The pedestrian street Haga Nygata in Haga, Gothenburg

Haga is a city district in Gothenburg, Sweden, renowned for its picturesque wooden houses, 19th century-atmosphere and cafés. Originally a working class suburb of the city with a rather bad reputation, it was gradually transformed into a popular visiting place for tourists and Gothenburgers. A major renovation of the area was made in the 1980s, houses were either renovated or torn down and replaced by post-modernistic replicas.

Today, Haga has a population of about 4,000 people (4,093 at 2006), a much smaller population compared to 15,000 people one hundred years ago – an indication of the gentrification the district has gone through.

Haga is also a parish with the same borders as the city district. It is, areawise, the smallest parish in Sweden.

== History ==
The district was first established in the mid-17th century by Queen Kristina, making it Gothenburg's first suburb. Originally, it was decreed that, since the district was outside the city walls, the area could be demolished in the event that the land was needed by the crown or in case of a threatening siege. In the 1690s, this rule was applied and 34 houses of the district were demolished in order to build a covered causeway, caponier, from the city walls to the fortress of Skansen Crown.

It was not until the 1840s that new industries were established in Gothenburg, which led to an influx of workers into Haga, creating the first worker's district in the area. This led to a housing shortage during the 1870s and the establishment of additional worker's districts to accommodate the rapid growth of the city. In the 1920s, after extensive expansion of the district, the population of the area began a decline. Many public works in the area were closed and it became a primarily residential area.

A redevelopment plan drawn up in 1962 for Gothenburg, which again included the demolition of buildings in the district. This led to the founding of the Haga Group, in 1970, which strove to preserve the original architecture of the area. Between 1973 and 1977, demolition work decreased due to the pressure of the locals. This also moved the authorities to help restore some of the buildings which were already in disrepair.

== In popular culture ==
Haga is the main setting of the television sitcom Albert & Herbert. The series, which ran from 1974 to 1982, is about two scrap-dealers who live in a dilapidated house in the district.
