= Adam Perelle =

French draughtsman and copper engraver

Adam Pérelle
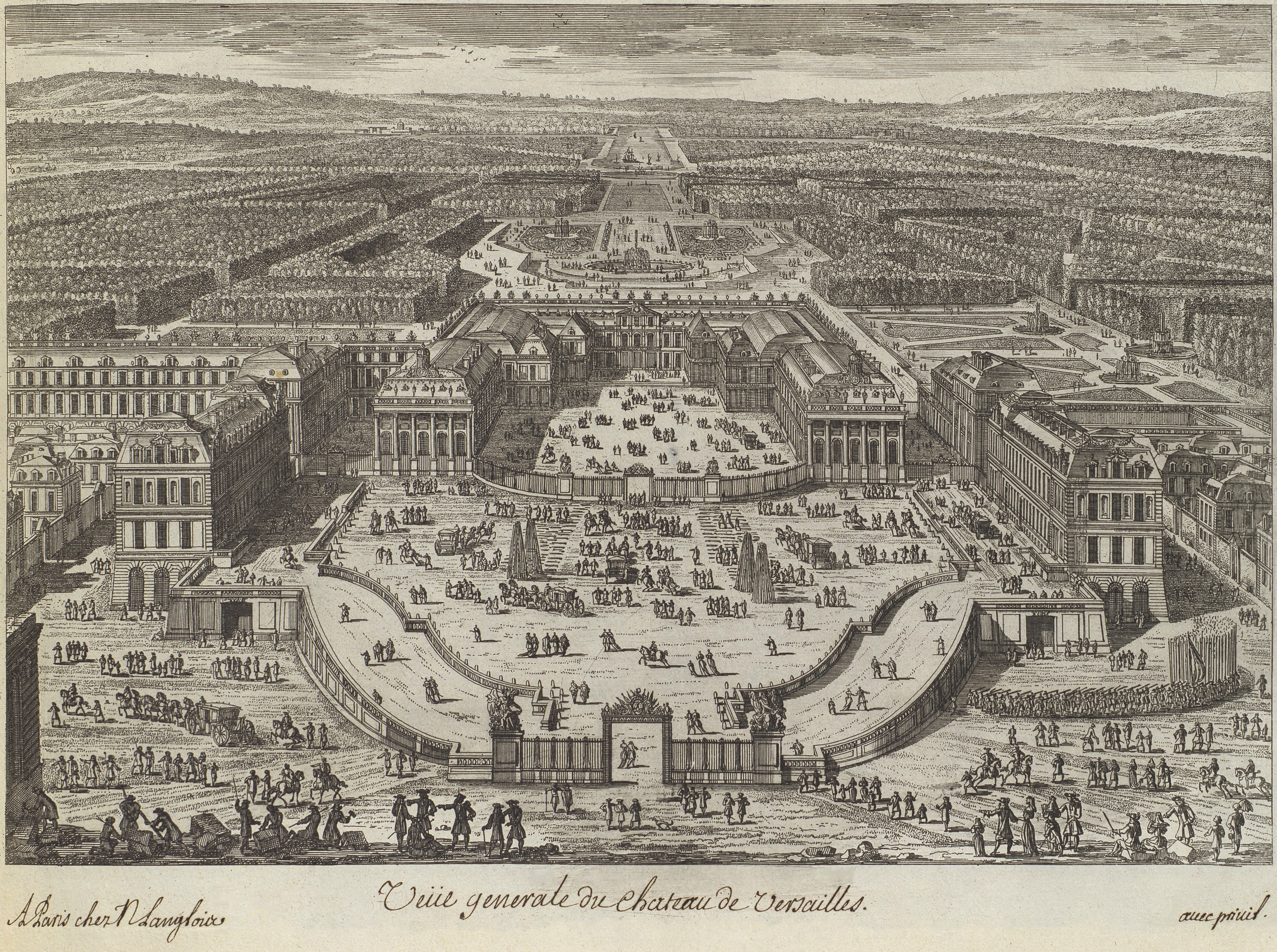
- View of Versailles, c. 1680
- Born: 8 October 1640; Paris, Kingdom of France
- Died: 23 March 1695 (aged 54–55); Paris, Kingdom of France
- Education: Gabriel Perelle
- Known for: Painting; Engraving
- Movement: Baroque

Adam Pérelle (8 October 1640 – 23 March 1695) was a French artist and writer.

== Biography ==
Adam Perelle was born in Paris on 8 October 1640. He was the son of Gabriel Pérelle and the younger brother of Nicolas Perelle. Adam Perelle was a pupil of his father and subsequently his assistant. Like his brother, he produced copperplate engravings depicting landscapes and monuments. He obtained the title of engraver of the King and taught drawing and painting in high society. One of his pupils was Louis III, Prince of Condé – a grandson of the 4th Prince of Condé, Louis II de Bourbon (1621–1686), known as "le Grand Condé".

In 1667, he signed a contract with Erik Dahlbergh to create illustrations for the celebratory work De rebus a Carolo Gustavo Sueciae rege gestis, authored by Samuel von Pufendorf, as well as for Dahlbergh’s own work, Suecia Antiqua et Hodierna. For these two projects, he produced 13 plates depicting various battles, along with 32 images of landscapes and buildings.

== Gallery ==
Landscape with Travellers, Metropolitan Museum of Art, New York

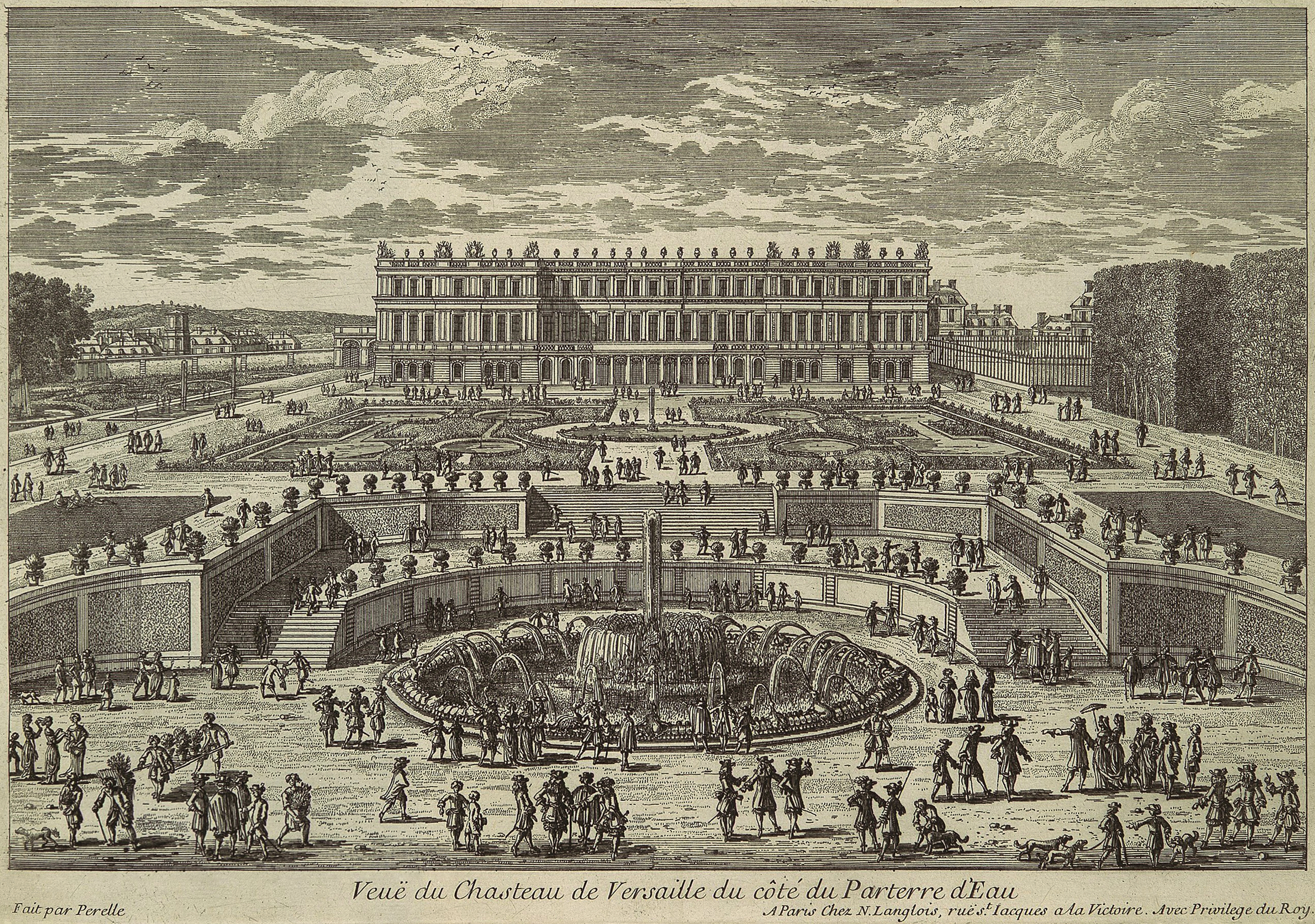
View of Versailles, garden Façade, Metropolitan Museum of Art, New York

View of Porte Saint-Bernard, Paris, Bibliothèque nationale de France, Paris

Perspective view of Château Bassecourt, Metropolitan Museum of Art, New York
