= Fortifications of Gothenburg =

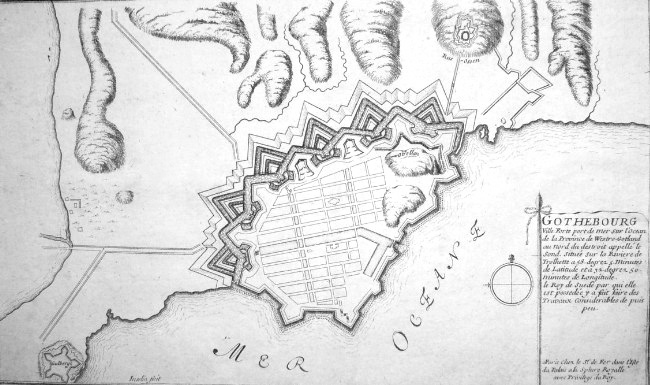
Lithography of Gothenburg, 1705 (south is up); the bastions from right to left are: Carolus XI Rex, Carolus Gustavus Rex, Christina Regina, Carolus Dux, John Dux, Gustavus Magnus, Carolus Rex IX, John Rex and Gustavus Primus

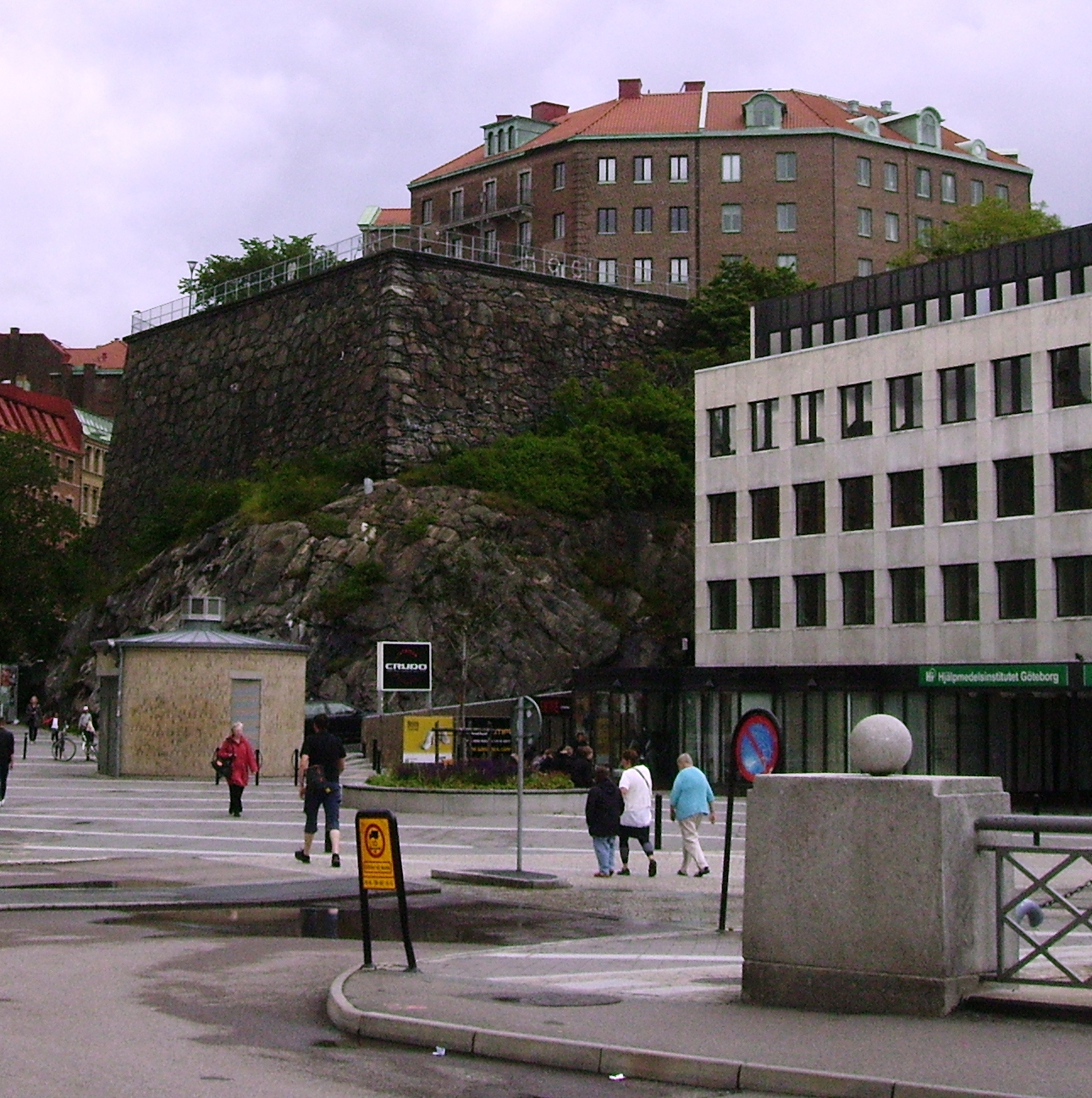
Carolus XI Rex Bastion (also referred to as Hållgårdsbastionen) at Rosenlund, Gothenburg

Fortifications of Gothenburg (Swedish: Göteborgs befästningar) were initially embankments along the newly dug city moat (Vallgraven) in Gothenburg, Sweden. They were built to defend Gothenburg which was Sweden's only direct access to the North Sea and Atlantic Ocean.

== History ==
Gothenburg was founded in 1621 at the direction of King Gustav II Adolf. Construction beginning in 1624 under the leadership of engineers, Captain Johan Schultz (Schouten) and Johan Jacobssen Kuyl (Kuhl), following a design by chief engineer Johan Rodenburg. The works were based upon the well-established Dutch school of fortification.

When military engineer Erik Dahlberg (1625–1703) took responsibility for Sweden's fortifications in 1676 he implemented the wishes of King Karl XI for modern bastions of high wall construction. The ramparts were lined with walls of blasted rock and the fortified town of Gothenburg developed with 13 polygonal bastions and accompanying moat, ravelins and 3 city gates (Kungsporten; Nya porten, later renamed Drottningporten; and Karlsporten/Hållgårdsporten).

Gothenburg was growing rapidly by the end of the 1700s while the fortifications had suffered from poor maintenance. Demolition of the fortifications began in 1807, and was completed within ten years. The only surviving piece of bastion is Carolus XI Rex (named after King Charles XI of Sweden), on the side of the Lilla Otterhällan hill.

== See also ==
- History of Gothenburg
- Skansen Kronan
- Skansen Lejonet

== Other sources ==
- Fästningen Göteborg : samlingar till stadens arkeologi. Mölndal: Avdelningen för arkeologiska undersökningar (Riksantikvarieämbetet. 2006) ISBN 91-7209-418-4
