= SS Perelle =

A number of steamships were named Perelle, including:

- SS Perelle (1929), a Guernsey coaster in service 1929–42
- SS Perelle (1945), a Guernsey coaster in service 1954–62
