= Sébastien Pontault de Beaulieu =

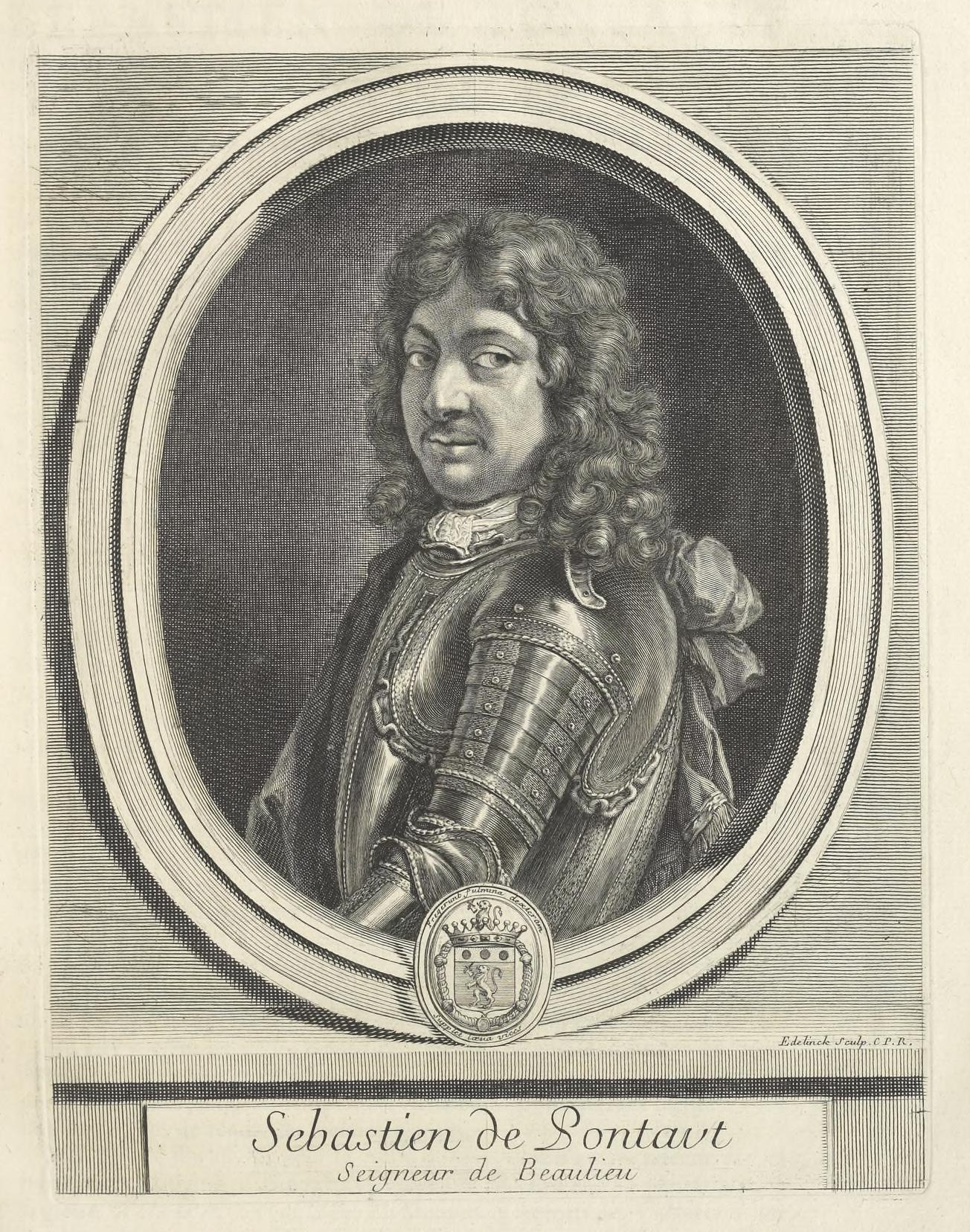
Portrait of Sébastien de Pontault by Gérard Edelinck

Sébastien Pontault de Beaulieu (1612–1674) was a French engineer, who is considered to be the first military topographer, or rather the inventor of that art, during the reign of Louis XIV.

== Biography ==
Pontault went into the army at the age of fifteen, and behaved with so much spirit at the siege of Rochelle, that the king gave him the post of commissary of artillery, even though he was so young. He was afterwards present at most of the battles and siege, which he has described, and did not quit a military life until the loss of an arm and other wounds, with the approach of old age, rendered retirement necessary.

Pontault died on 10 August 1674. From the death of this able drafts-man, there were few capable military topographers in France until the latter half of the 18th century.

== Works ==
It was Pontault's practice to follow the army, and construct upon the spot plans of the battles and sieges, with historical and perspective accompaniments. Many of his plans are in the

- Œvre de Belle-Belle, (Note: Chalmers spells it Œvre de Belle-Belle but the modern spelling is Œuvre de Belle-Belle)

but his most important work is entitled:

- Les glorieuses Conquêtes de Louis-le-Grand: ou Recueil, de Plans et Vues des places assiegeés, et de celles ou se_sont douneés des batailles, avec des Discours "The glorious victories of Louis the Great, produced from the drawings of the Chevalier de Beaulieu", 2 vols. folio.

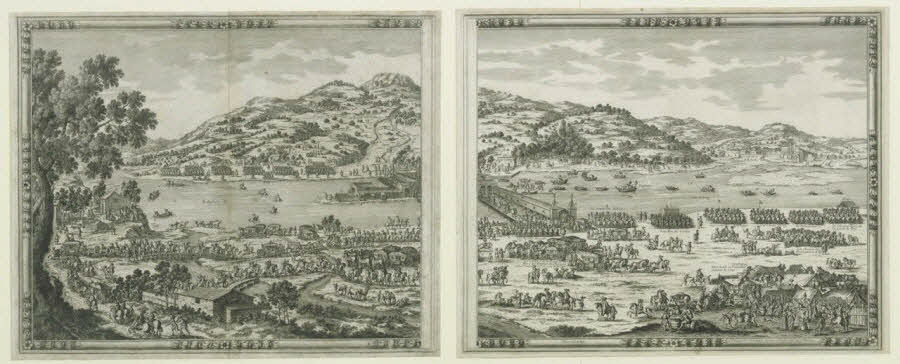
Pontault's depiction of Pheasant Island, site of the signing of the Treaty of the Pyrenees and its consequent end of the Franco-Spanish War.

This work is one of the most magnificent of the kind, covers all the operations of war, from the battle of Rocroi, in 1643, to the taking of Namur, in 1692. Pontault died in 1674; but the work was completed to the above date at the expense of his niece, the widow of the sieur Des Roches. This edition is usually called the Grand Beaulieu, to distinguish it from one on a reduced scale, in oblong quarto, called the Petit Beaulieu, of which there are two series, one in three volumes, with views of the actions in the Netherlands; the other in four, which includes those of France.

Pontault's other works include a comprehensive series of etchings—maps, landscapes, and town layouts—of Catalonia made in the years following the region's Reapers' War (itself a late element of the broader Thirty Years' War), from c. 1655-1661.
