= Suecia Antiqua et Hodierna =

- Title page of Suecia Antiqua et Hodierna
- Author: Erik Dahlbergh
- Language: Latin language
- Publisher: Erik Dahlbergh (engraver, 17th century), Daniel Tilas (republisher, 18th century)
- Publication place: Paris
- Media type: 3 volume series of books

Suecia Antiqua et Hodierna ("Ancient and Modern Sweden") is a collection of engravings collected by Erik Dahlbergh during the middle of the 17th century. Suecia Antiqua et Hodierna can be described as a grand vision of Sweden during its period as a great power. Dahlberg's direct source of inspiration was the topographical publications issued by the Swiss publisher Matthäus Merian. In 1661 Dahlberg was granted a royal privilege enabling him to realize his plans, which kept him occupied for a good decade, and a work that would not be printed until after his death. The work contains 342 engraved plates (150 in Vol. 1, 76 in Vol. 2 and 126 in Vol. 3).

== Dahlberg's project ==
Dahlberg started working on the project in 1660. On 28 March 1661, he was awarded a letters patent giving him the sole right to the work for ten years after its publication and requesting all civic authorities to assist him. Dahlberg travelled throughout the country to create precise drawings of cities and historical buildings. The original plan was to publish a comprehensive, grand topographical text alongside the plates to demonstrate Sweden's status as a European superpower.

In choosing a firm of engravers to complete the task, Dahlberg bypassed the Merian brothers because of a financial quarrel, negotiated unsuccessfully with Joan Blaeu of Amsterdam and finally, in August 1667, journeyed to France, where the first batch of engravings were to be done. During his frequent absences the project was supervised by the Swedish commission in Paris and a Swedish student, Samuel Agriconius (later ennobled and assuming the name Åkerhielm), though Dahlberg was always responsible for the aspect of the buildings (leaving figures, arms and other details to the engravers) and for the final proof-corrections to the prints.

Contracts were signed with the French engravers Jean Le Pautre, Jean Marot, F. Champion, and Nicolas and Adam Perelle, itemising the cost of approximately 70 plates, and advance payments were given. Printing of the plates was entrusted to the printer Jean Goyton, who was later to work on the Cabinet du roi. The first four engravings were sent to the Lord Chancellor in November 1667, but difficulties plagued the Suecia from then on. The Scanian War began in 1675, while the copperplates, printed sheets and text stored in the Fortifications Office in Stockholm Palace, were only just saved from a fire in May 1697. Added to these problems were the dilatoriness of the French engravers. From 1684 a series of Dutch and German engravers were engaged instead, with the help of a further government grant in 1686: Herman Padebrügge, who died in 1687 after completing nine plates, Jacob von Sandrart of Nuremberg, who engraved one plate after considerable delay, and Willem Swidde, who produced 84 plates, ten provincial coats of arms, eight vignettes, four tailpieces and a map before his death in 1696. Swidde's apprentice, Erik Reitz, who produced a further 26 plates and 15 initials, was a Swedish native and Swedish artist Johann Hammarson also worked on the project.

Dahlberg moved to Riga in the last years of his life, and supervision of the Suecia was delegated to Sven Leijonmarck and Jöran Blåman: but it was probably he who initiated the division of the work into three volumes. A fourth volume, including the Baltic provinces and German possessions, was prevented by Dahlberg's death in 1703 and the Russian occupation of the Baltic area.

== Suspension of the work and eventual publishing ==
Although Dahlbergh had managed to complete most of the drawings before his death, work came to a halt in 1715, due to the outbreak of the Great Northern War. The war placed a significant financial burden on the Swedish Empire, and funding for cultural projects evaporated. No further progress was made for several years. Following the Treaty of Frederiksborg (1720), there were even plans to melt down the copper plates and sell the metal abroad to help pay off the national debt. Ultimately, however, it was decided that the existing plates should be printed. A print run of 300 copies on higher-quality paper and 300 copies on simpler writing paper was planned. Due to a lack of funding, the collection was published without any accompanying text. The edition, totalling 600 copies, was ready for sale in 1729 or 1730. The proceeds from sales went to the national treasury.

== Second edition ==
The first complete edition had sold out by the mid-1740s. After 1751, geologist Daniel Tilas, initiated a new printing. Many of the plates had become worn and required retouching by Carl Bergquist, engraver to the Royal Swedish Academy of Sciences. In 1756, Tilas was able to print 50 copies of the new edition, and a further 400 copies were published ten years later. The two eighteenth-century editions can be distinguished by the different watermarks found on the paper. During the eighteenth century, the copper plates were kept first in the National Archives of Sweden and then in the offices of the Riksdag of the Estates. In 1770, they were moved to the Royal Library at Stockholm Palace and were transferred to the Nationalmuseum in the 1880s, where they remain today.

== Gallery ==
Gripsholm Castle

Sandemar Castle

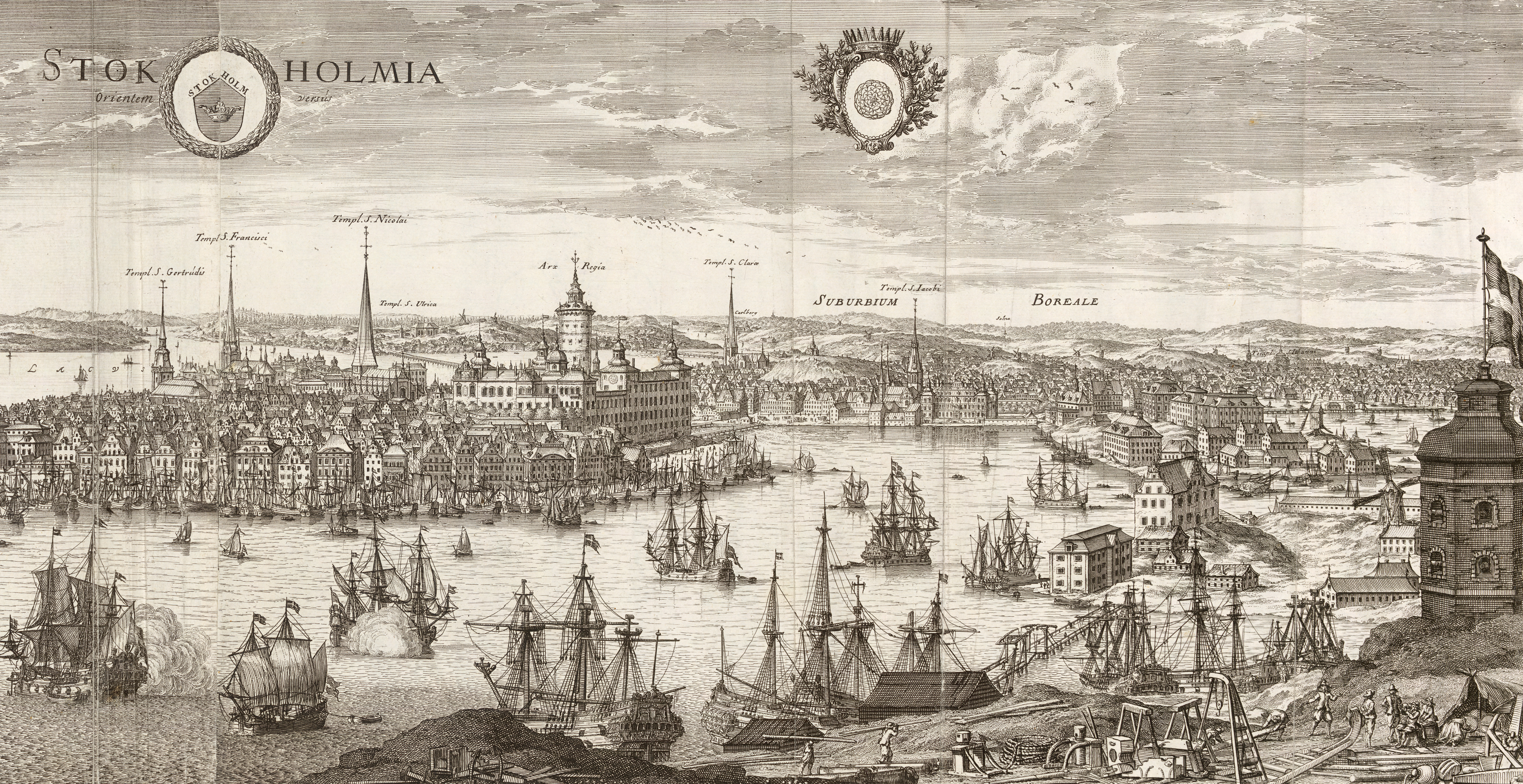
Detail of Stockholm

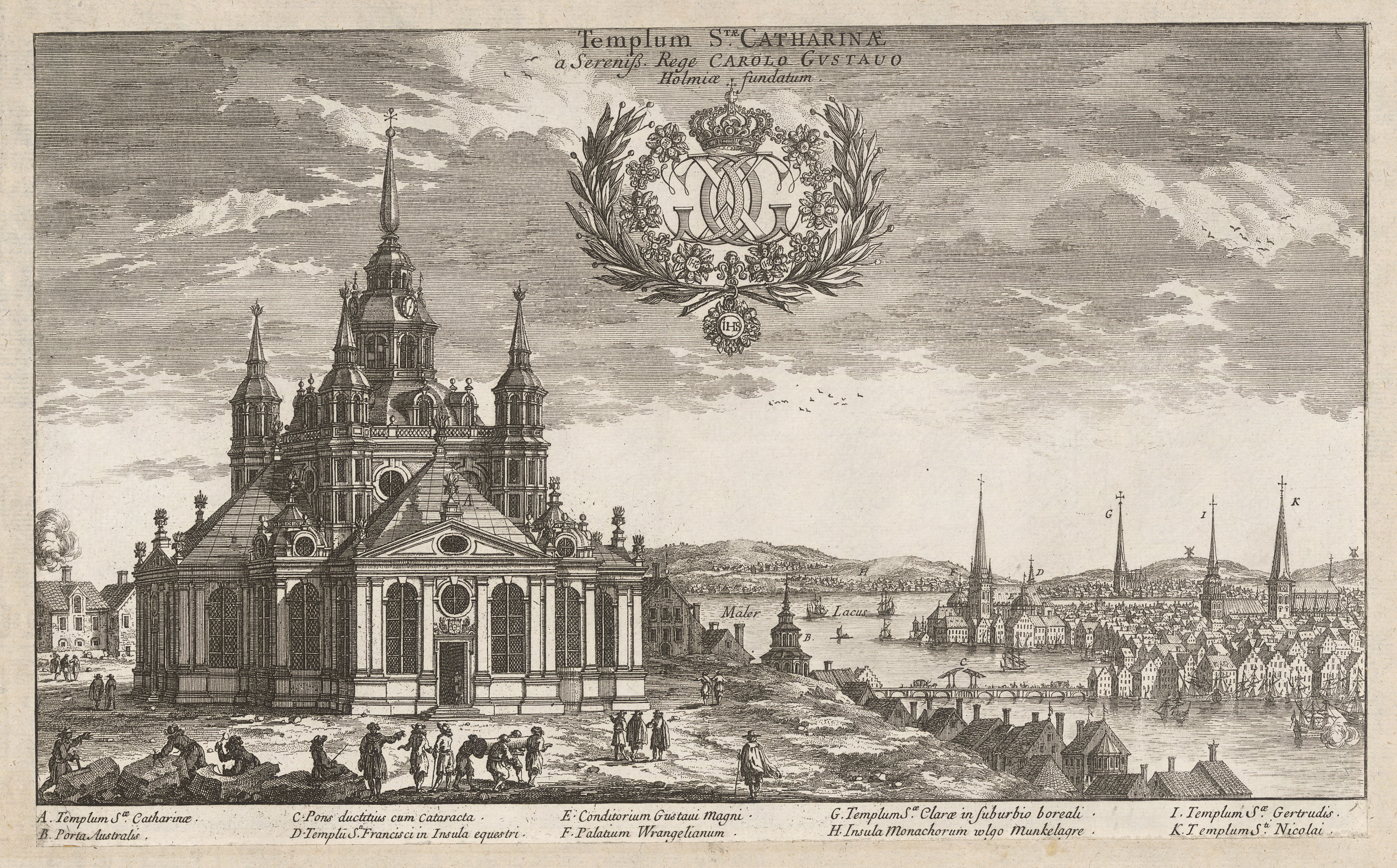
Katarina Church in Stockholm

Uppsala Castle

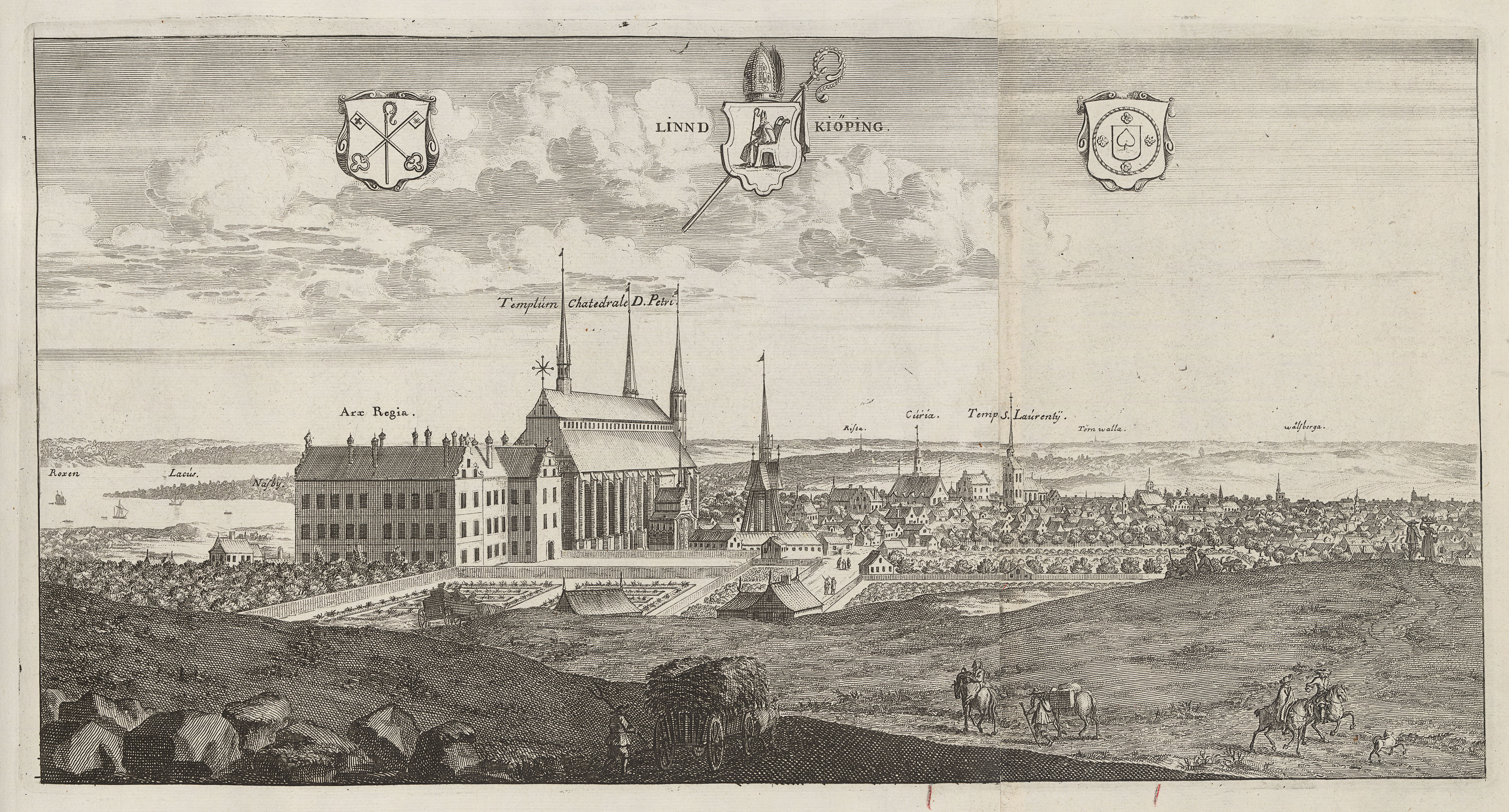
Linköping

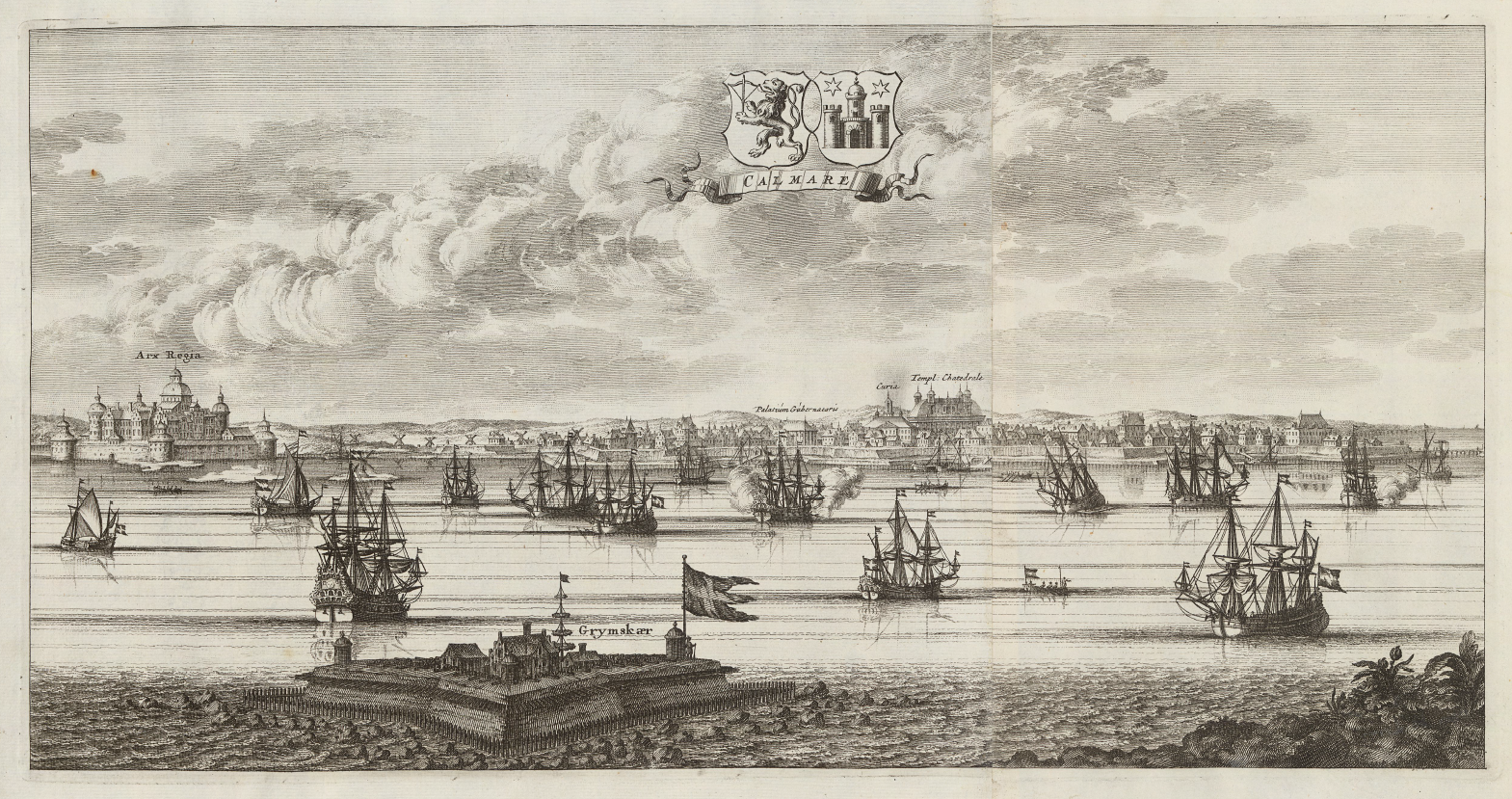
Kalmar

Drottningholm
