= Coat of arms of Gothenburg =

- Armiger: City of Gothenburg
- Adopted: 1607 – First creation 1621

The coat of arms of Gothenburg consists of images from Sweden's great coat of arms and is meant to symbolize the city as Sweden's western defence. The lion is from the arms of the Folkunga dynasty, which in the 17th century was considered to be the arms of Götaland and it holds the arms of Sweden, three crowns, defending this with a sword. The oldest description of the arms is from a letters patent from 1607.

The lion in the arms of Gothenburg is turned to heraldic left. This was originally probably made by mistake, but due to its long tradition the lion has remained in this position. An animal facing left is symbolizing someone fleeing, while one facing right would symbolize attack. The left facing version was eventually decided by Royal decision in 1952, in spite of protests from the National Heraldry Office. It may be noted that the Gothenburg-based football club IFK Göteborg has the lion turned to the other side in its logo which is based on the city arms.

Note: when the lion of the coat of arms of Gothenburg is mirrored in the IFK Göteborg logo, it unheraldically holds a shield in its right hand and a sword in its left hand.
