= Erik Dahlbergh =

Swedish military personnel

Count Erik Dahlbergh
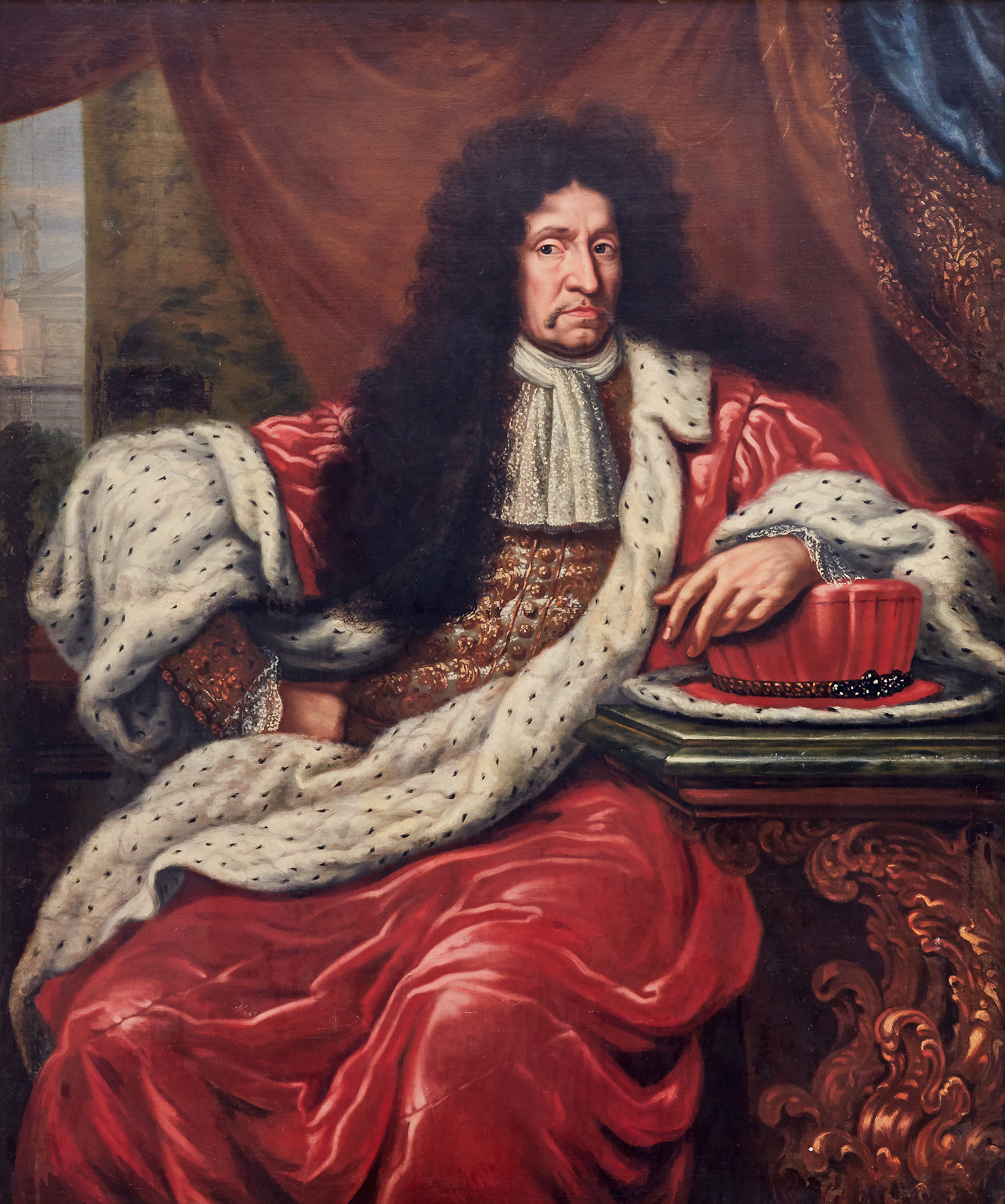
- Born: Erik Jönsson; 10 October 1625; Stockholm, Sweden
- Died: 16 January 1703 (aged 77); Stockholm, Sweden
- Military career
- Allegiance: Sweden
- Service years: 1647–1702
- Rank: Fältmarskalk
- Conflicts: Northern Wars; Scanian War; Great Northern War
- Other work: Suecia Antiqua et Hodierna

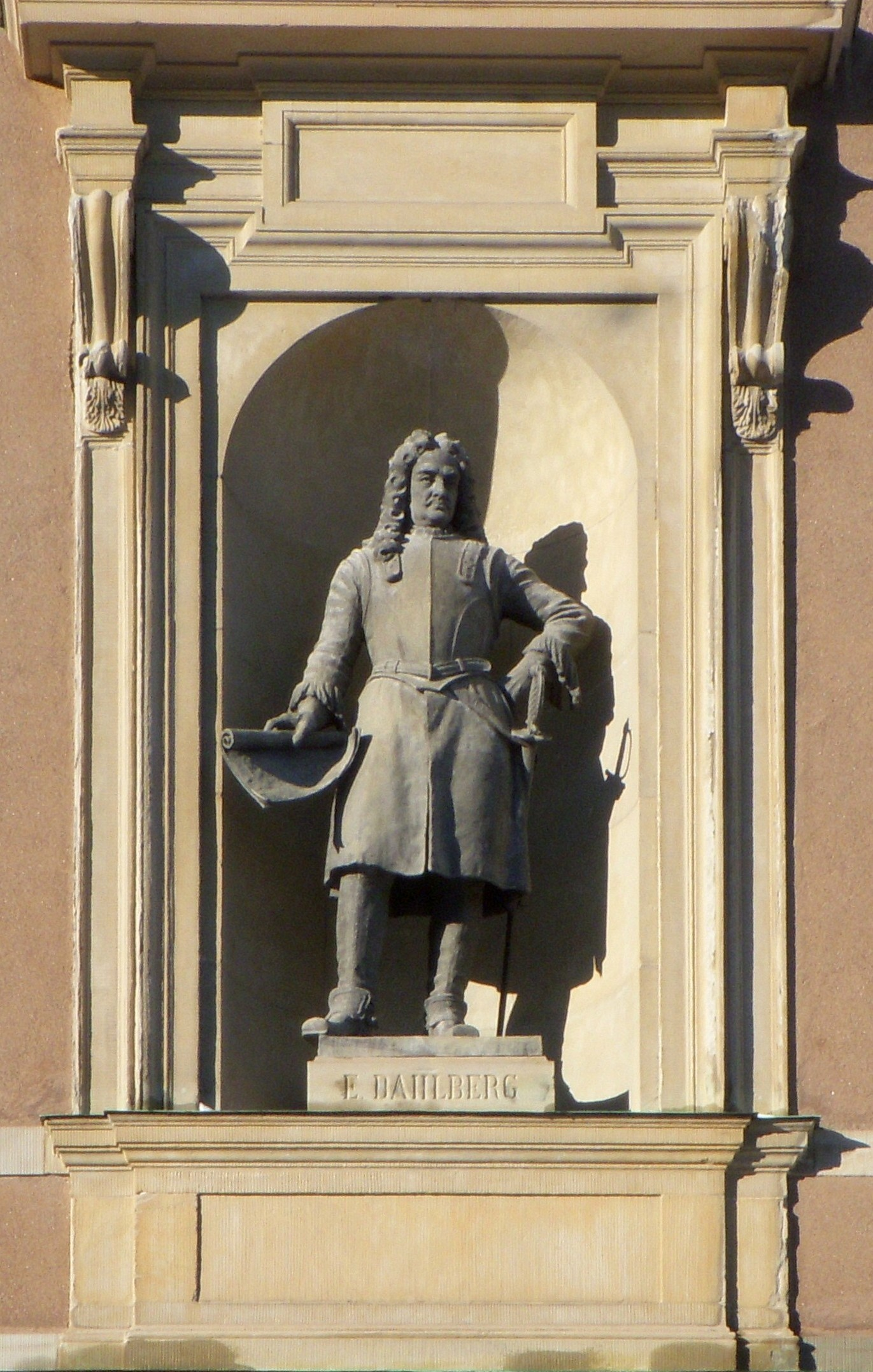
Sculpture of Erik Dahlberg. Stockholm Palace

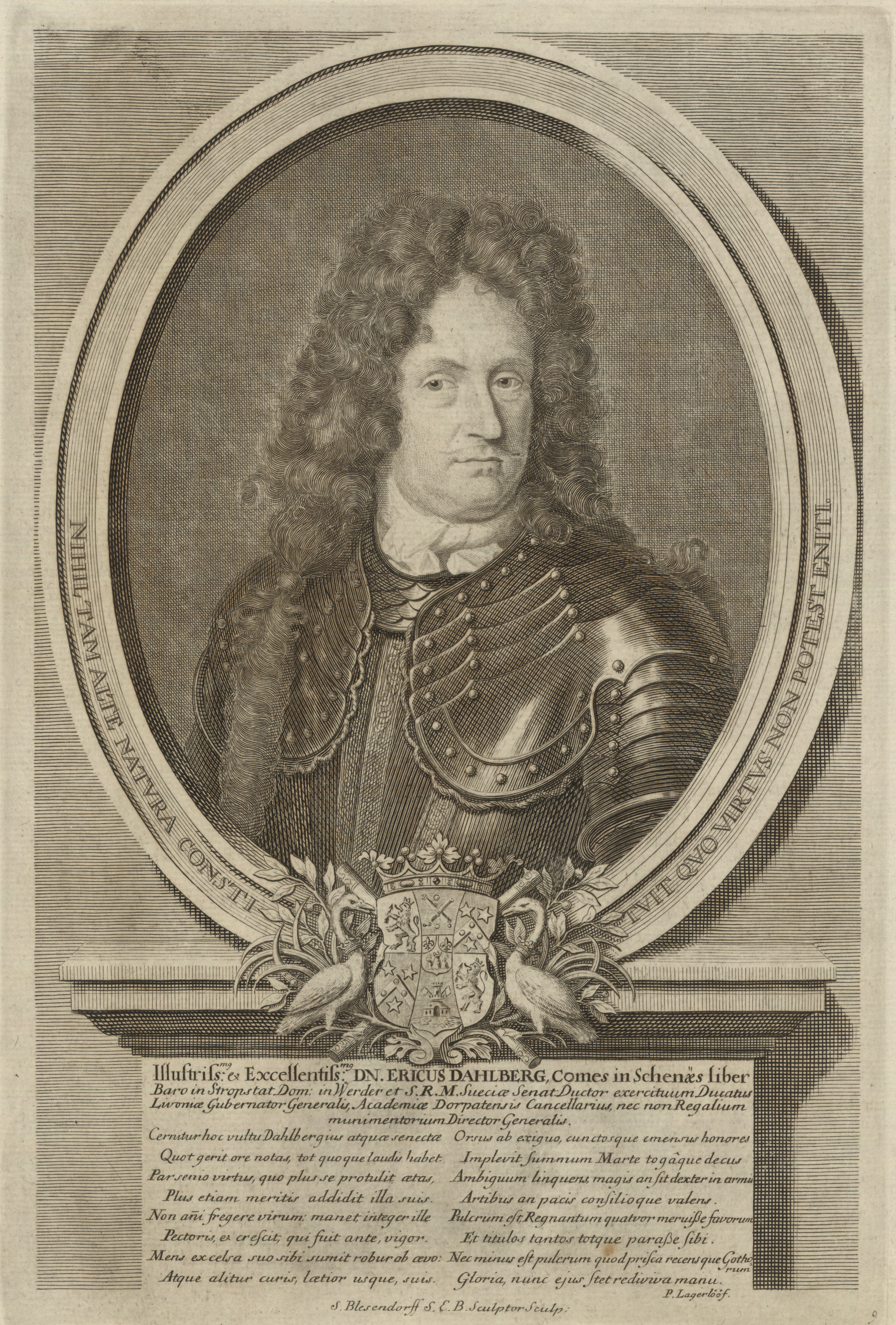
Erik Dahlbergh in Suecia Antiqua et Hodierna

Count Erik Jönsson Dahlbergh (10 October 1625 – 16 January 1703) was a Swedish military engineer, governor-general, field marshal and master-general of the ordinance. He rose to the level of nobility through his military competence. According to Cathal J. Nolan, Count Dahlbergh was a highly innovative military engineer in the 17th and 18th century, often referred to as the "Swedish Vauban". He was expert in both building and destroying fortifications. In warfare he participated in several sieges, including the successful siege of Kronborg and of Copenhagen, where he and the Swedes were repelled. He famously led a Swedish army across the frozen Great and Little Belts to attack Copenhagen. Dahlbergh commanded Swedish engineers in several wars and his historic influence was ensured via his skill at map-making, the fortresses he designed, and his widely read writings on military architecture. Today he is well known through his Suecia Antiqua et Hodierna, a collection of engravings of topographical research.

== Biography ==
Erik Dahlbergh was born in Stockholm, Sweden. His early studies involved the science of fortification. Orphaned at an early age, Dahlbergh's studies qualified him as a scribe and in 1641 he found employment in Hamburg with Gerdt Rehnskiöld (1610−1658), senior accountant for Pommern and Mecklenburg. Over a six year period, he was taught the fundamentals in draughtsmanship. While learning these skills, he also studied mathematics, architecture, perspective and map drawing.

He saw service as an engineer officer during the latter years of the Thirty Years' War. In 1650, the military command dispatched Dahlbergh to Frankfurt to recoup war indemnity awarded to Sweden following the Treaty of Westphalia. Dahlbergh also contacted the publishing firm of Merian and provided topographical maps.

While studying art in Italy, news reached him of a coming war between Sweden and Poland-Lithuania and he saw the potential for a military career. In his military career, Dahlbergh saw service in Poland as adjutant-general and engineering adviser to Charles X of Sweden. He participated in March across the Belts and at the sieges of Copenhagen and Kronborg where he directed the engineers during the Northern Wars.

In spite of his distinguished service, Dahlbergh remained a lieutenant-colonel for many years. His talents were later recognized and in 1674, he became Quartermaster General and the head of the Swedish Fortification Corps. As director, Dahlbergh rendered distinguished service over the next twenty-five years.

At Helsingborg in 1677, he was a key operative in the Great Northern War at Dunamünde, and in 1700 he was instrumental in the defense of the two sieges of Riga. His work in repairing the fortresses of his own country earned for him the title of the "Vauban of Sweden". He was also the founder of the Swedish engineer corps. He retired while in the rank of field marshal in 1702 and died the following year.

== Legacy ==
In modern times, Erik Dahlbergh is best known for compiling the collection of engravings called "Suecia Antiqua et Hodierna" published 1660–1716, and for assisting Samuel Pufendorf in his "Histoire de Charles X Gustave". He also wrote a memoir of his life (Svenska Bibliotek, 1757) and an account "Of the campaigns of Charles X" (ed. Lundblad, Stockholm, 1823).

== Appointments ==
- Governor of Jönköping County (1687–1693)
- Governor-General of Bremen-Verden (1693)
- Field Marshal (1693)
- Governor-General of Livonia (1696–1702)

== See also ==
- Fortifications of Gothenburg
- Sébastien Le Prestre de Vauban
- Menno van Coehoorn
- Tureholm Castle

== Other sources ==
- Leif Jonsson (1992) Stormaktstid : Erik Dahlbergh och bilden av Sverige (Lidköping: Stiftelsen Läckö Institutet) ISBN 9789197168519
