= Acrylicize =

British design company

Acrylicize is a studio of artists, designers and craftsmen.

== History ==
Acrylicize was founded in 2003 by artist James Burke during his final year while studying contemporary arts at Manchester Metropolitan University. The exhibition consisted of several ink-designed acrylic pieces with mock price tags which people took for real. After the majority of the exhibits had sold, Burke formed the company, and was joined by Paul Arad, a business graduate, joined six months later.

Acrylicize's commissions include Spotify, Amazon, Microsoft, Wimbledon Tennis Club, The Coca-Cola Company, H. J. Heinz Company, Google, Moet Hennessey, Deloitte and Touche, Helical Bar, University of Hull campus, Heathrow Airport Terminals 3 & 5, London Luton Airport, the BBC Media Village in White City, Addison Lee and The Office Group and others. Acrylicize completed interior work for several of the UK's stadiums including Wembley Stadium, the Emirates Stadium, Twickenham and the Millennium Stadium in Cardiff.

== Awards ==
In November 2014, Acrylicize were named 'Breakthrough Talent' at the FX Awards, hosted by FX Magazine. They were also awarded 'Best Product Award' from the British Interior Design Association in 2003. In 2010, they were nominated for Business of the Year at the TrainE-TradiE awards. In 2012, Acrylicize were awarded the TrainE TraidE Business of the Year title.

== Media coverage ==
Articles covering Acrylicize have been published in The Independent, The Evening Standard, Metro, the front cover of FX, OnOffice, Hypebeast and Design Exchange, and others.
