= Gothenburg Cathedral =

- Gustavi domkyrka
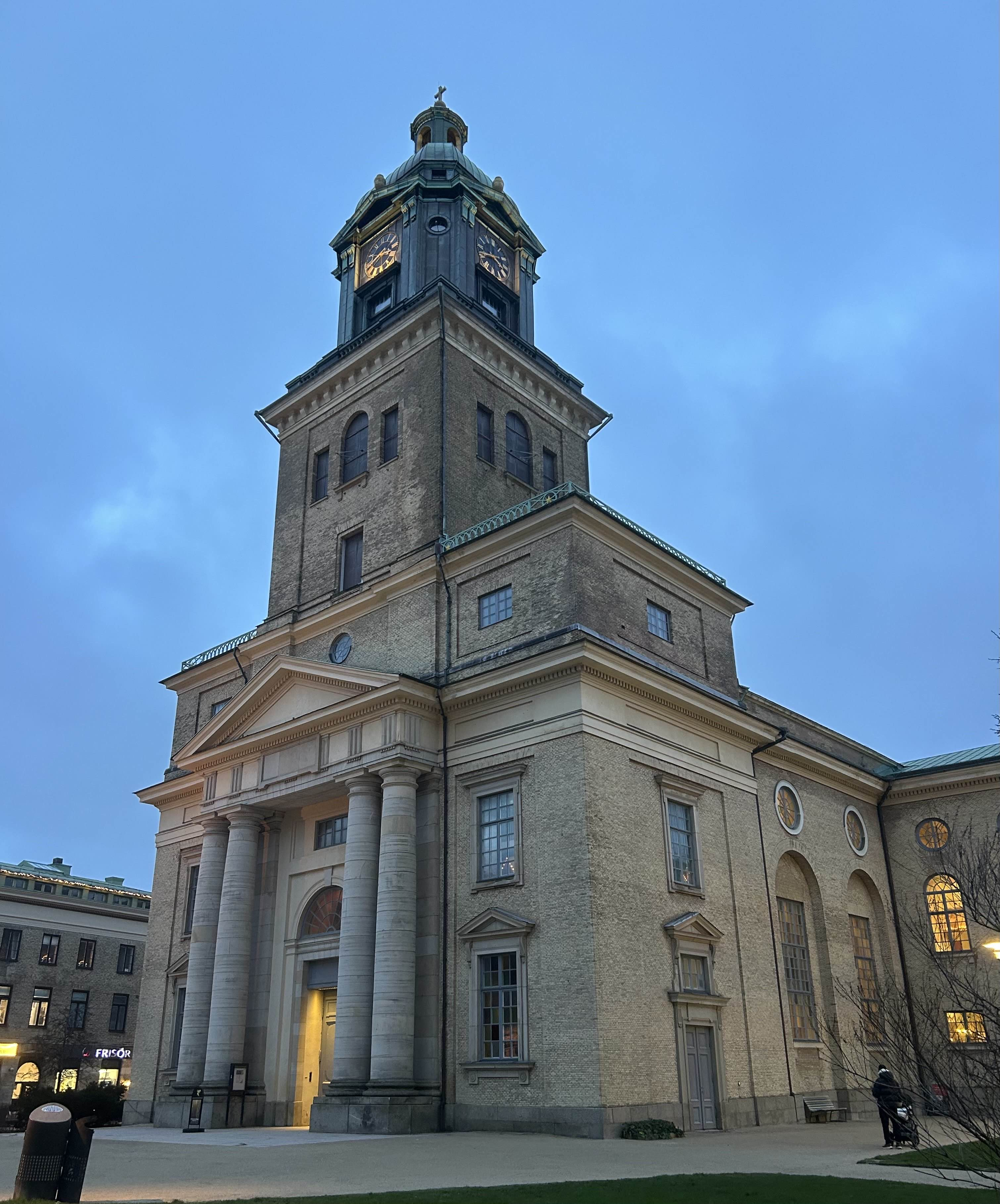
- Frontview of the Gothenburg Cathedral
- Gothenburg Cathedral
- 57°42′16″N 11°57′55″E
- Location: Gothenburg
- Country: Sweden
- Denomination: Church of Sweden

Architecture
- Architect: Carl Wilhelm Carlberg
- Style: Classicism

Administration
- Diocese: Diocese of Gothenburg

Clergy
- Bishop: Susanne Rappman
- Dean: Stefan Hiller

Gothenburg Cathedral (Swedish: Gustavi domkyrka / Göteborgs domkyrka) is a cathedral in Gothenburg, the second largest city in Sweden. It is the seat of the bishop of the diocese of Gothenburg in the Church of Sweden.

== Original church ==
Before the first cathedral was inaugurated in 1633, a temporary church known as the Gothenburg stave church (Swedish: Brädekyrkan) stood on the site for approximately 12 years. This was one of the city's first buildings and the first church in the current city of Gothenburg, which is the third city founded at the mouth of the Göta River and the second to have that name.

== The first cathedral ==
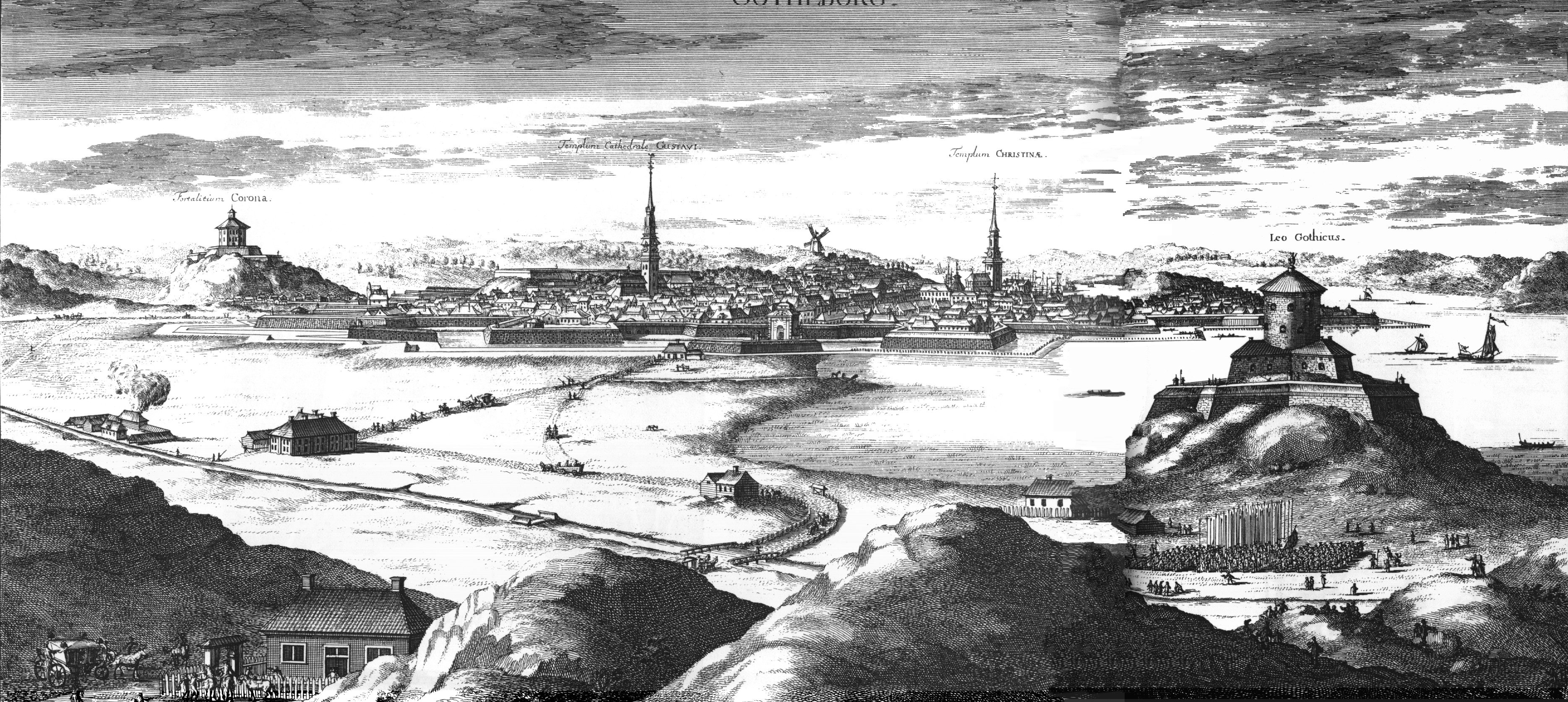
The first cathedral is depicted on the left side of this image from Suecia Antiqua et Hodierna, which also shows the city's defensive fortifications. Behind the Skansen Lion bastion to the right is the marsh of Gullbergsvass, now the site of Gothenburg Central Station.

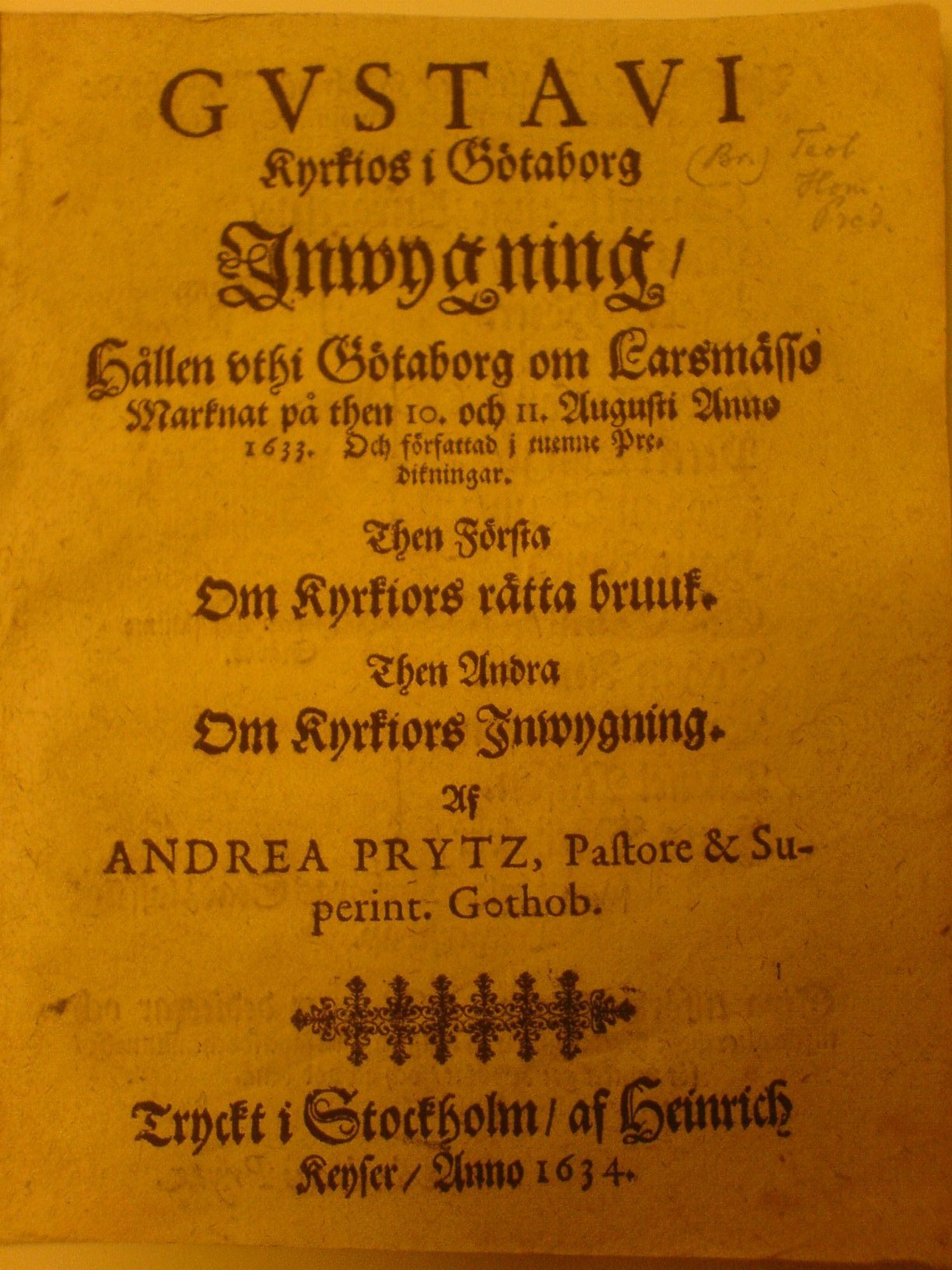
Announcement of superintendent Prytz's sermon at the inauguration of the first church in 1633, published by Heinrich Keyser, 1634. From Library of Lund University.

The rectory was completed in 1624, and the construction of a new church on the site of the stave church was announced in 1627. King Gustavus Adolphus created a tax to pay for the work. The initial demand was for a barrel (just over 125 litres) of wheat, oats, barley or rye from each church-owned property in Västergötland province for a three-year period. In a letter to Gothenburg's town council (13 December 1629) the tax was extended for three more years. From 1625 to 1634, construction costs increased to 8,387 Swedish riksdaler.

Construction was led by master mason Lars Nilsson. The foundation stone was laid by Gothenburg's justitiepresident (judge) Nils Börjesson Drakenberg on 19 June 1626, and in 1633 the new main building was complete. By 1633, the stave church had been torn down, although its tower remained in use as a guard tower. During the construction period and for some time thereafter, the church was called stora kyrkan (the great church), the name used in the accounting records. It remained standing for nine more years, until a new tower replaced it in January 1643.

On 10 and 11 August 1633 superintendent Andreas Prytz consecrated the church with two sermons: "On the right use of churches" and "On the consecration of churches". The inauguration is commemorated at the cathedral with an annual sermon on 10 August. The church was not designated as a cathedral (domkyrke) until the 1680s.

No contemporary documents relating to the installation of the church bells have been found. The bells are mentioned retrospectively by Eric Cederbourg (1739):

In the tower were hung three large and beautiful bells, whose strong and harmonious sound could be heard for [over 8 km]; on the north wall of the tower a large, well-founded bell of 6 skeppspund [1,020 kg] weight was erected to chime the hour.

The first tower clock mechanism, made by clockmaker Per Larsson in 1648, was replaced in 1670 by one made by Jacob Hertingk of Stralsund.

The church was built of granite, faced with Dutch bricks and adorned with 18 iron-trimmed Palladian windows placed between buttressing supports. It had an ornate arched entry door with iron fittings. The building was 48.1 metres long, 20.2 metres wide and 26.5 metres high at the pediment roof. It had no transept. The tower wall was 27.6 feet high, not counting its spire. The church roof was clad with oak shingles and topped with copper plates; on the eastern end of the roof was a weather vane in the form of a large copper-gilded sun, which in 1700 had been so weakened that it was replaced with a wooden cap. The cathedral spire was demolished and replaced in 1700.

=== The cathedral interior ===
The cathedral had seventeen octagonal weight-bearing columns: eight on each side of the nave and one in the choir. They had a square socle. Each side was two ells (1.2 metres) wide.

The original pulpit was of the German-Dutch type, and its intarsia and other carving work suggests that it had been crafted either in Lübeck or by some North Germans residing in Gothenburg. It was replaced in the late 1670s and transferred to the newly built Kungälvs Church in 1682. Sculptor Marcus Jaeger the Elder carved the new pulpit with historical images in alabaster and ebony in 1674. He also made the baptismal font and executed numerous carvings on the lecterns and pews.

The cathedral included a throne (a royal pew) placed over grave No. 19 to the south of the nave, between the first two pillars from the chancel. Jaeger completed it in the 1680s and was paid 960 silver riksdaler for it. In 1869 tailor Torsten Gunnarsson upholstered the throne in red velvet, probably in honour of Charles XI's 10 September visit to Gothenburg. Four years later, for 400 silver riksdaler, John Hammer painted the king's throne in white alabaster and gold.

The first organ, probably a positive organ with only four to six stops, had been installed by 1648. In 1661 organ builder Hans Horn completed a new pipe organ, and further work on it was completed around 1700. Jaeger was hired in 1697 to produce four Corinthian pillars beneath the organ to elevate it, probably in the west part of the nave, near the tower wall. The organ was repaired several times: in 1696 by Christian Rüdiger, in 1699 by John George Ambthor and in 1707 by Elias Wittig. Both Rüdiger and Ambthor were German organ masters; Wittig was a journeyman.

=== Cathedral designation ===
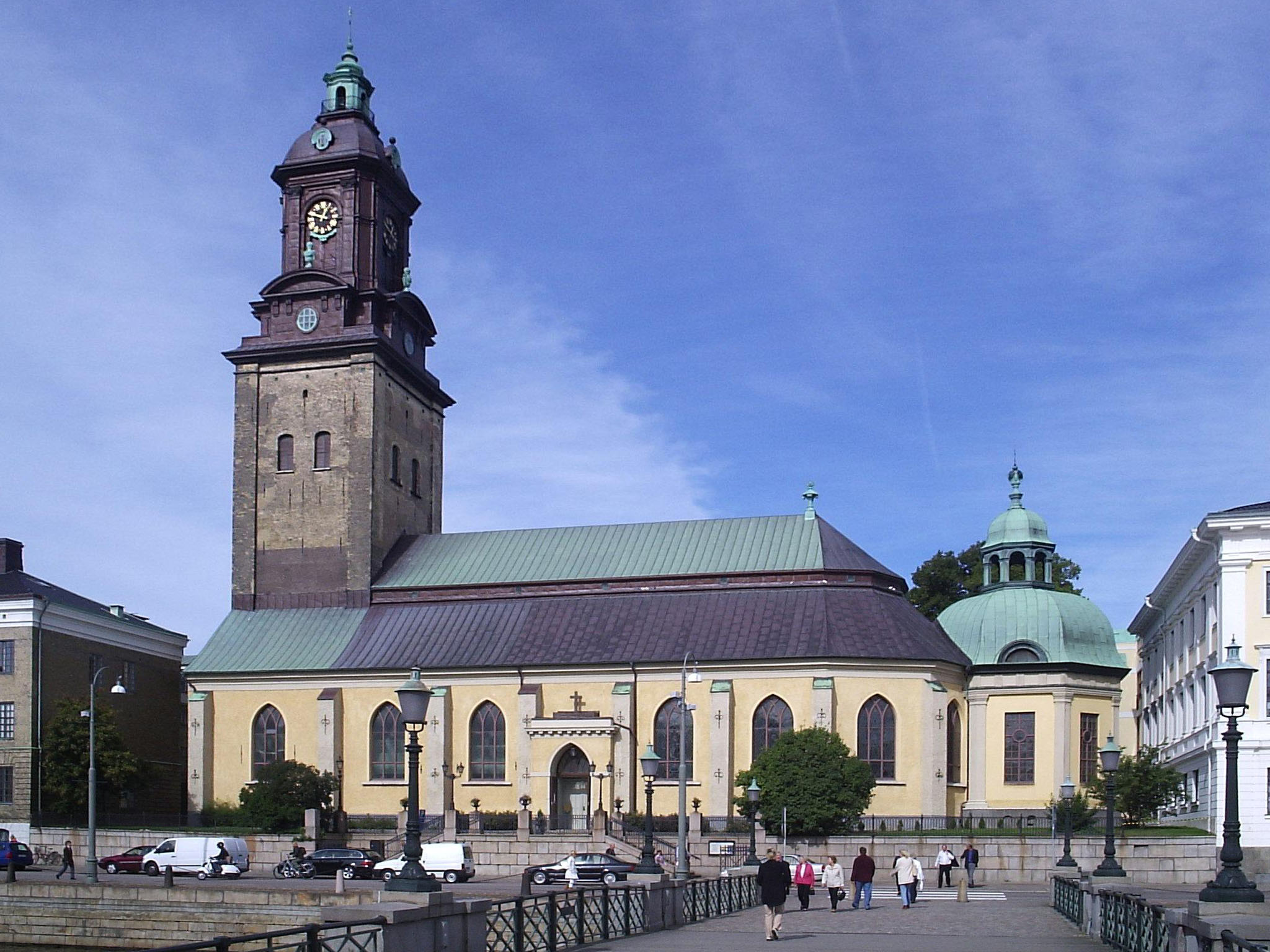
German Church, Gothenburg

The church was part of the established Church of Sweden and was initially named "Gustavi church" after Gustavus Adolphus of Sweden. It was also known as the Swedish Church (Swedish: Svenska kyrkan), to distinguish it from Gothenburg's German Church (Swedish: Tyska kyrkan). With the change from superintendency to bishopric and the establishment of a cathedral chapter in 1665, it was elevated to cathedral status.

=== Cemeteries ===
The city's oldest cemetery was located at the foot of Kvarnberget, west of Kronhuset – once an armoury and now a historical museum and concert site – on the corner of the present Torggatan, then called Kyrkogårdsgränden and Sillgatan (now Postgatan). By 1645 the marshy area around the cathedral had been filled with sand and could be used as a burial ground. The square, known by 1846 as Domkyrkoplatsen (Cathedral Square) and by 1883 as Domkyrkoplanen (Cathedral Close) 1883, had since 1644 been demarcated by a wall with arched gates to the north and south.

== The second cathedral ==
On the night of 15 April 1721 the cathedral, high school and 211 residential buildings in the vicinity of the cathedral burned down. As the cathedral walls remained standing, it was possible to restore the building quite quickly. Barely a month after the fire, at the request of city manager (politieborgmästare) Hans von Gerdes (1637–1723), the architect Paul Ludvig Leyonsparre presented three options for rebuilding the church, the third of which was recommended by county governor (landshövding) Nils Posse. The cathedral reopened on 25 May 1722, only 13 months after the fire, with the same dimensions as the old cathedral, but with a tower capital instead of the former spire. The roof proved to be so leaky that county governor Axel Gyllenkrok complained in October 1724 of rain and snow getting through. In December 1725 the city engineer was instructed to draw up proposals for a new copper roof covering, and work began in June 1726.

The tower took another ten years to complete, and city engineer Johan Eberhard Carlberg (an uncle of Carl Wilhelm Carlberg, the architect of the current cathedral) designed a temporary belfry for the churchyard. It could not be put into service until 1726 because the bell had to be cast in a foundry, but it was in use for six years, until 1732, when the new tower was finally brought into service.

The new tower was designed by the builder of the German Christinenkirche tower, the naval master builder Nicolaus Müller. It closely resembled that of the German church, and contemporary pictures of even show it having a similar cap. The tower was octagonal and its top was 26.7 metres above the tower wall. The largest of the three church bells weighed 1,700 kg, while the other two each weighed 1,020 kg. They were cast in 1726 by Erik Näsman, who had moved from Jönköping to Stockholm and who cast a bell for Skara Cathedral the following year.

The ceiling came into place between 1734 and 1739. The south-side lectern was finished in 1739. The floor was completed in April 1740 with 1,400 tiles of Öland limestone, 2 Swedish ells (59.4 cm) square and 2.25 Swedish inches (5.57 cm) thick. In October 1731, Carlberg received approval for his drawing of a (provisional) pulpit. An organ was built in 1733–1734 by the organ builder Johan Niclas Cahman. A contract signed on 11 January 1733 specified that it was to be completed "in a good and perfect state, equal to the organ works now to be found in Uppsala". The organ cost 8,500 silver riksdaler, and was equipped with 32 stops and 5 bellows.

In January 1750, superintendent Carl Hårleman proposed a sculpted altarpiece to portray Christ, a cross and two kneeling angels. The cost of the artwork was donated by pharmacist Franz Martin Luth (1679–1763). The contract was assigned on 1 March 1751, the altar was completed on 1 February 1754, and it was inaugurated on Advent Sunday, 1 December 1754. It is still used as the altar of the cathedral.

In 1769 a charnel house was built on the northwestern part of the cathedral block, on the corner of Kyrkogatan and Västra Hamngatan, with space for forty coffins. To avoid a bad smell in the church, the mayor and council (magistrat) of Gothenburg decided that all corpses buried during the six warmer months from 1 April to 1 October would first be stored in the charnel house.

In the same year as the charnel house was added, the churchyard wall was also finished. It was a 469-ell (approximately 279 metres) wall around Domkyrkoplanen, with a granite footing; the wall itself was of brick and covered by large blocks of chiselled Öland limestone. Set into the walls were five spacious gates built of hard-fired clinker brick and covered with sheet lead. The materials from three of these gates were moved after the 1802 fire to the new cemetery at the poorhouse meadow in the Stampen ward of Gothenburg.

In 1775, French sculptor Pierre Hubert Larchevesque (1721–1778) sculpted a cathedral monument to Colin Campbell (1686–1757), the co-founder of the Swedish East India Company.

== The third (current) cathedral ==
The second cathedral burned down on 20 December 1802 along with 179 houses. John Hall the Elder's funeral had been held in the cathedral shortly before, and his remains were still there, waiting for the completion of a large tomb at the Örgryte Cemetery, so both the corpse and the costly coffin were destroyed. The graves in the cemetery surrounding the cathedral were also so badly damaged that the churchyard had to be abandoned as a burial ground. Burials were moved to the "New Cemetery" at Stampen, which opened on 11 May 1804 and was originally intended only for the congregations of the cathedral and of the Christinenkirche. Materials from the demolished cathedral walls and three iron gates were sold at auction, and the proceeds were used for a new cemetery enclosure at Stampen.

This time, the building was so severely damaged that the walls could not be reused. The building of a new church started in 1804. The grounds of the old church were reused to the extent that they coincided with the new building (the transept did not exist previously, for example). Stones from the old church were used for private buildings, including the "Ingelmanska house" in the East Harbor Road. The church was consecrated by Bishop Johan Wingård on Trinity Sunday, 21 May 1815.

The new cathedral was designed by architect Carl Wilhelm Carlberg. He died on 14 April 1814 and construction was completed by his pupil, Major Justus Frederick Weinberg. It is said that Weinberg did not attend the inauguration for fear that the church's thin, flat arches would collapse (in the early 20th century the structure was reinforced). When the church reopened, a tower was still lacking. It was inaugurated ten years later, in 1825, and two years later its copper cladding was in place. A second inauguration was held on 9 September 1827. In 1807, Dean Hall was built at the corner of Cross Street 22 and Vallgatan 28 after wall-builder Gottlieb Lindner's drawings.

After the 1802 fire the old cemetery was converted into an open square, Kyrkotorget, and in 1822 the whole area around the church, and west to Western Hamnkanalen (which joined in the middle of the current Western Port Road, and was filled in 1903–1905) was paved with cobblestones. The name was changed in 1846 to Domkyrkoplatsen. The grounds around the church site were planted in 1851 and surrounded with iron fencing around 1860. The name was changed to Domkyrkoplanen in 1883. After completion, the church exterior was basically the one seen today, the major change being that the end walls of the tower's lateral extensions were demolished in 1832 and replaced by an iron railing. The cathedral's assessed value in 1889 was 500,000 Swedish kronor.

It is estimated that approximately 20,000 people have been buried in the church area, while 3,000 people were buried inside the church between 1635 and 1802. A plaque on the east side of the chancel recalls this use with the following text:

Domkyrkoplanen has for centuries been a cemetery.
Here rests the dust of twenty thousand dead.

The cathedral was the first church in Sweden to be fitted with central heating, which was installed in 1852 under the management of the English civil engineer Hadon. Gas lighting was installed in 1853. The church was insured in 1857 for fire with the Skandia Insurance Company for the sum of 500,000 Riksdaler.

The church tower began to lean precariously to the southwest in the early 20th century, and the church and Domkyrkoplanen were shut down for an extended period for basic reinforcement. High Masses were held in the German Church and evensong and weekly church services in Landala chapel.

A comprehensive restoration was carried out in 1904. The church received new flooring, new windows and doors, new benches and a new temperature management system. A further restoration in 1954–1957 included driving 313 concrete piles into the bedrock to stabilize the building. In the years 1983–1985 there was another Renovation.

Until the late 1990s one could visit the cathedral tower and one of its eight small balconies using an elevator followed by a staircase of 151 steps. During installation of a new elevator in November 2013, the walls of the first cathedral were found 30 cm (11.81 in) underneath the floor.

== Cathedral architecture ==
The present cathedral was designed in classical style and was larger than the two earlier buildings. It is now 59.4 metres long and 38 meters wide, including the new transept, which did not previously exist. The cattle and nave are 22.86 metres wide. The interior height of the nave is 14.25 metres excluding the tower, and 52.85 metres including the tower.

An example of the classical style is the large main portal at the west end. It is framed by four doric columns on a pediment.

=== Trim and interior ===
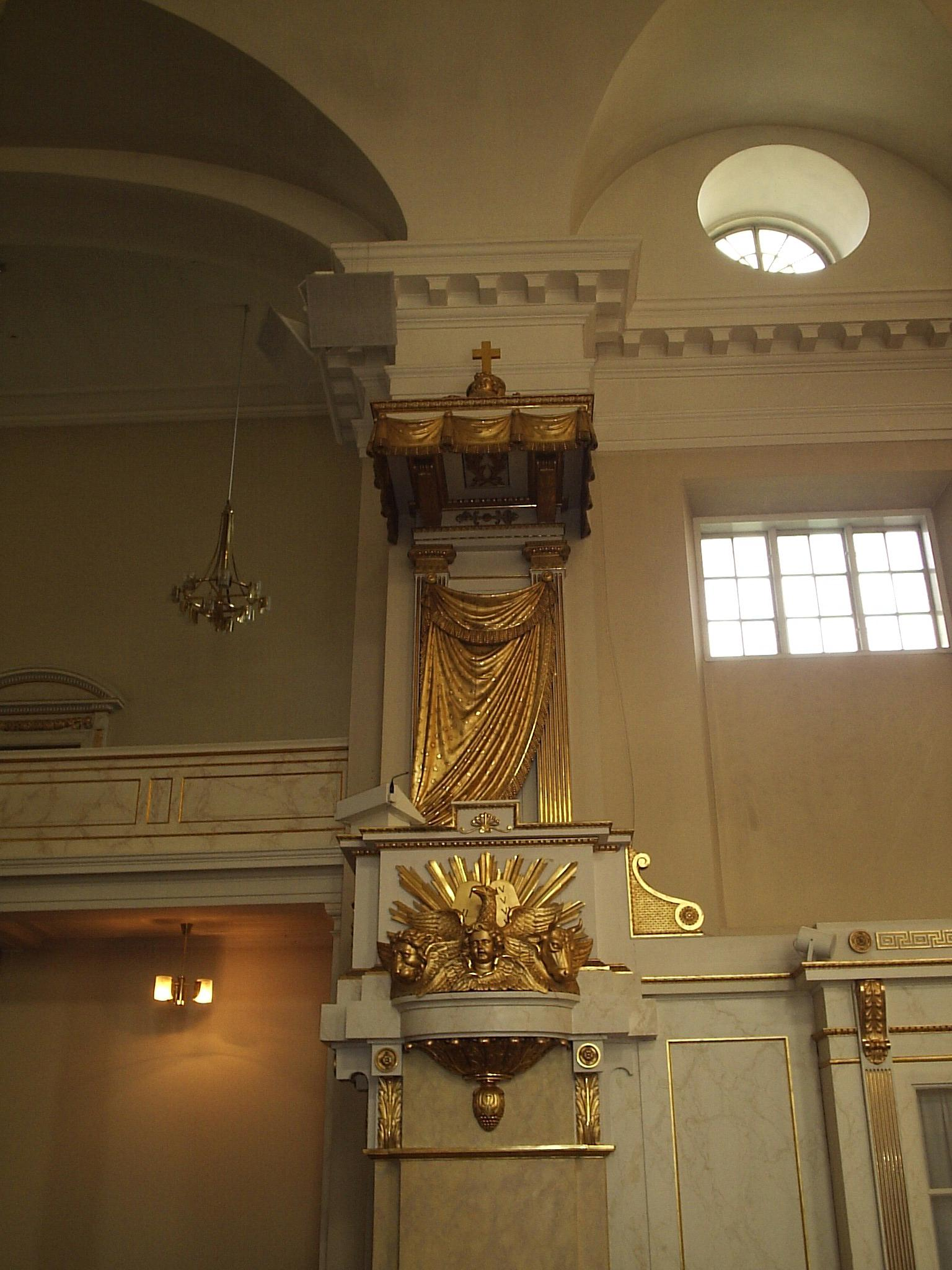
Axel Magnus Fahlcrantz designed the pulpit in Empire style. It is also adorned with Fahlcrantz's sculpture. Harri Blomberg photo

The interior shows elements of various styles, mainly classical and Empire style. The ionic pilasters on the cattle wall are classical. The pilasters are built of red marble with gold leaf at the top. The stands in the transept and the organ loft in the west are also classical.

Emipire style is represented in the combination of white and gold leaves in many of the interior fittings, the glazed episcopal bench that is used today to chat to visitors and the clergy, the wall clock and the stands. Also in empire style is the pulpit, designed by the architect Axel Magnus Fahlcrantz.

Angelic figures on the altar, on the other hand, represent a Baroque style because they belong to the ancient altar set from the 18th century. The figures were sculpted in 1752 by Jacques Adrien Masreliez, led by Carl Hårleman, and were salvaged from the fire.

The old white, partly gold-plated grandfather clock in the cathedral is from the 18th century and was saved from the 1802 fire. During the 1954–1957 restoration it was moved from its previous position by the southern long wall on King Street to the south-east transept wall at the entrance to the episcopal bench. The clock has a painted cover with gilded moldings that suit the style of other furnishings in the church. It was produced in 1751 in Gothenburg by watchmaker Olof Rising, who also made clocks. Gothenburg clock specialist Arthur Johnson refurbished the clock thoroughly in 1957, including the chimes.

=== The organ ===
The current organ in the organ loft at the west end dates from 1962 but has maintained its original façade of white and gold. (The previous organ was built by the Stockholm organ builder Olof Schwan (1744–1812), who was contracted on 3 August 1805 but died in 1812. The work was taken over by John Eberhard, and on 1 December 1816 the new organ was inaugurated.)

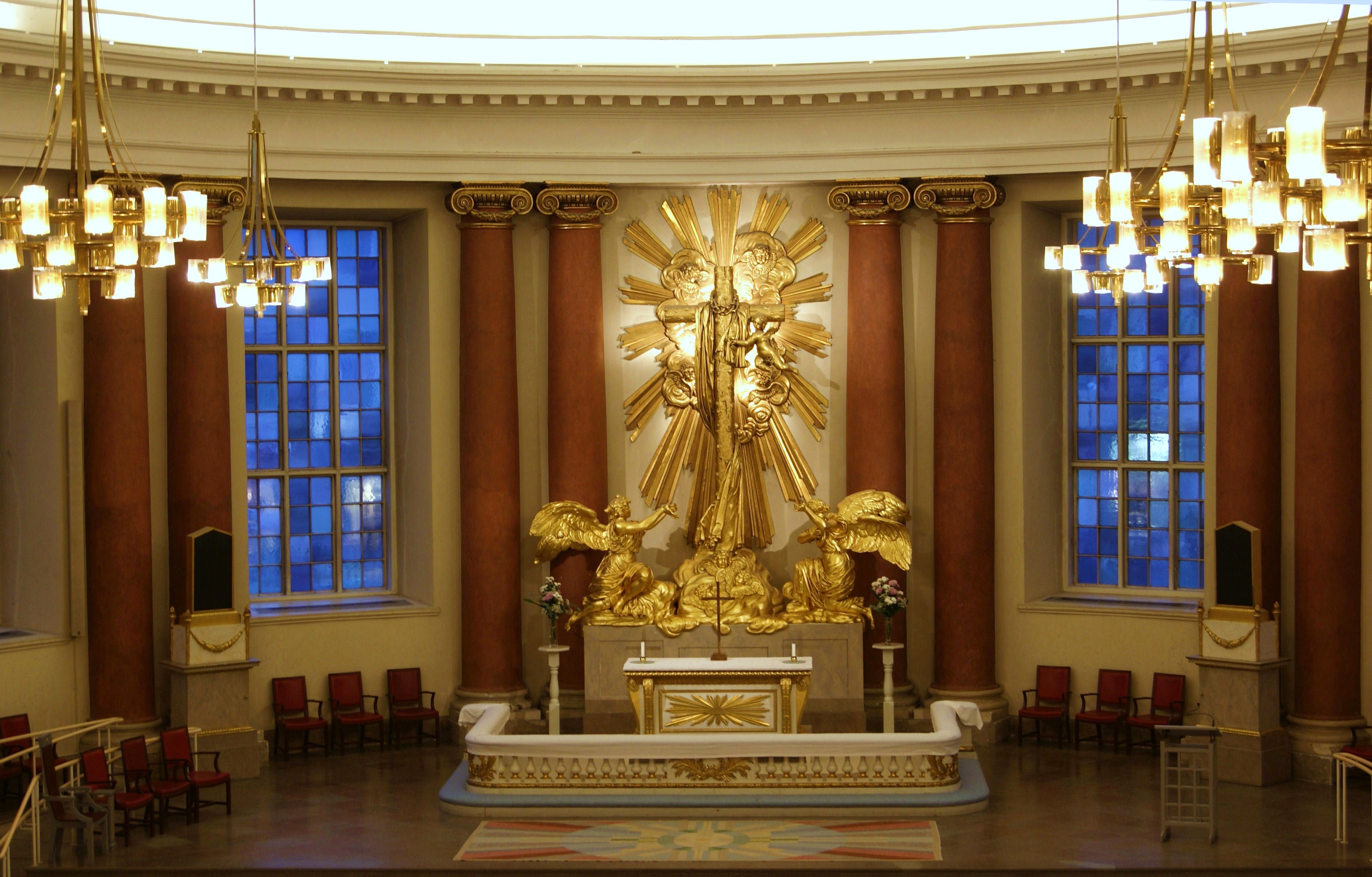
The altar

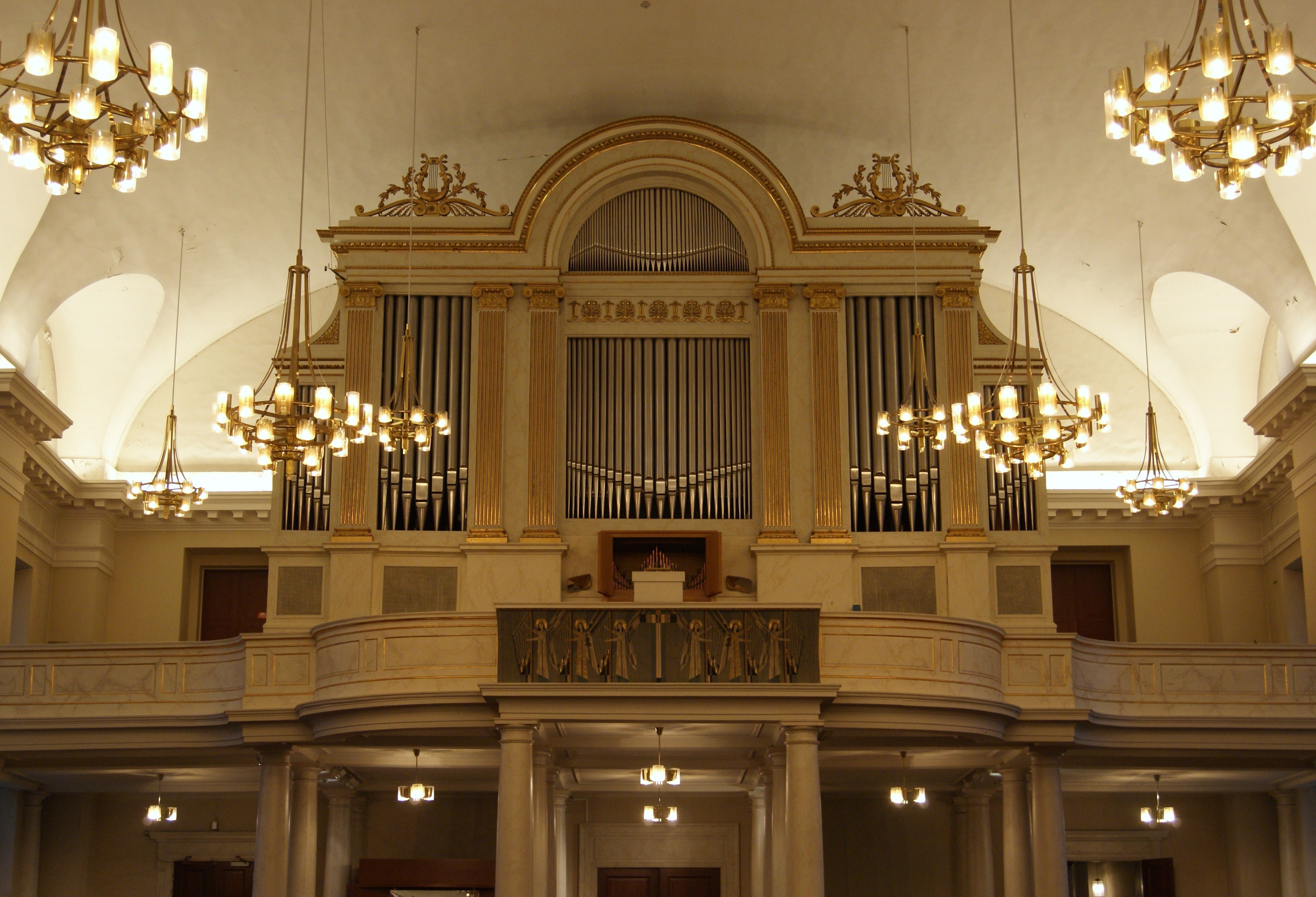
The organ with the original façade

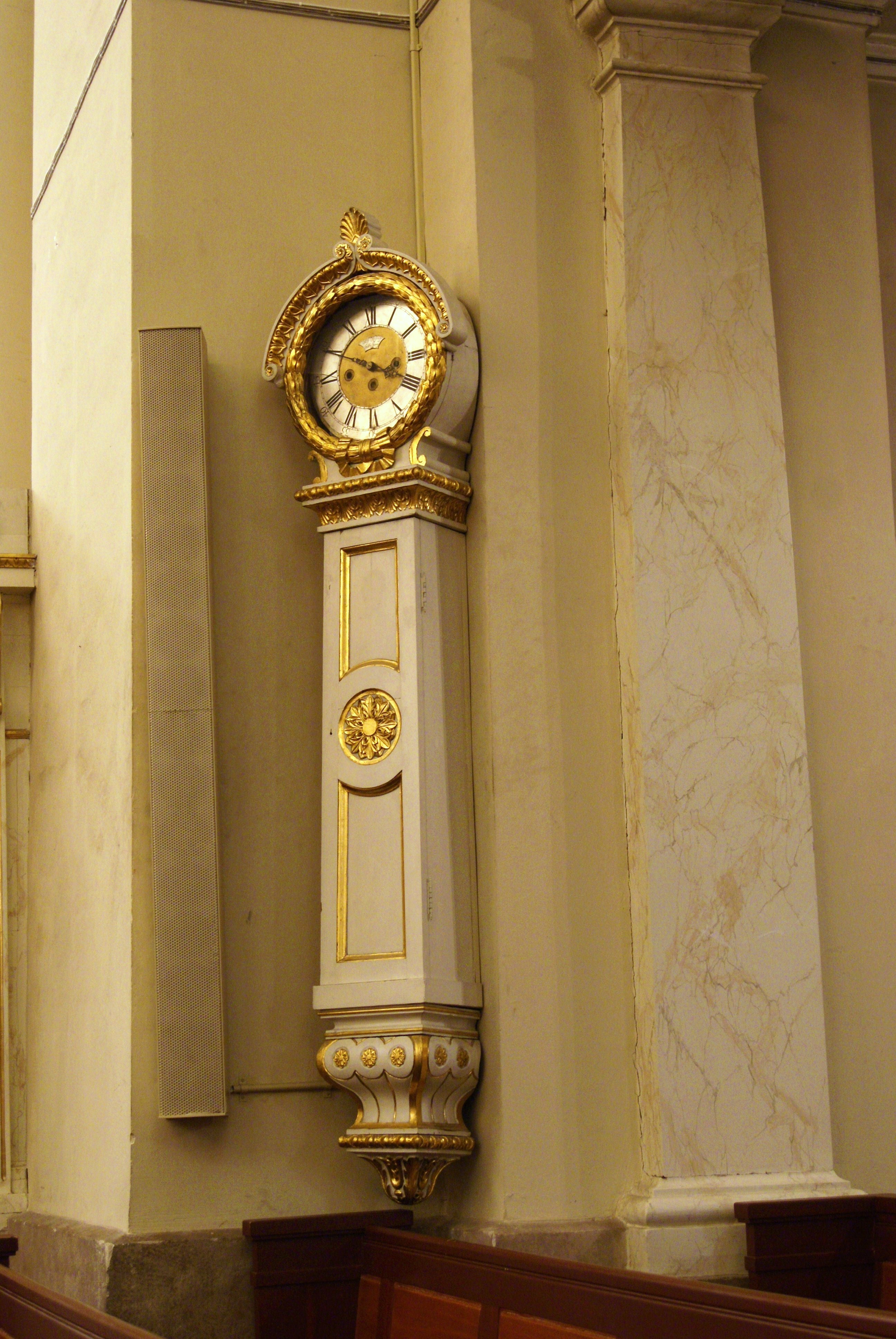
The wall clock that also survived the fire
