= Alexander Westerlund =

Swedish architect, industrial and furniture designer

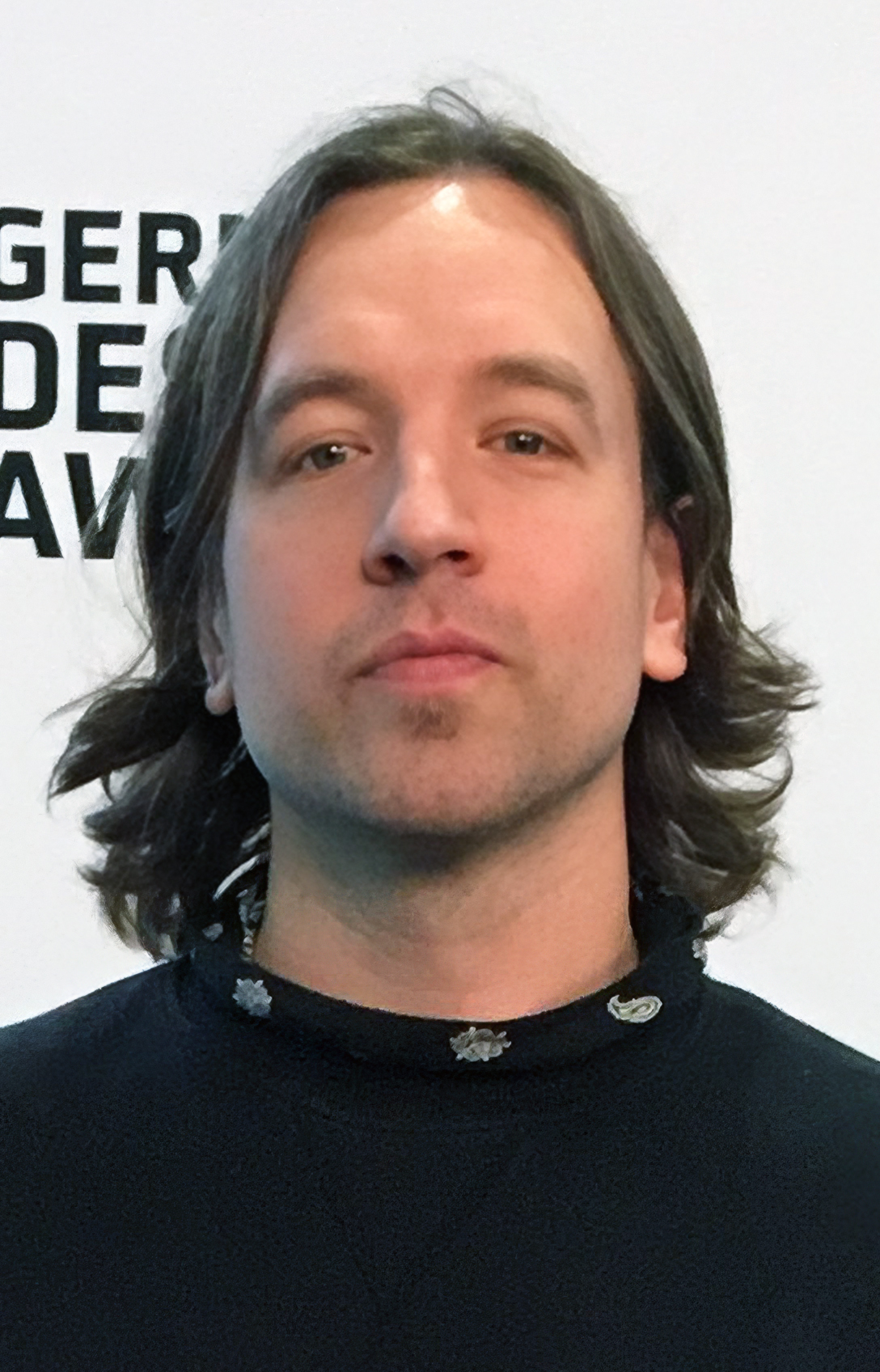
- Born: April 28, 1985 (age 41); Örgryte, Gothenburg, Sweden
- Education: Lund University
- Occupations: architect, industrial and furniture designer
- Notable work: Kelp Chair

Alexander Lorentzo R. E. Westerlund (born 28 April 1985) is a Swedish architect, industrial and furniture designer and co-founder of the Stockholm-based design studio Interesting Times Gang. His work focuses on material-driven design using recycled and bio-based materials. His Kelp Chair (2021) is held in the permanent collection of the Nationalmuseum in Stockholm.

== Early life and education ==
Westerlund was born in Örgryte, Gothenburg, Sweden. In 2013, he completed a Master’s degree in Machine Design (Maskinkonstruktion) at Lund University’s Faculty of Engineering (LTH). His degree project was carried out at the Department of Design Sciences and focused on applying industrial design methods to product development.

== Career ==
Westerlund’s work centres on experimental production methods and the use of reused and bio-based materials in furniture and interior elements. Design publications describe his work as combining industrial production methods with reused and biologically derived materials, often developed through 3D-printing experiments.

Among his works is the biophilic room divider Veggro, developed for the Scandinavian housing cooperative OBOS. Writing in Frankfurter Allgemeine Zeitung, Florian Siebeck described the project’s two variants — Loom, produced from mycelium, and Jugoso, produced using 3D-printed filament made from orange peels — as acoustic spatial elements intended for architectural interiors. Prototypes were exhibited in OBOS’s Living Lab in Oslo.

A 2023 report in Lianhe Zaobao discussed the Kelp Chair, quoting Westerlund on the use of recycled fishing nets and wood fibre in its construction. Subsequent editorial features in Tidskriften Rum examined his material experimentation and production methods, including coverage of the Kelp Chair and the installation Gläntan at Fabege’s headquarters in Solna.

In 2026, Tidskriften Rum reported on Interesting Times Gang's circular interior concept for the Ace Powerhouse project in Skellefteå and identified Westerlund as responsible interior architect and design director. The same year, Onoffice profiled Westerlund's design language in relation to the studio's work across furniture, interiors and experimental production.

Additional editorial coverage has appeared in Scandinavian and international design magazines. Reporting from the Stockholm Furniture Fair, Euronews and Dezeen discussed Westerlund’s work with 3D printing and recycled materials within contemporary sustainable design practices.

== Reception ==
Westerlund’s work has been interpreted in design journalism as part of a broader material-driven approach within contemporary furniture design, combining industrial manufacturing processes with recycled and biologically derived materials.

Writers have framed his projects less as individual products and more as investigations into production methods and material systems within architectural and interior contexts.

Academic research has similarly analysed the work within sustainable furniture production. A peer-reviewed article in ZoneModa Journal discusses the Kelp Chair in relation to contemporary design and the blending of natural and artificial materials.

== Collections ==
The Kelp Chair (2021) is held in the permanent collection of the Nationalmuseum in Stockholm. Westerlund is also listed in the collection database of the Röhsska Museum in Gothenburg.
