= Carl Wilhelm Carlberg =

Swedish architect and fortifications officer

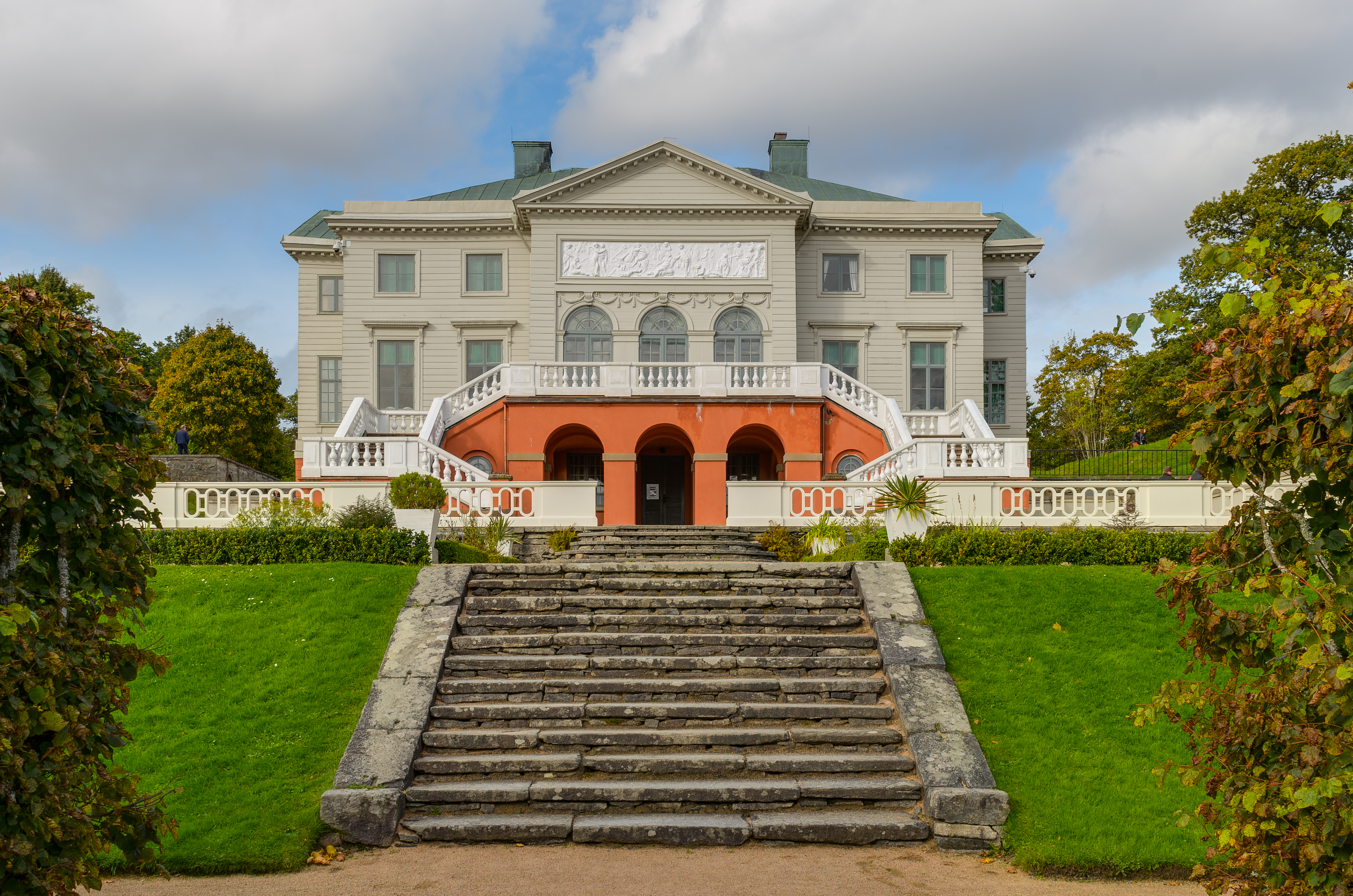
Gunnebo House

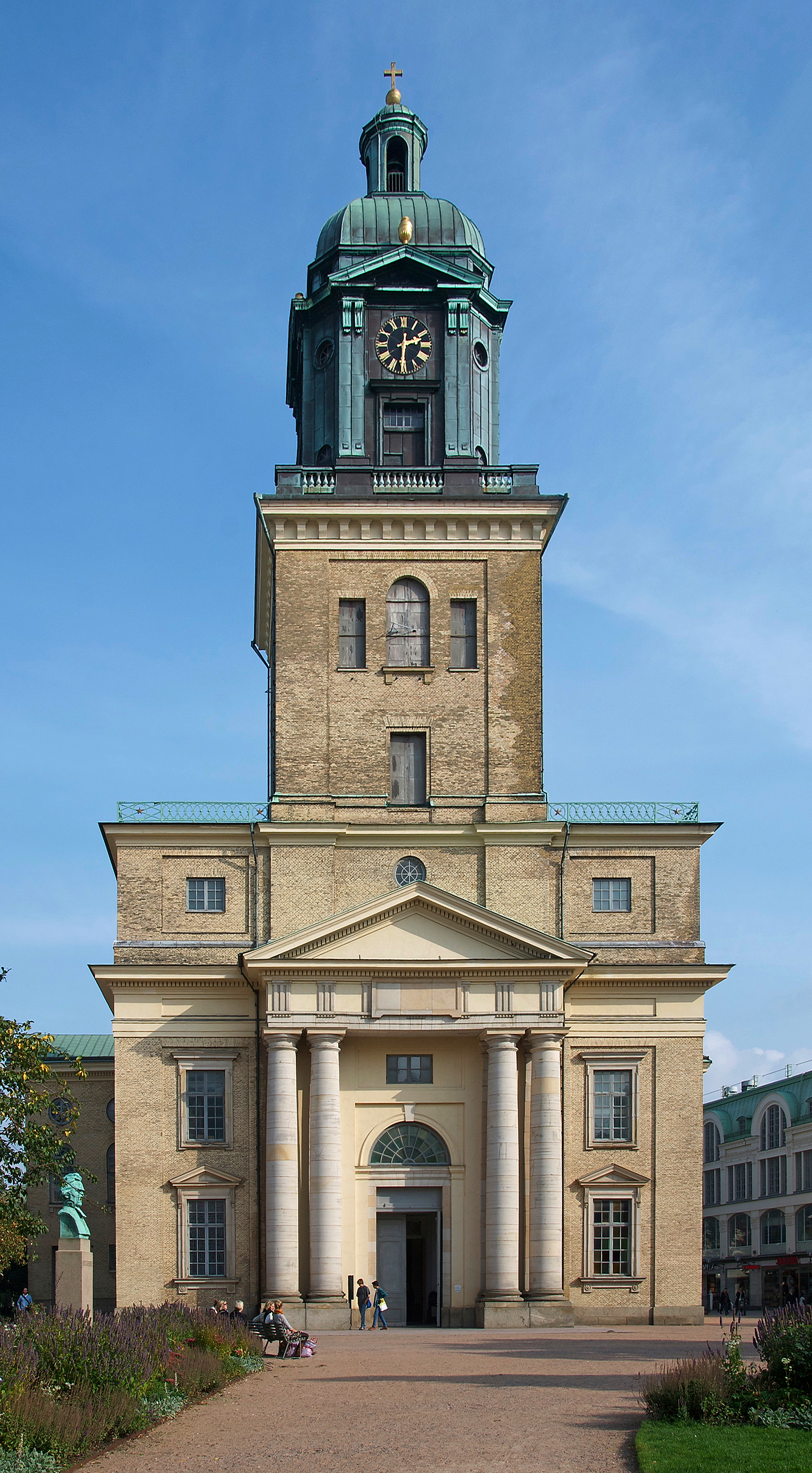
Gothenburg Cathedral, designed by Carlberg and finished after his death

Carl Wilhelm Carlberg (1746–1814) was a Swedish architect, fortifications officer, and Gothenburg's first city architect.

== Life and career ==
Carl Wilhelm Carlberg, who was born on 9 March 1746 at Örgryte and died on 8 April 1814 in Gothenburg.

He was the son of Bengt Wilhelm Carlberg during his second marriage, to Jeanna Stina Carlberg, née Blaesinghs. His uncle Johan Eberhard Carlberg was Gothenburg's first city engineer, from 1717 to 1727, and subsequently city architect in Stockholm for 45 years. The Carlberg family has a street in Gothenburg named after it, Carlbergsgatan in the area of the city called Gårda.

Like many wealthy men of his time, he undertook a grand tour of Europe in his youth, visiting France, England, Germany and Italy. The Renaissance style of Italian architect Andrea Palladio was said to make a particular impression on Carlberg.

Carlberg is maybe best remembered today as the architect of the Gunnebo House, a neoclassical mansion in Göteborg that was built for John Hall, the city's wealthiest inhabitant. The mansion is one of Sweden's best preserved 18th century estates and currently serves as a museum. The building itself is protected since 1963, while the entire estate became a cultural reserve in 2003.

He also designed the current building of the Gothenburg Cathedral, the Mariakyrkan church and several homes and trade halls that still stand today.
