= Gunnebo House =

House near Gothenburg, Sweden

Coordinates: 57°39′29″N 12°03′30″E

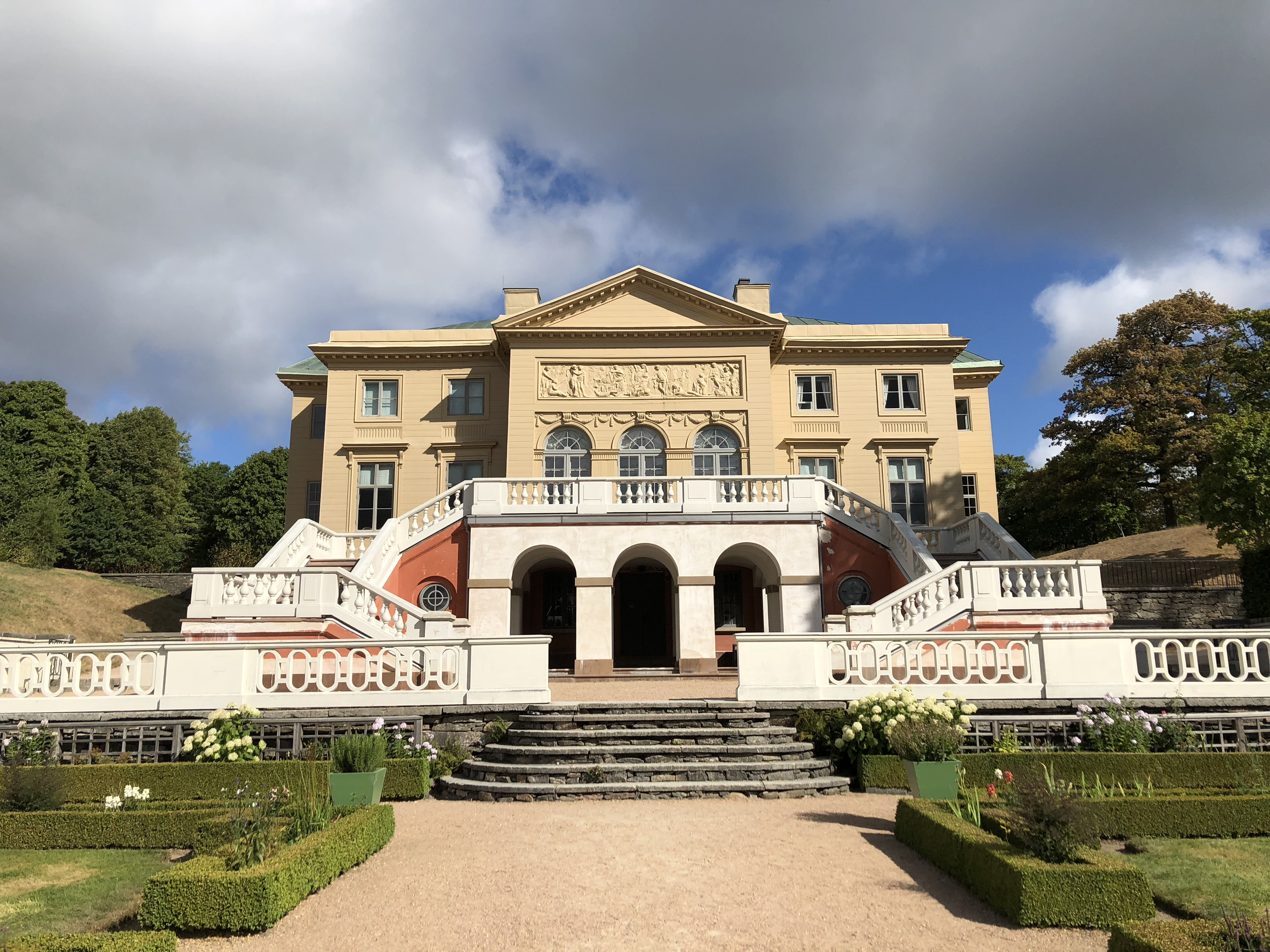
Gunnebo House, 2018

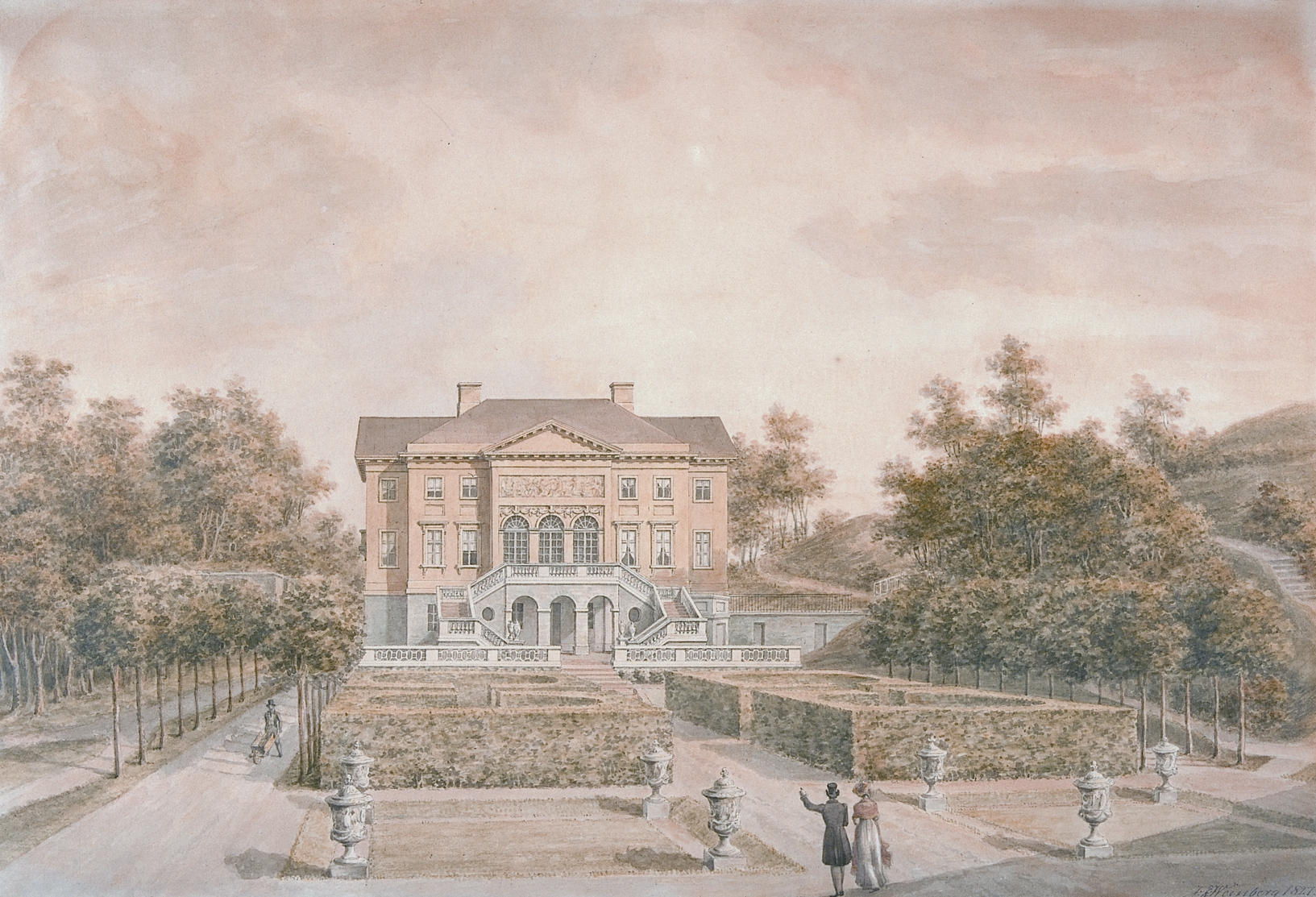
The Southern facade on a water colour by Justus Friedrich Weinberg, ca 1830.

Gunnebo House (Swedish: Gunnebo slott) is a mansion located outside Gothenburg, in Mölndal Municipality, Sweden. The main building, the garden facilities, the park and a larger outdoor area, were registered as a building monument and protected as a nature reserve in 1949.

== History ==
The estate consists of a main building from the end of the 18th century, built by merchant John Hall, and drawn by city architect Carl Wilhelm Carlberg in a Neoclassical architecture. All drawings and design plans are kept and through these, reconstructions and renovations of buildings and gardens are undergoing since the 1990s. Today, Gunnebo is one of Sweden's most complete 18th century estates.

After the death of Jon Hall in 1802, the House went to his son John Hall Junior. The son lost the family's trading business due to the recession during the Napoleonic wars and the family sold Gunnebo and all furnishings. The last private owner, baroness Hilda Sparre, died in 1948. The 18th century interior was recreated in the 1950s, when Mölndal Municipality bought the estate. Several original furniture have been brought back to Gunnebo during the 20th century. Today the House is a museum and a recreated 18th century home.

Gunnebo has one of Sweden's finest and best preserved Baroque gardens. Surrounding these is a landscape garden between the lakes Stensjön and Rådasjön. The estate is a cultural reserve since 2003 and the main building is listed since 1963.

=== Notable guests ===
Both king Gustav III of Sweden and Marie Thérèse of France visited the Hall family at Gunnebo. They also welcomed the Venezuelan revolutionary Francisco de Miranda. King Gustav V visited Hilda Sparre at the House in the early 20th century. In June 2001 guests of the EU-summit in Gothenburg, among whom U.S. President George W Bush, visited Gunnebo House.

== Today ==
The parks are open to the public and the interior of the House can be seen with a guided tour. Guided tours are offered for visitors the year around and there is also a shop and a restaurant. Every summer, an open-air theatre is held in the gardens.

== Gallery ==
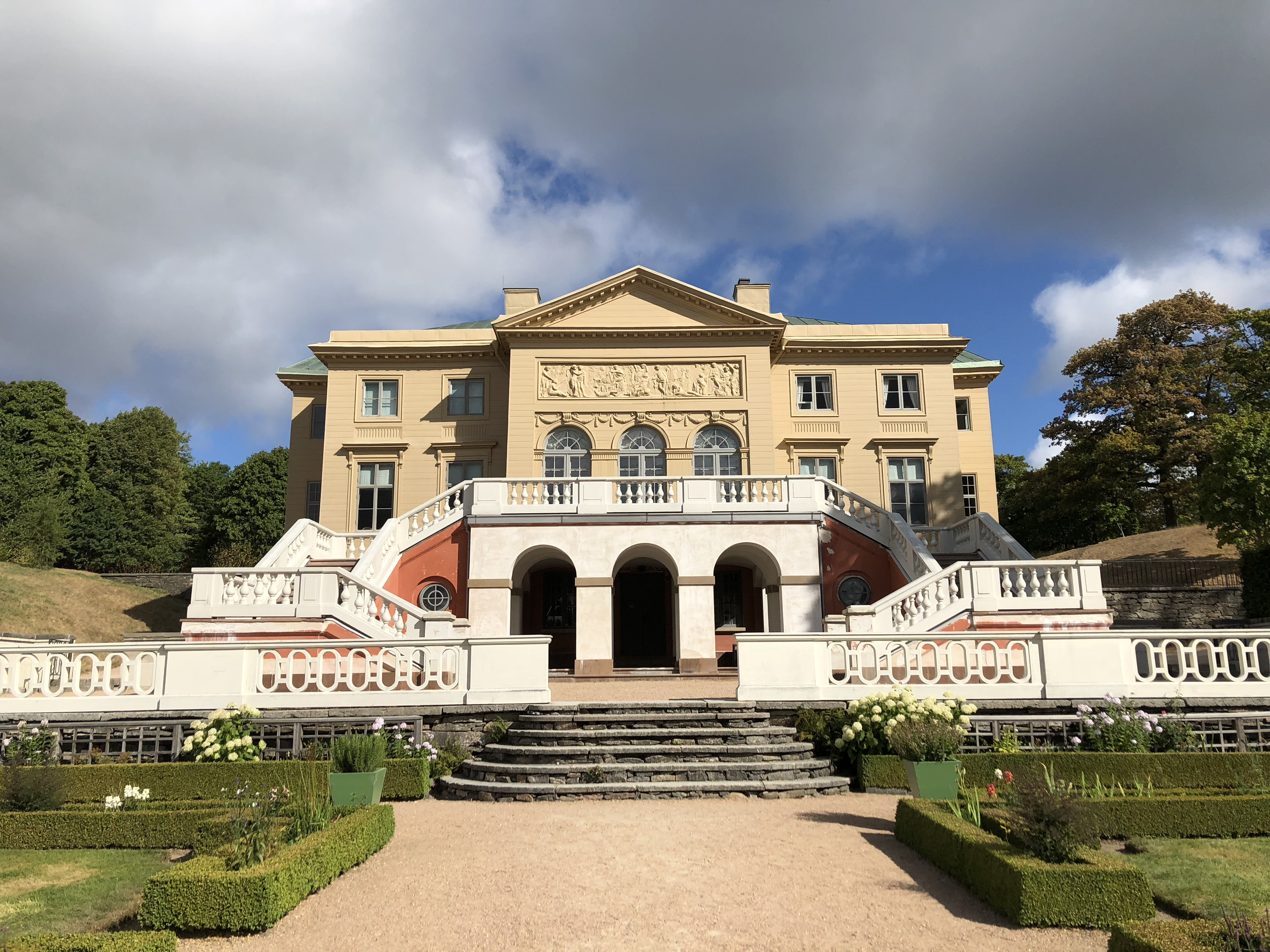
The Southern facade of the House in 2018

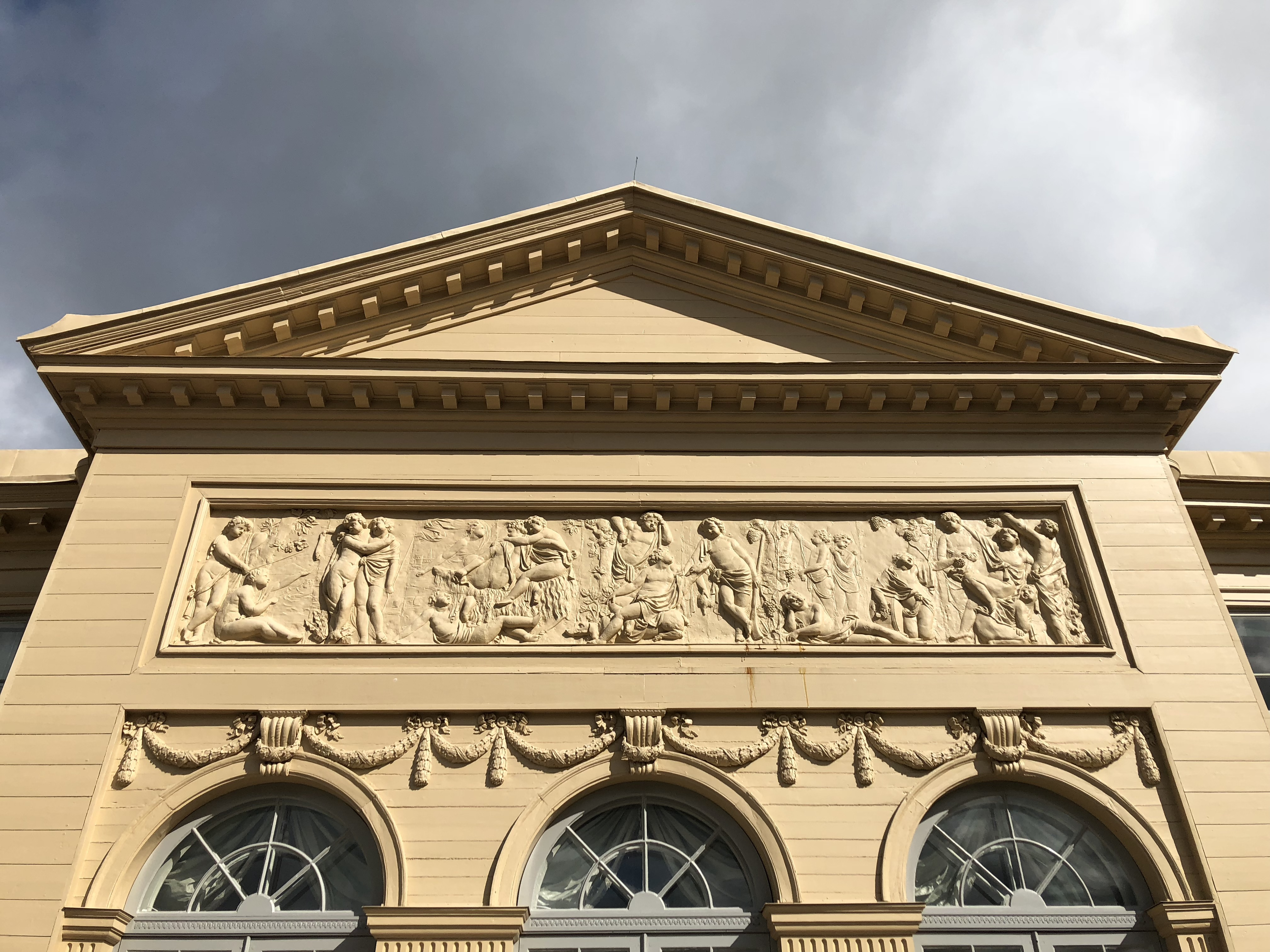
The south façade with its frieze and tympanon.

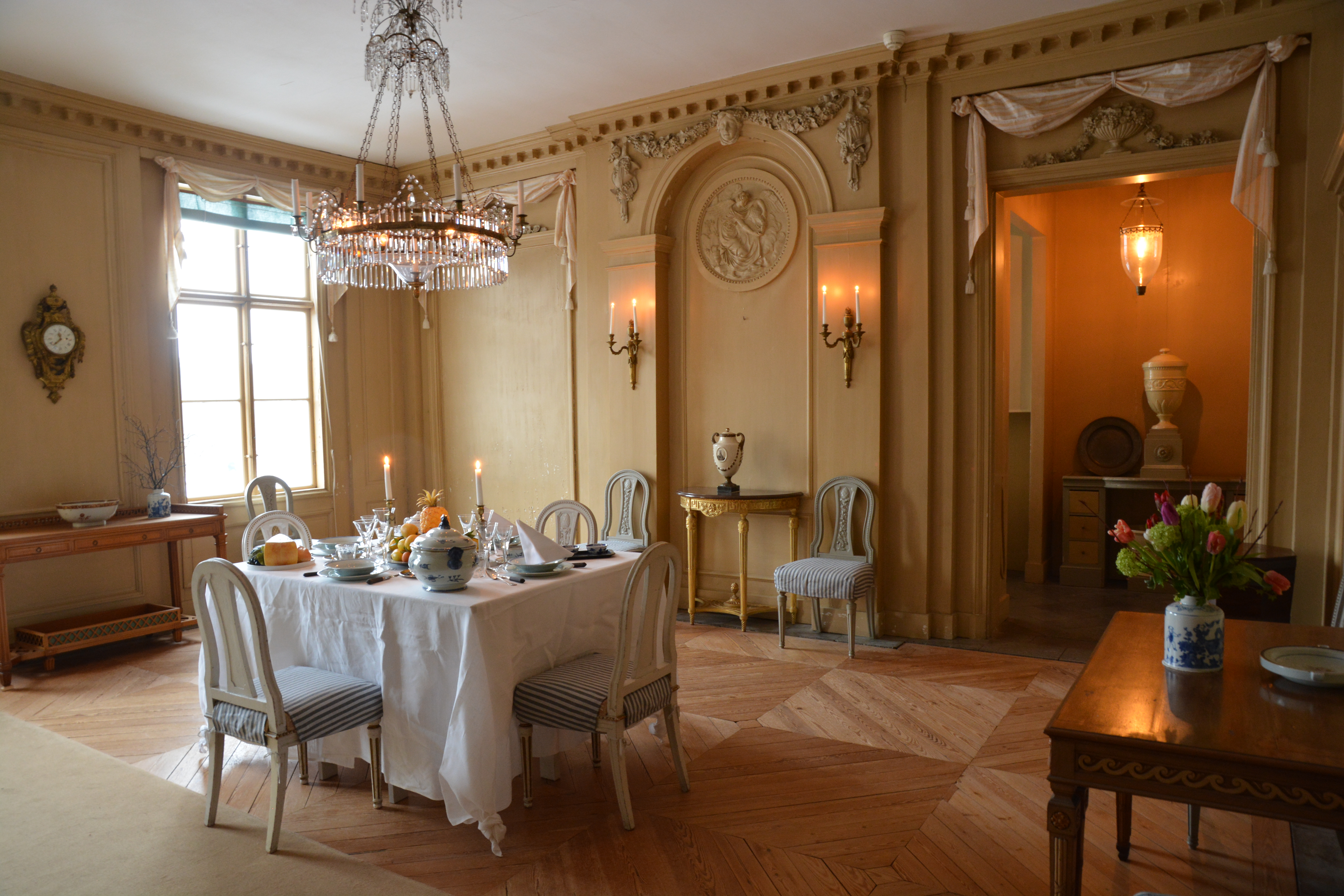
The Dining Room of the House

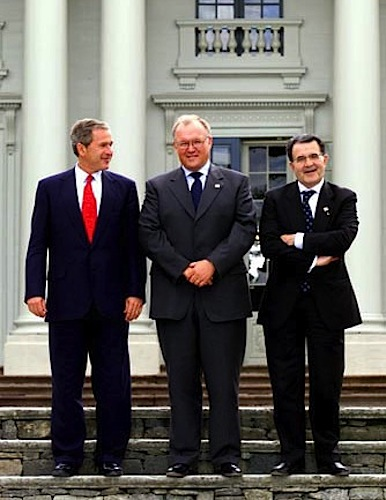
U.S. President George W. Bush, Swedish Prime Minister Göran Persson and President of the European Commission Romano Prodi at Gunnebo House, June 14, 2001.

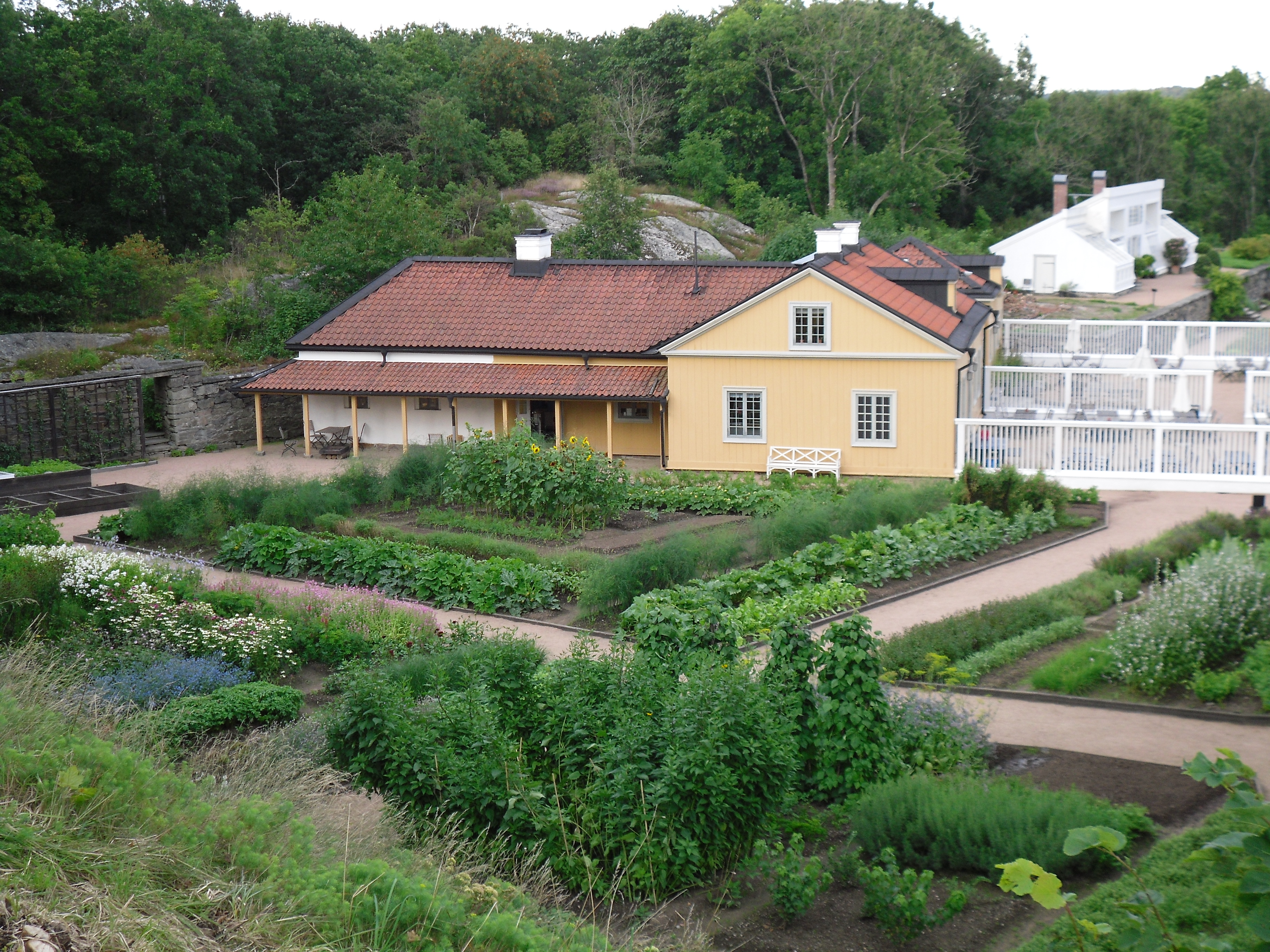
The servants' quarters, now coffee house and restaurant.

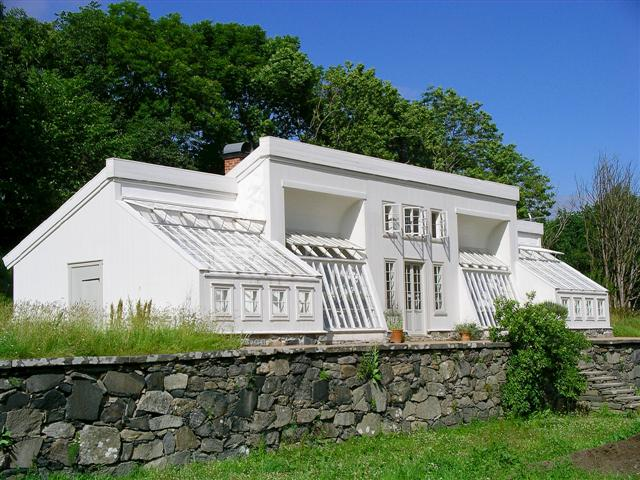
The Greenhouse

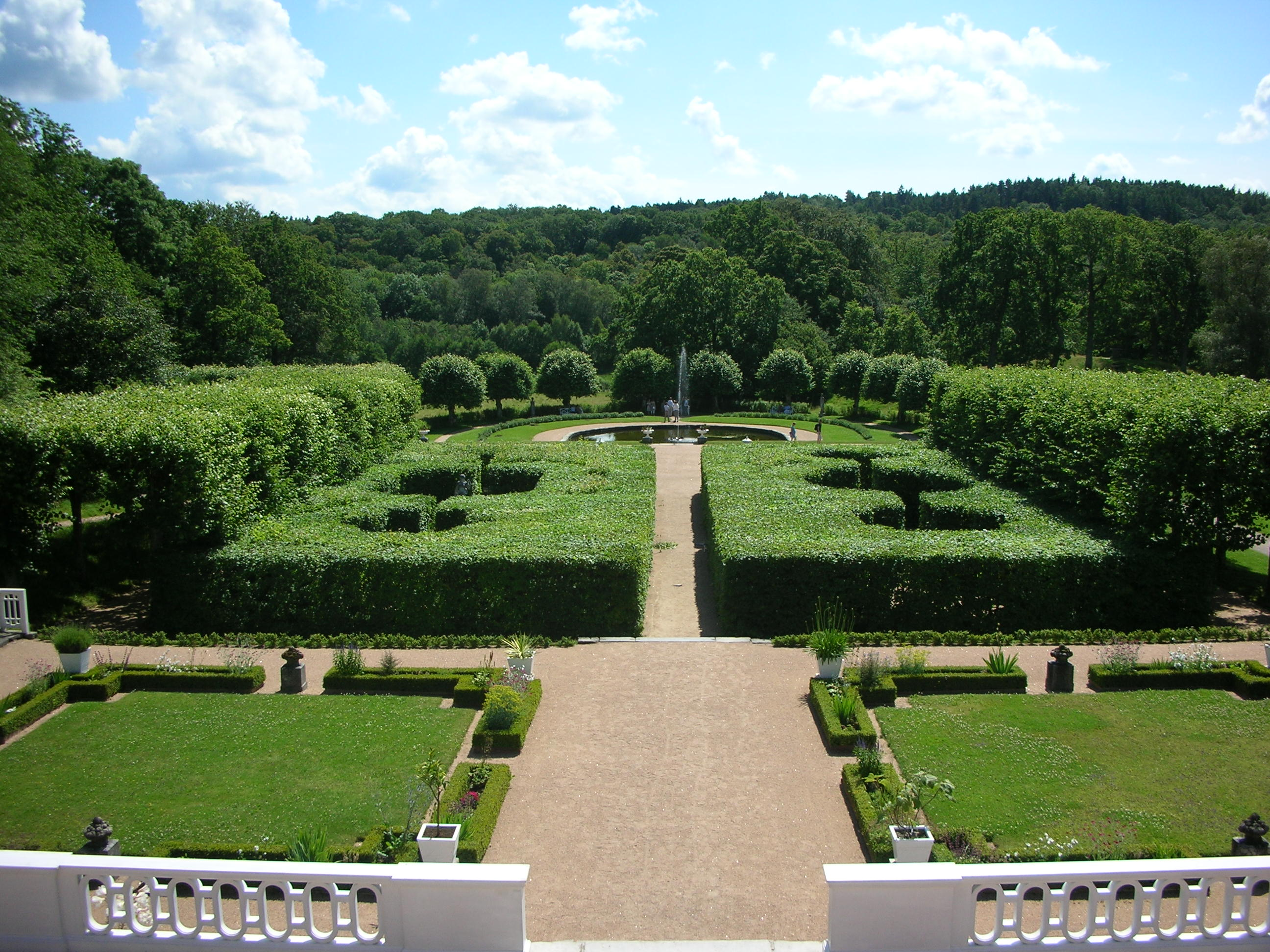
The Southern gardens

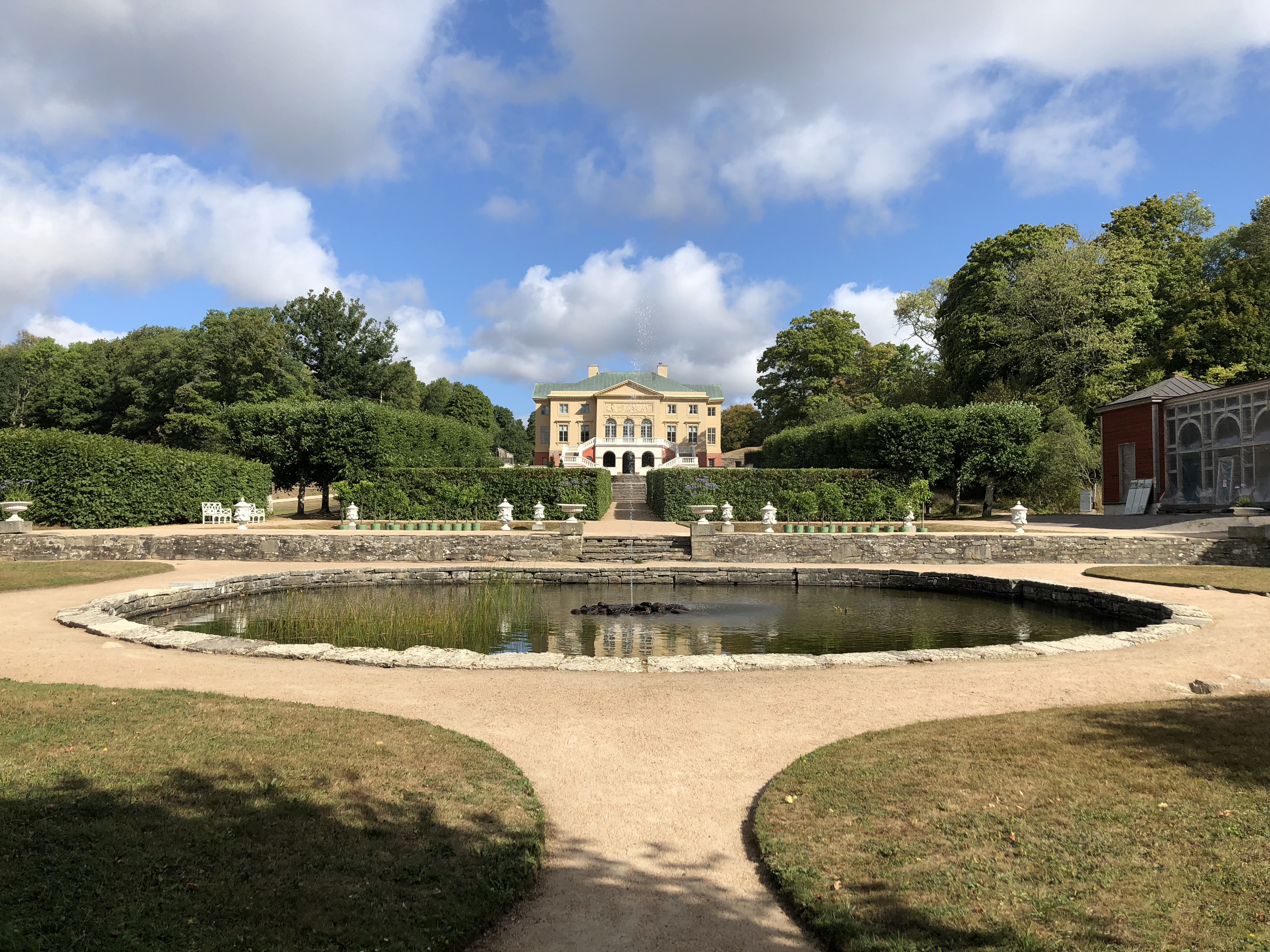
The Southern gardens

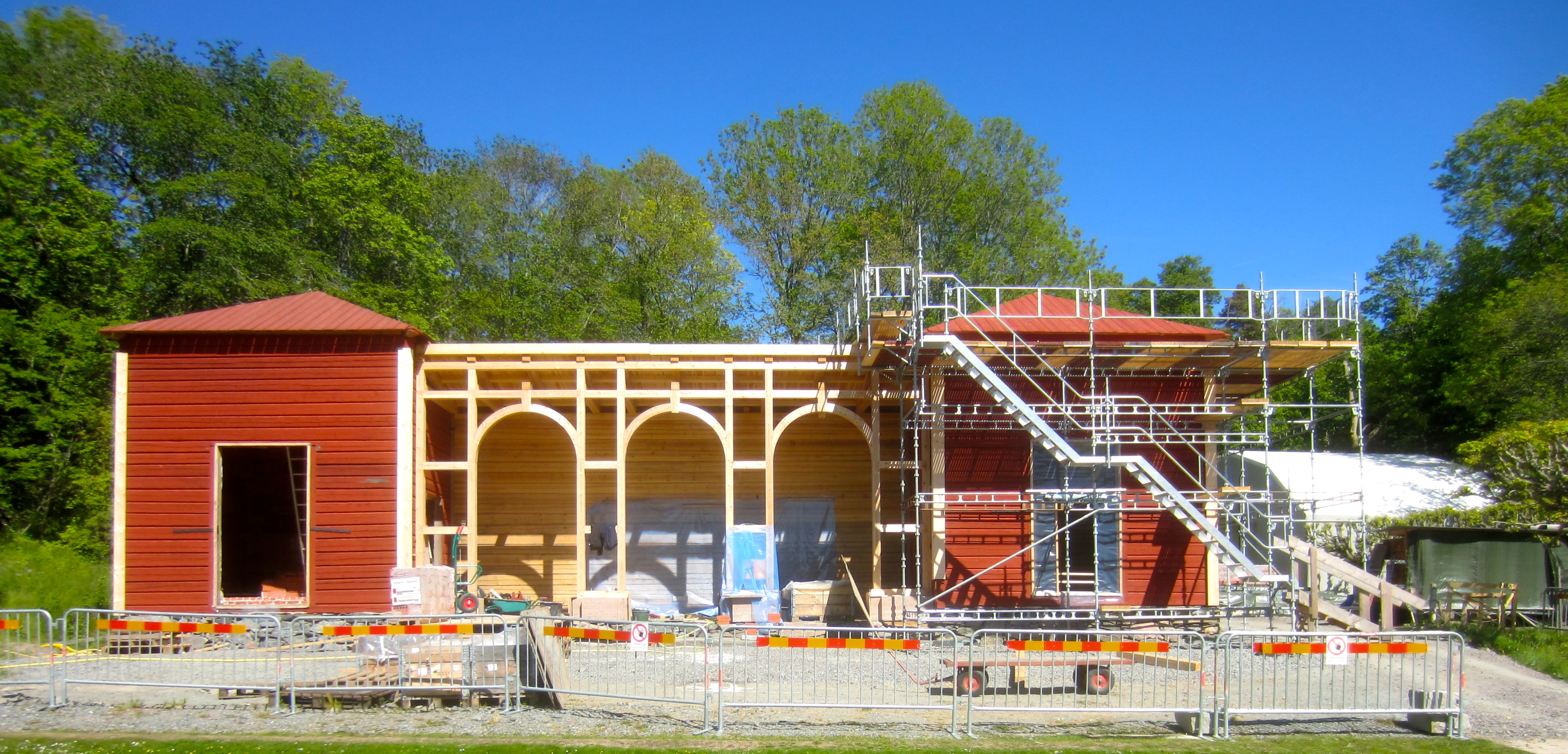
The orangery under construction, summer 2015.

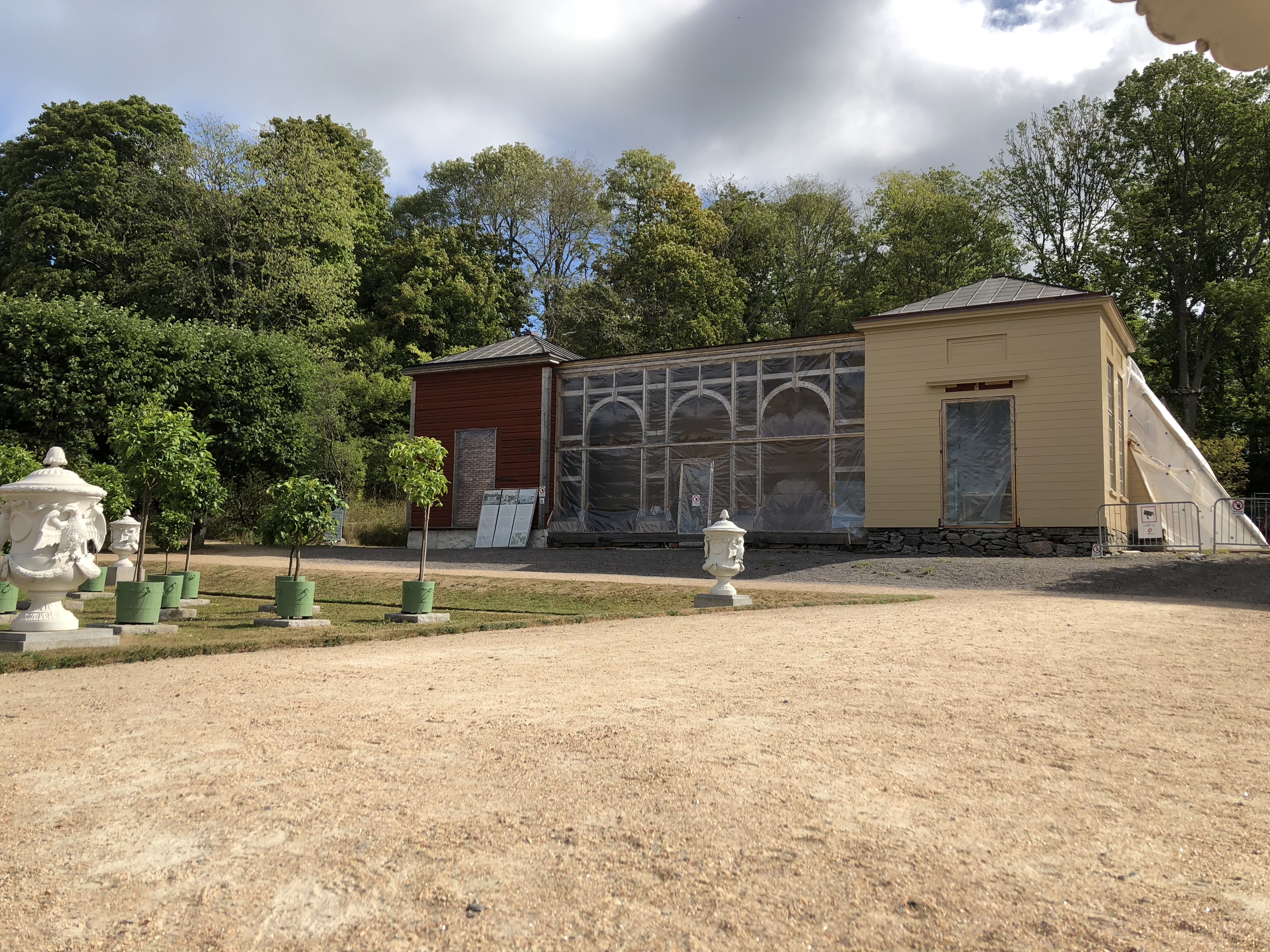
The orangery under construction, summer 2018.

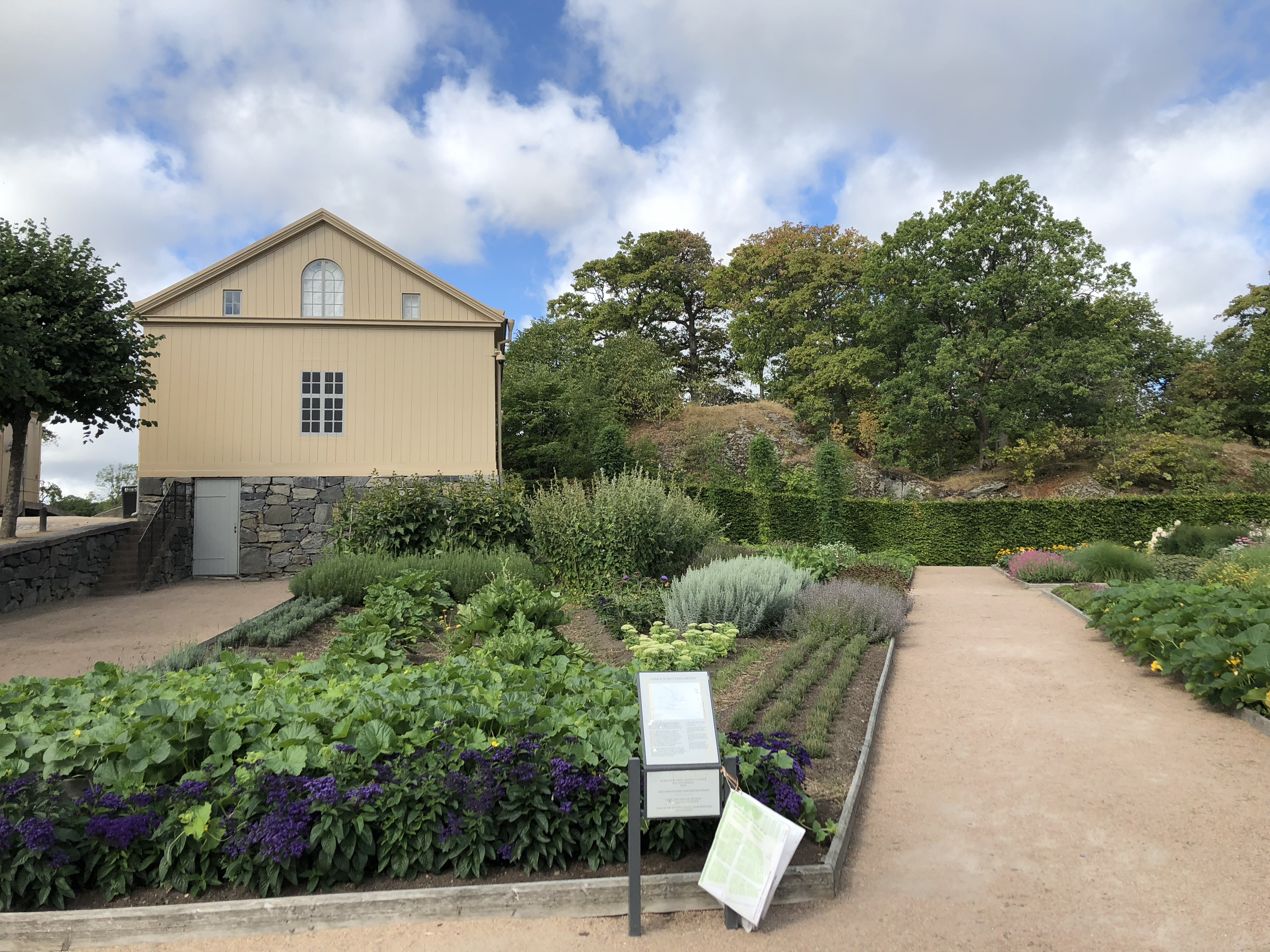
Kitchen gardens

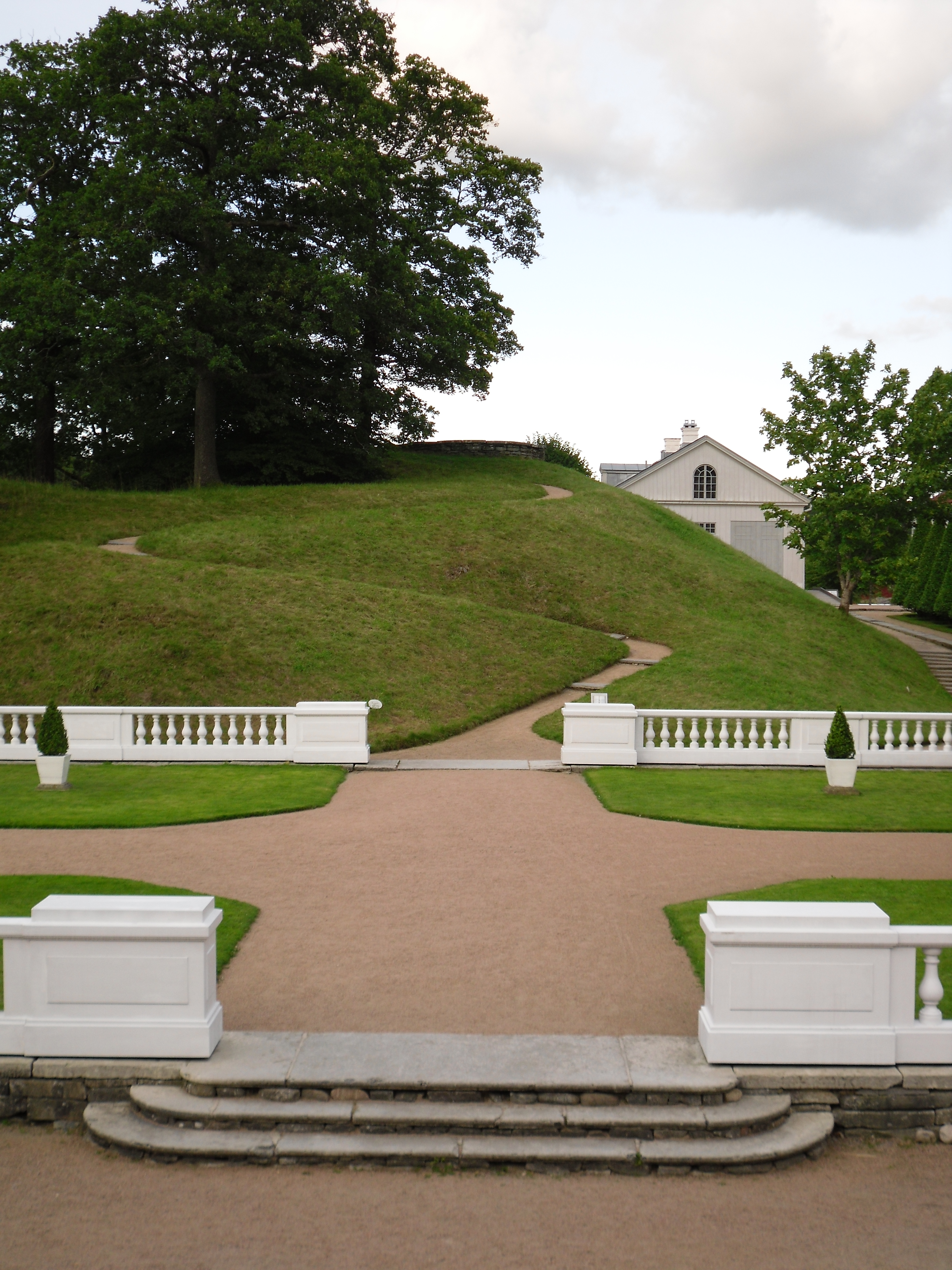
The gardens, Flora's Hill.
