= Kelp Chair =

Chair designed by Alexander Westerlund

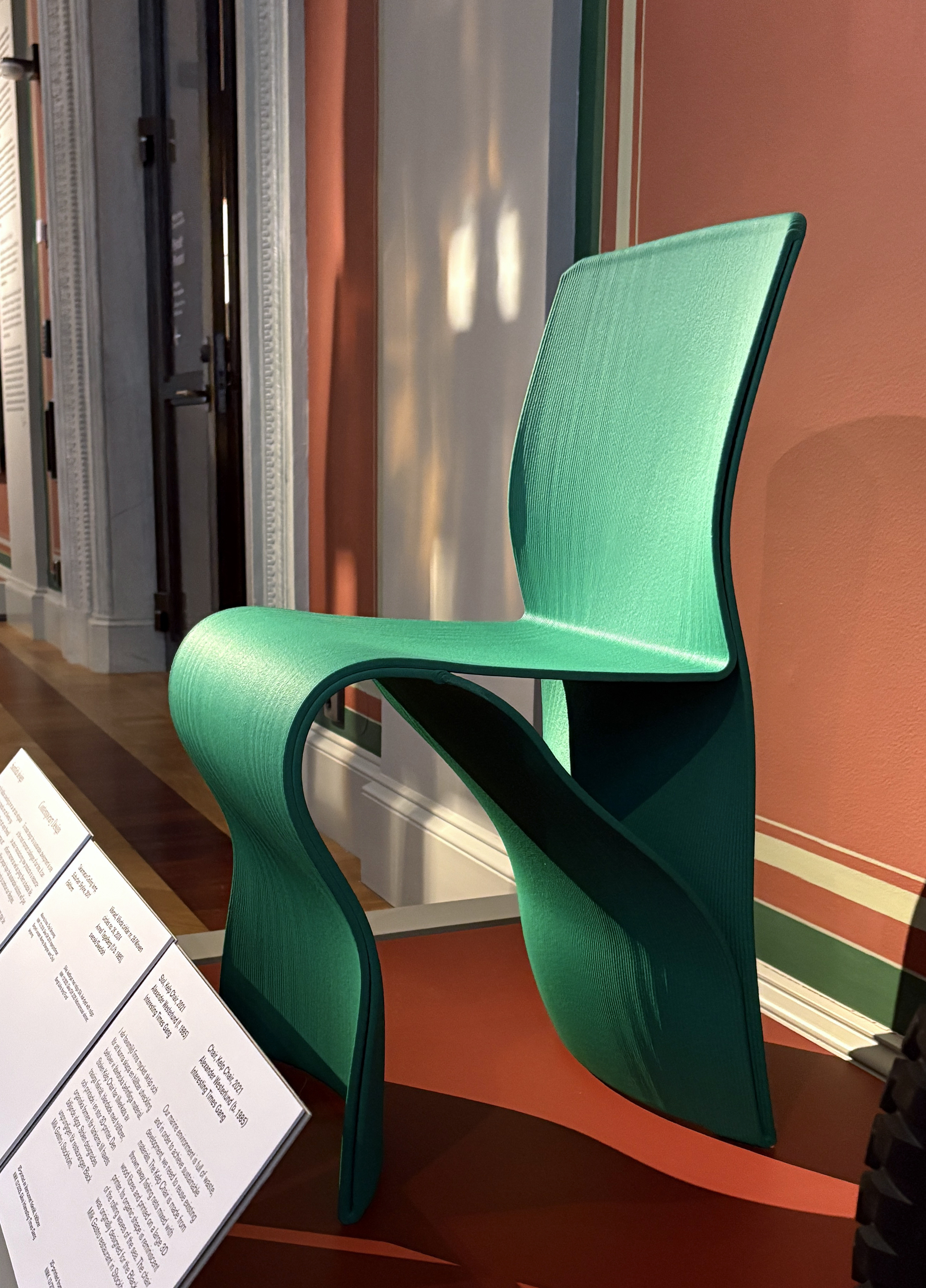
- Designer: Alexander Westerlund
- Date: 2021
- Made in: Sweden
- Materials: Recycled fishing-net plastic, wood fibre
- Height: 84 cm (33 in)
- Width: 40 cm (16 in)
- Depth: 50 cm (20 in)
- Collection: Nationalmuseum, Röhsska Museum

The Kelp Chair is a chair designed by Alexander Westerlund in 2021 and developed with Interesting Times Gang. Made from recycled fishing net plastic and wood fibre using large-scale 3D printing, the chair was originally designed for Black Milk Gastro Bar in Stockholm, Sweden.

The chair is part of the collections of the Nationalmuseum in Stockholm and the Röhsska Museum in Gothenburg, and won a German Design Award in 2024.

== Design ==
The chair originated as a design for Black Milk Gastro Bar, a Stockholm restaurant project by chefs Niclas Jönsson and Daniel Höglander.

The chair is made from recycled fishing-net plastic and wood fibre and formed through large-scale 3D printing. The fishing nets are from Scandinavian waters, and the chair's material includes bio-based composite. The chair is 84 cm × 40 cm × 50 cm (33 in × 16 in × 20 in) and weighs approximately 10 kg (22 lb).

The chair's curved form references kelp and other marine vegetation. Westerlund told Lianhe Zaobao that the shape was based on the movement of kelp in water. The chair's curved form contributes to its structural strength.

The chair's material can be ground down and reused in later production.

== Development and exhibitions ==
The Kelp Collection was first exhibited publicly during Stockholm Design Week in 2022 and was subsequently shown at the London Design Festival and Grand Designs Live in Birmingham, where it was selected for Kevin McCloud's Green Heroes showcase.

In 2023, the Kelp Chair was presented at the Stockholm Furniture Fair, where Sight Unseen included it among its selections from the fair.

For Milan Design Week in 2024, Interesting Times Gang developed a version of the chair using a biocomposite incorporating Nordic sugar kelp. The version was presented in the Is One Life Enough? exhibition at Lampo as part of the Isola Design Festival.

At the 2025 Stockholm Furniture Fair, Interesting Times Gang introduced new colours and biomaterials for the Kelp Collection under the title Memories of Marrakech. In April, the Kelp Chair was selected for Weaving the Future: 2025 Sustainable Design Exhibition at Tianfu Design Industrial Park in Chengdu, China. The exhibition formed part of a sustainable-design programme launched by Red Dot Design Museum Xiamen.

In 2026, a limited-edition version titled Kelp Chair – Iridescent, developed with Finnish material company Shimber, was presented at Stockholm Creative Edition. In July, the Kelp Collection was included in Design for the Real World: 10th Anniversary of the Sustainable Development Goals at the Fosun Art Center in Shanghai, an exhibition co-initiated by Red Dot Design Museum Xiamen.

== Awards and recognition ==
In 2022, the Kelp Chair was longlisted in the Seating Design category of the Dezeen Awards. The same year, House & Garden included the Kelp Chair in its Design 100 list.

The chair won the German Design Award in the Excellent Product Design – Furniture category in 2024. It also received a Silver award in the Seating & Comfort Furniture – Chair category of the 2024 NY Product Design Awards, a Green Good Design award, and a BIG SEE Product Design Award in the Home and Living category.

The Kelp Chair was a finalist in the 2024 Seoul Design Award and was named an honoree in the Residential Seating category of Interior Design magazine's 2024 Best of Year Awards. The Kelp Collection also received a Good Design Awards in the Furniture category.

== Reception ==
In 2024, Tidskriften Rum suggested that the Kelp Chair could be regarded as a modern classic.

In 2025, a peer-reviewed article in ZoneModa Journal discussed the chair in relation to sustainable furniture design and the combination of natural and artificial materials.

== Collections ==
The Kelp Chair is represented in the collections of the Nationalmuseum and the Röhsska Museum in Gothenburg, Sweden. As of September 2026, Nationalmuseum lists it as displayed in Room 1403 of the Västra galleriet.
