= Gothenburg stave church =

Church building in Gothenburg, Sweden

Coordinates: 57°42′16″N 11°57′52″E

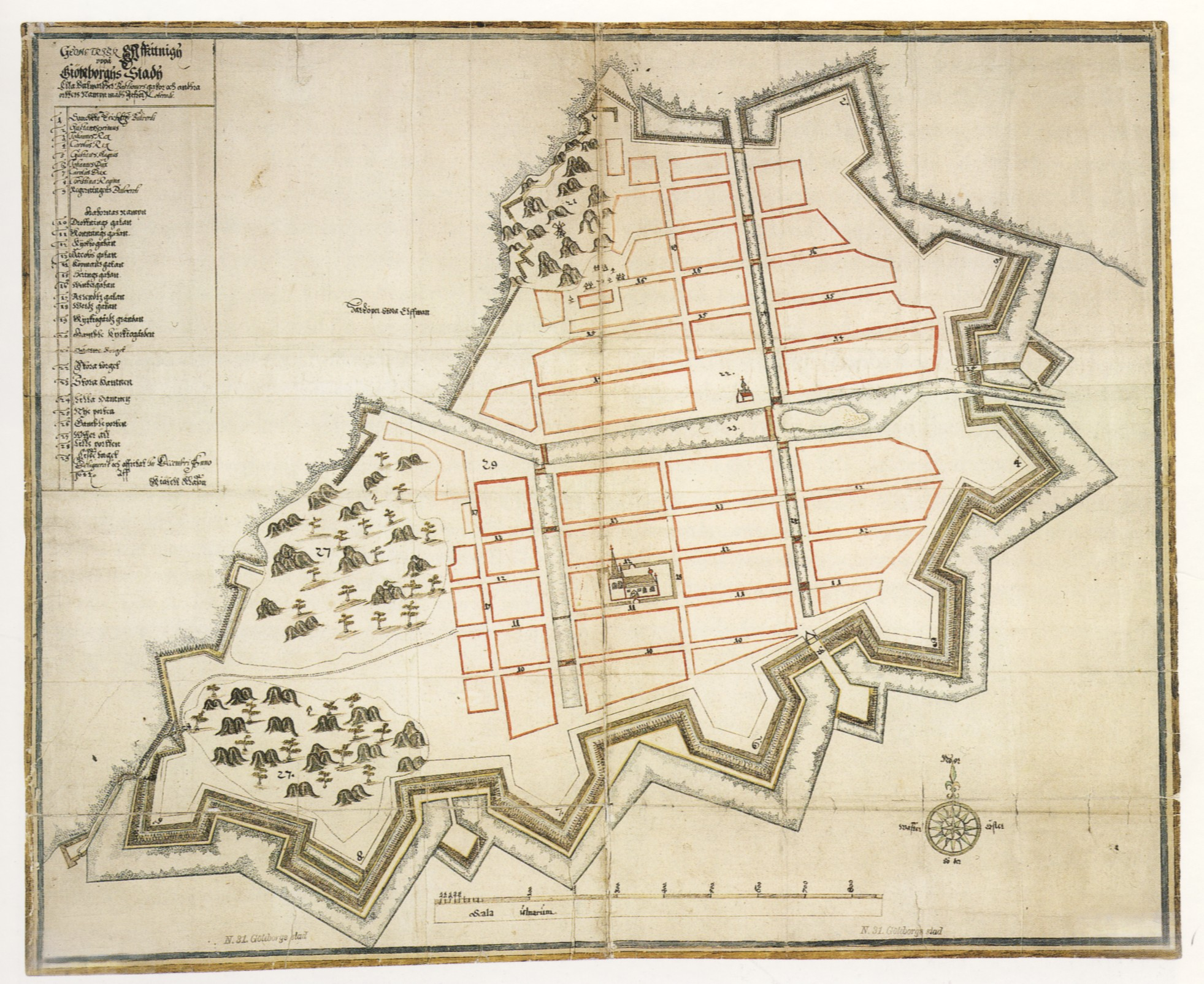
Early plan of the settlement of Gothenburg (1644). By the time of this map, the former stave church had already been replaced with the first cathedral, depicted near the middle.

The stave church of Gothenburg (Swedish: Brädekyrkan i Göteborg) was Gothenburg's first church building and one of its first buildings constructed since its city plan was drawn up. Completed in 1621 on one of the city's first five blocks, bounded by the streets Kungsgatan, Västra Hamngatan, Kyrkogatan and Korsgatan, the stave church stood on the same plot now occupied by Gothenburg Cathedral. The church was intended from the outset to be temporary.

From July 26, 1619, the pastor and state-appointed superintendent of Gothenburg was Sylvester Johannis Phrygius (d. 1628), formerly the pastor and superintendent of Skövde.

The church steeple was in the middle of the block adjacent to Kungsgatan (near the Kungsgatan entrance, through an iron fence, to today's cathedral square). Narrower than the main building, the bell tower stood along the southwest corner of the stave church. It was capped with a small cupola and pointed spire. The stave church and tower are depicted on the oldest known drawing of the then new city of Gothenburg. The gable-roofed wooden church was about 16 metres long by 12 metres wide. Two extensions were recorded, likely a choir and an entry porch, the latter intended as a place for visitors to leave their weapons before entering the church proper.

Never intended as a permanent structure, the site plan called for the wooden church to be offset from the planned location of the eventual cathedral. Superintendent Anders Prytz consecrated the new cathedral on August 10, 1633, and the stave church was disassembled shortly thereafter. The separate bell tower, however, remained in use, even serving as a municipal guard tower for the City guard until 1643, when the cathedral tower was finished in and the old tower was finally demolished.

== Other sources ==
- Albert Lilienberg, Stadsbildningar och stadsplaner i Göta älvs mynningsområde ("Pictures and town plans from the Göta estuary region", 1923), pp. 178. 180.
