= Landala =

Urban district in Gothenburg, Sweden

Coordinates: 57°41′32″N 11°58′24″E

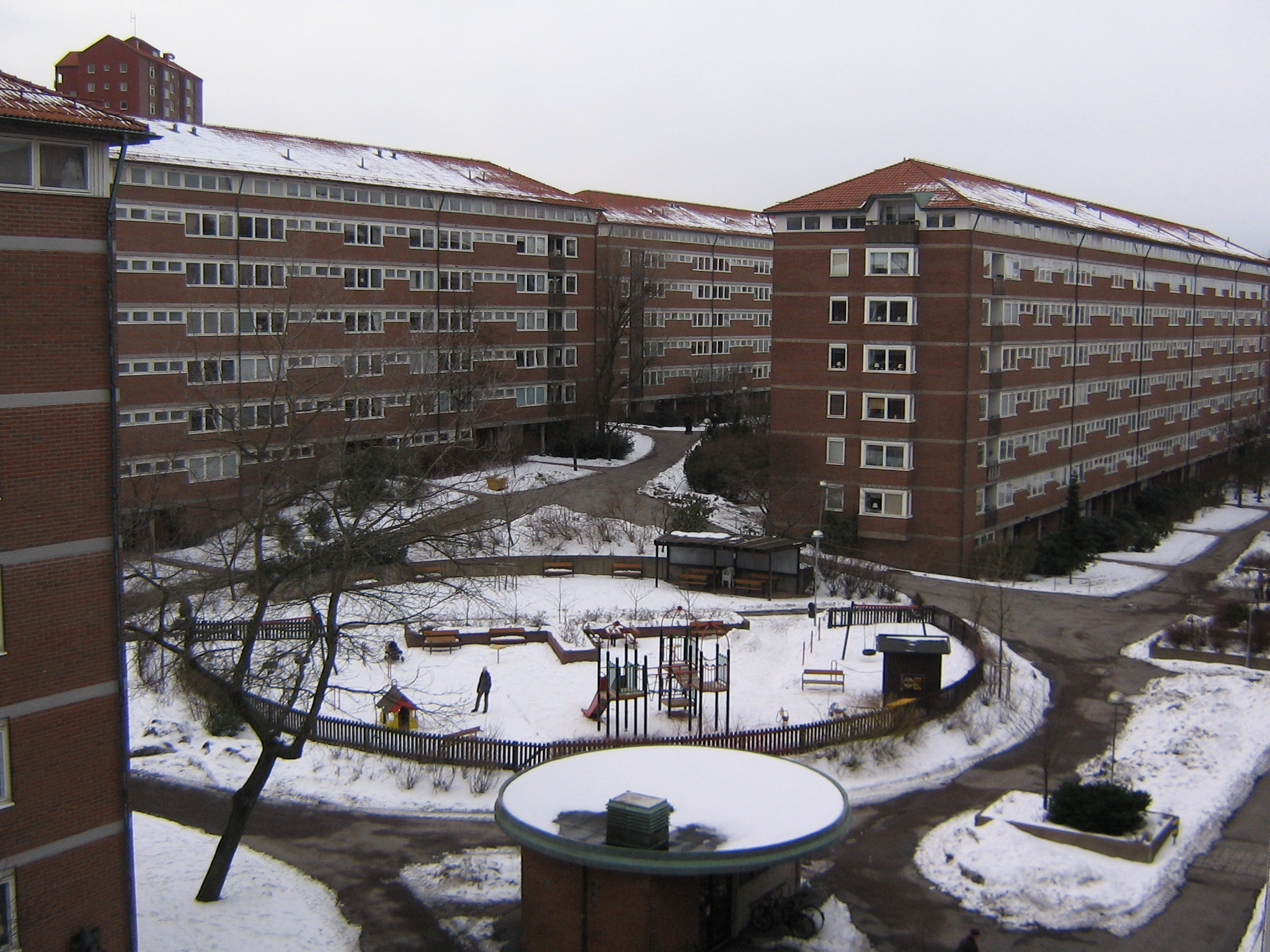
High rise buildings of Landalabergen in Landala

Landala is a district in central Gothenburg, Sweden with about 4,500 inhabitants (2005). Originally a traditional labour district with a large poorhouse, today Landala is home to some important educational institutes in Western Sweden, such as Chalmers University of Technology, Hvitfeldtska gymnasiet and Vasa Komvux. Also LGA has its origin in Landala.

Landala is also famous for its housing projects and social engineering in the 1960s. Almost the whole area was demolished (a church was moved some 100 metres (110 yd) and concrete apartment blocks were built instead. However, some single houses from the 19th century were spared.
