= FX (magazine) =

FX is a UK bi-monthly trade magazine and website for the contract interior design industry, published by GlobalData. It has an ABC audited circulation of 15,055. The editor is Emily Martin.

== History and profile ==
FX was founded in 1991. Janine Furness is the launch editor. It was published by ETP. The magazine organises and promotes the annual FX Awards for contract designers and design projects, which are recognised by the Design Council as the leading awards for the contract interior design industry. The magazine is published on a bi-monthly basis.
