= Örgryte =

Urban area of Gothenburg, Sweden

Coordinates: 57°42′0″N 12°0′0″E

Örgryte is one of the 21 stadsdelsnämndsområden (a kind of district often translated as borough) of Gothenburg Municipality, Sweden. It is a largely upper middle class residential area just to the east of the city centre. It had a population of 20,979 in 2025 and 16,175 in 2015.

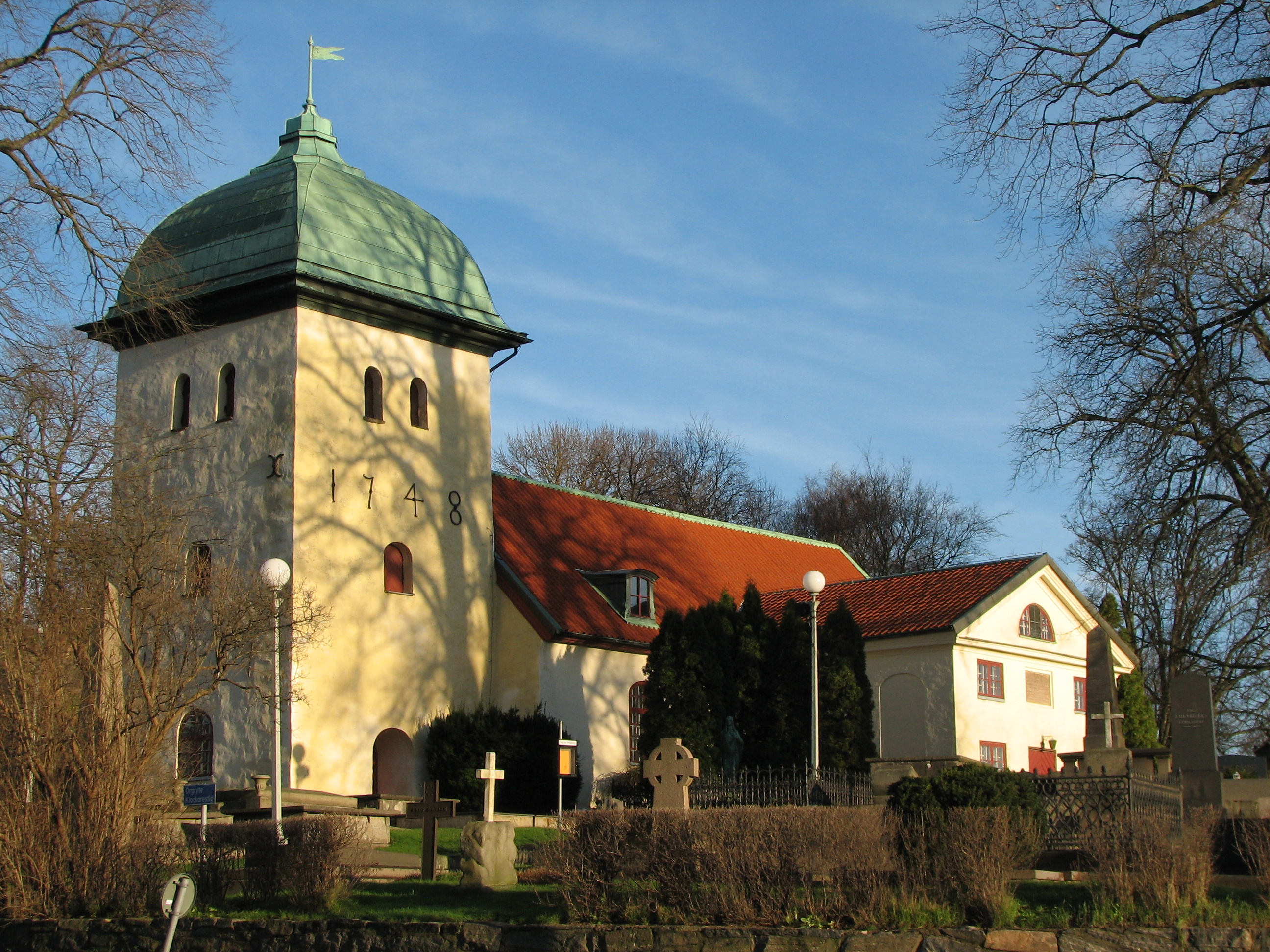
The Church of Örgryte

== History ==
The original village of Örgryte is much older than the city of Göteborg, with construction in the area predating Göteborg. The original parish being much larger was subsequently absorbed by the city in a gradual process lasting from 1882 to 1922. Construction in the area predates the surrounding areas. The name Örgryte likely originates from the presence of several giant's kettles (jättegryt lit. giant's gryt in Swedish) in the area.

== Notable people from Örgryte ==
- Ricky Bruch, 1972 Olympic bronze medallist in the discus throw
- Elena Paparizou, winner of the Eurovision Song Contest 2005, representing Greece
- Alexander Westerlund, architect, industrial and furniture designer

== See also ==
- Örgryte IS, football club based in Örgryte
