= Onoffice =

UK magazine

OnOffice
- Cover of issue 168 (Autumn 2024)
- Editor: Kaye Preston
- Categories: Architecture & Design
- Frequency: Quarterly
- Circulation: 15,752
- Founded: 2006
- Company: Media 10
- Country: United Kingdom
- Language: English
- Website: onoffice
- ISSN: 1752-6264

OnOffice is a quarterly architecture and design magazine launched in 2006 by publishing director Daren Newton, with a particular focus on the workplace, hospitality, and education sectors. It features news, criticism and case studies on architecture, interior and product design for the commercial industry.

OnOffice is owned by Media 10 LTD. The current editor is Kaye Preston.

OnOffice is part of a wider Media 10 publication and event portfolio that includes ICON, The Clerkenwell Post, Clerkenwell Design Week and Design London.

== Notes ==
In May 2013, the London Evening Standard quoted OnOffice features editor Jenny Brewer by Kate Burnett.
