= Stenungsund Municipality =

Stenungsund Municipality Stenungsunds kommun
- Municipality
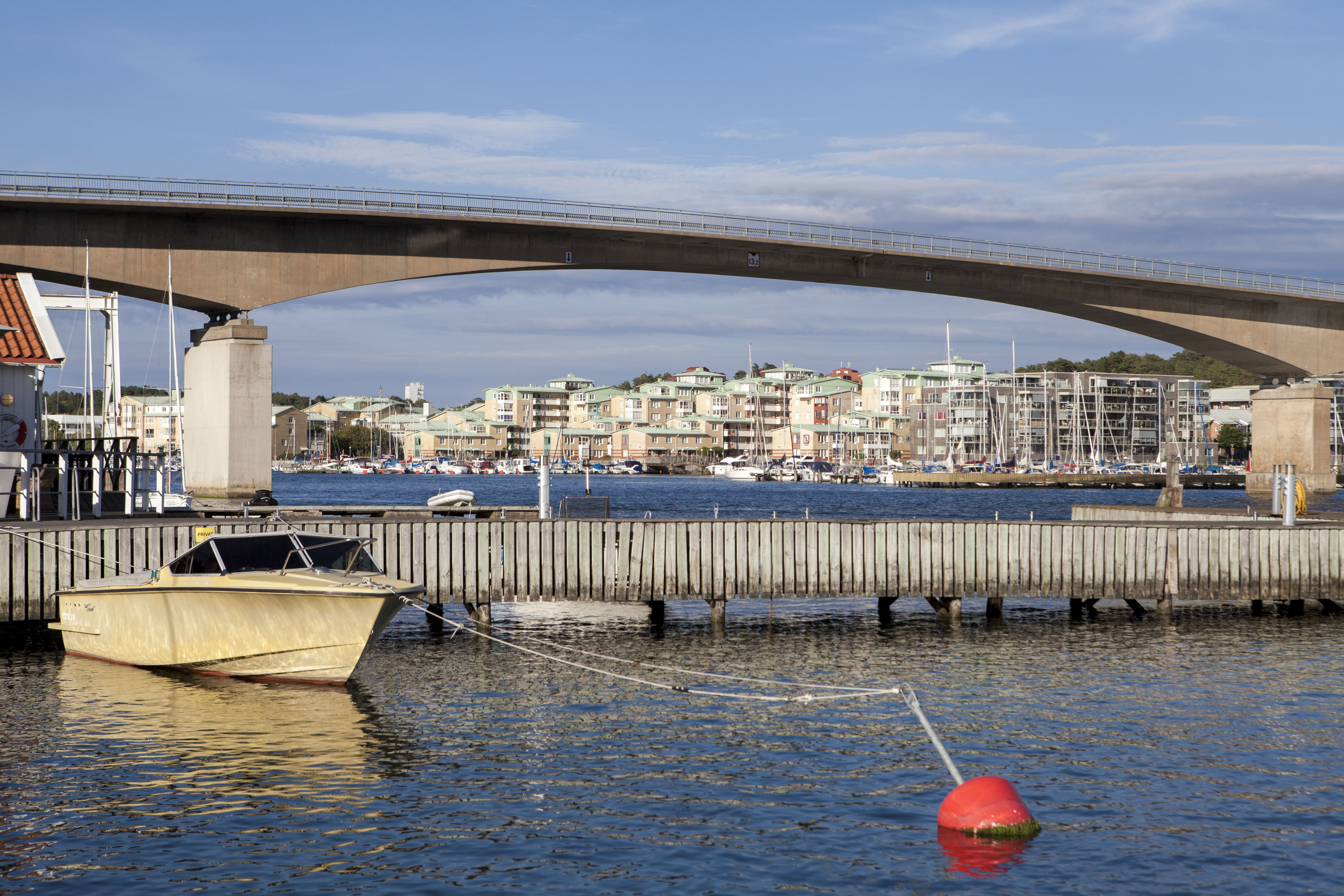

- Coat of arms

- Coordinates: 58°05′N 11°49′E
- Country: Sweden
- County: Västra Götaland County
- Seat: Stenungsund

Area
  - Total: 301.09 km^{2} (116.25 sq mi)
  - Land: 251.91 km^{2} (97.26 sq mi)
  - Water: 49.18 km^{2} (18.99 sq mi)
- Area as of 1 January 2014.

Population (30 June 2025)
  - Total: 27,971
  - Density: 111.04/km^{2} (287.58/sq mi)
- Time zone: UTC+1 (CET)
  - Summer (DST): UTC+2 (CEST)
- ISO 3166 code: SE
- Province: Bohuslän
- Municipal code: 1415
- Website: www.stenungsund.se

Stenungsund Municipality (Swedish: Stenungsunds kommun) is a municipality in Västra Götaland County in western Sweden. Its seat is located in the town of Stenungsund. The municipality is situated by the sea inside the islands Orust and Tjörn and traversed by the European route E6 and Bohus Line, in which it has three stops (Stora Höga, Stenungsund and Svenshögen).

The municipality was formed through amalgamation in 1952. In 1971 a parish from a dissolved municipality was added.

The coat of arms was registered in 1977. The device in the upper half is a hydrocarbon molecule, which alludes to the petrochemical industry in the municipality.

== Localities (urban areas) ==
- Aröd och Timmervik (also in Kungälv Municipality)
- Hallerna
- Jörlanda
- Starrkärr och Näs
- Stenungsund (seat)
- Stenungsön
- Stora Höga
- Strandnorum
- Svenshögen
- Ucklum
- Ödsmål

Smaller localities (villages):

- Gilltorp
- Groland
- Grössbyn
- Härgusseröd
- Kullen och Dyrtorp (biggest village)
- Kyrkenorum
- Källsby
- Nolgärde och Johannesberg
- Rödmyren och Röd
- Sandbacka
- Skotthed
- Spekeröd
- Svartehallen
- Talbo och Östra Skår
- Vulseröd

The seat is located right by the European route E6 highway and the railway Bohus Line, Bohusbanan.

In 2006, archaeological excavations in the area revealed a series of burial sites dating between 1 AD and 300 AD.

== Demographics ==
This is a demographic table based on Stenungsund Municipality's electoral districts in the 2022 Swedish general election sourced from SVT's election platform, in turn taken from SCB official statistics.

In total there were 27,522 residents, including 20,770 Swedish citizens of voting age. 41.8% voted for the left coalition and 56.8% for the right coalition. Indicators are in percentage points except population totals and income.

Location	Residents	Citizen adults	Left vote	Right vote	Employed	Swedish parents	Foreign heritage	Income SEK	Degree
Location			%	%					
Anrås-V Torp-Saxeröd	1,523	1,091	40.5	59.1	88	92	8	35,142	59
Berg-Käderöd-Hällesdalen	1,574	1,216	40.8	57.6	87	90	10	29,211	34
Brudhammar-Kopper	1,618	1,236	44.8	53.6	85	82	18	26,915	35
Doterödsvägen-Nyborg	1,710	1,409	44.9	53.0	80	80	20	24,846	40
Ekbacken-Hällebäck	1,613	1,227	47.2	51.9	90	87	13	30,915	45
Getskär-Valeberget	2,022	1,477	40.4	58.9	90	93	7	35,999	58
Gilltorp-Rämma-Högen	937	731	36.3	61.7	87	90	10	29,177	33
Hallerna-Strandkärr	1,898	1,333	40.0	59.3	87	91	9	32,773	46
Hasselbacken-Uppegårdsv.	1,885	1,250	51.0	46.4	66	51	49	19,368	21
Kvarnberget-Solgårdst.	1,435	1,116	42.6	55.6	86	84	16	29,915	47
Kyrkenorum	1,315	972	44.5	54.7	89	86	14	31,557	48
Källsby-Sävelycke	1,685	1,240	46.5	51.7	86	91	9	31,458	53
Näs-Apleröd-Stripplekärr	1,499	1,129	42.9	56.3	89	91	9	32,204	46
Spekeröd	1,319	980	36.2	62.7	88	91	9	30,126	36
Stenungestrand	1,831	1,570	41.7	57.3	76	82	18	23,857	40
Strandnorum-Kåkenäs	1,483	1,146	34.6	64.8	90	90	10	35,952	56
Svenshögen-Ucklum	2,175	1,647	36.2	60.8	84	87	13	27,796	34
Source: SVT

== Notable corporations ==
- Hogia (Official website), one of Sweden's largest native computer software developers

Since the 1950s, Stenungsund Municipality has become the center for the petrochemical industry. Its distinguished silhouette is four giant chimneys, belonging to a large power plant.

== Sports ==
The following sports clubs are located in Stenungsund Municipality:

- Stenungsunds IF
- Vallens IF
- Stss, Tjörn Runt
- Stenungsund HF
- Stenungsunds FC

== See also ==
- Stenungsund excavations
