= Bohus Line =

Railway line in Sweden

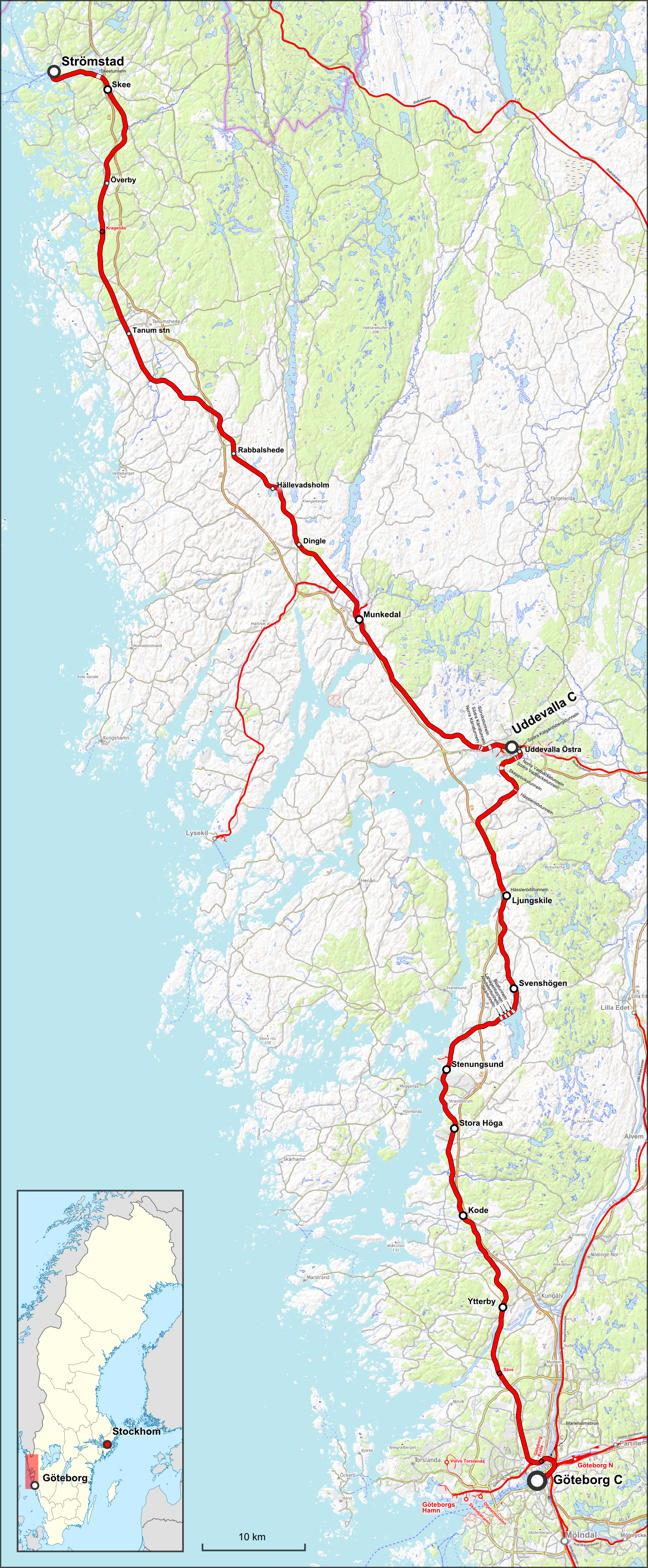
- Map of the Bohus line, that runs along the coast.

Overview
- Locale: Sweden
- Termini: Gothenburg Central Station; Strömstad

Service
- Operator(s): Västtrafik and SJ (Uddevalla-Strömstad)

Technical
- Line length: 180 km (110 mi)
- Track gauge: 1,435 mm (4 ft 8 1/2 in) standard gauge
- Operating speed: 140 km/h (87 mph)

The Bohus Line (Swedish: Bohusbanan) is a 180-kilometer-long (110 mi) railway line from Gothenburg via Uddevalla and Munkedal to Strömstad. The line is single track and electrified at 15 kV 16.7 Hz AC. Bohus Line has seventeen stations; Strömstad, Skee, Överby, Tanum, Rabbalshede, Hällevadsholm, Dingle, Munkedal, Uddevalla C, Uddevalla Östra, Ljungskile, Svenshögen, Stenungsund, Stora Höga, Kode, Ytterby and Gothenburg.

== History ==
The Bohus Line was opened in stages between 1903 and 1907 and was originally supposed to continue northwards from Skee and connect to Østfold Line in Norway but when Sweden-Norway dissolved the project was cancelled. It serves an important purpose to the communities it goes through and is very busy with many passenger services especially between Gothenburg & Stenungsund/Uddevalla and some cargo services between Gothenburg and Munkedal. The Northern half between Uddevalla and Strömstad is in pretty bad condition and only allows speeds up to 90 km/h (with the exception of Skee-Strömstad which got partially rebuilt in 2009 along with the expansion of Highway E6). Gothenburg-Uddevalla was modernized in the 1990s.

== Future ==
Double tracks between Gothenburg and Stenungsund or Uddevalla has been highly requested from both Västra Götaland County and the municipalities and communities which it passes through. Some have also wished for the Station in Ytterby to be moved to the larger community of Kungälv. New Stations in Jörlanda and Säve have been requested by those communities.

The Bohus Line connects to the Lysekil Line in Munkedal and the Älvsborg Line in Uddevalla and the Western Main Line among others in Gothenburg.

== See also ==
- Rail transport in Sweden
