= Lysekil Line =

Railway line in Sweden

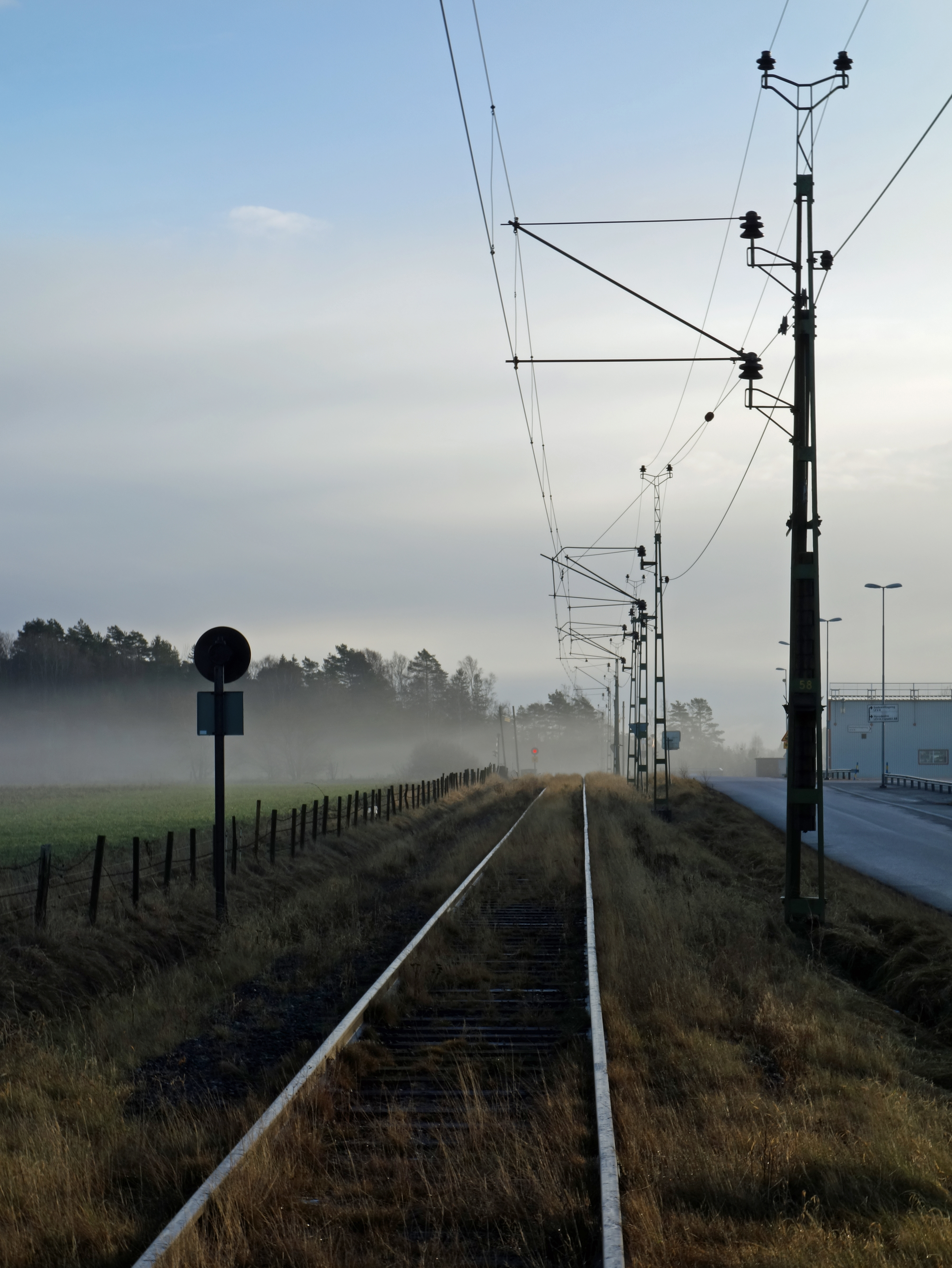
- Tracks during the off-season in Gåseberg

Overview
- Native name: Lysekilsbanan
- Status: Seasonally active
- Owner: Lysekil Railway ab, 1910–1939; Swedish government 1939–present
- Locale: Bohuslän, Sweden
- Termini: Munkedal; Lysekil
- Stations: 5

Service
- Services: 1
- Operator(s): Lysekil Railway ab, 1910–1939; Swedish State Railways, 1939–1988; Swedish Rail Administration, 1988–2010; Swedish Transport Administration, 2010–present

History
- Commenced: 1911
- Opened: 14 June 1913
- Completed: 1913

Technical
- Line length: 35 km (22 mi)
- Character: At-grade
- Track gauge: 1,435 mm (4 ft 8 1/2 in) standard gauge
- Minimum radius: 300 metres (980 ft)
- Electrification: Overhead catenary
- Operating speed: 40 km/h (25 mph)
- Highest elevation: 50 metres (160 ft)
Map showing line within Sweden
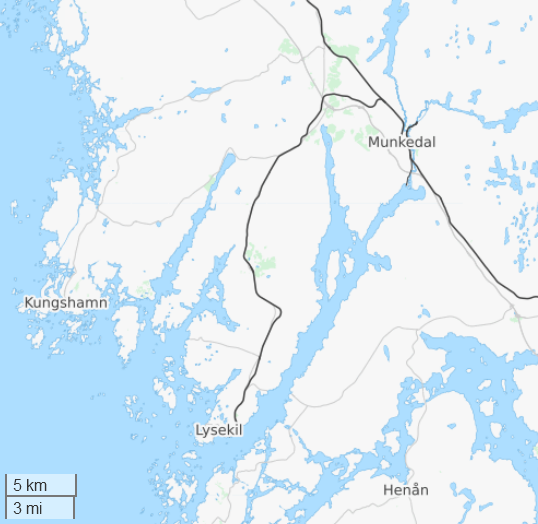

The Lysekil Line (Swedish: Lysekilsbanan) is a branch railway of the Bohus Line, connecting Smedberg and Lysekil in the Swedish province of Bohuslän. Opened in 1913, it is today a single-track, electrified standard gauge line 35 kilometres (22 mi) long. Most of it is located within the Stångenäset Hundred, closely paralleling county road 162.

Because of the hilly terrain it passes through, it has the steepest grades of any Swedish rail line, up to 2.5% in some sections. This was a result of a decision to save money on explosives during construction. Originally, it was a major freight line for the ports on the western coast along the Skagerrak; although those grades limited the amount of freight it could carry.

Regular passenger service ended in 1983, by which time the road and ferry network along the coast had made it much easier to get to Gothenburg by automobile. Thereafter the line was open only during the summer months, primarily carrying vacationers to Lysekil. That service was stopped entirely in 2015, although the track is still maintained for possible future use.

== Route ==
The line diverges from the Bohus Line at a level crossing 5 kilometres (3.1 mi) northwest of Munkedal amid a generally level rural landscape of fields, farms and woodlots. It curves to the south and then almost as soon back to the west-northwest, north of Håby. Over the next 2 kilometres (1.2 mi), it gradually runs more westward and then turns south, crossing under county road 165 and the E6 motorway, and descending, 36 metres (118 ft) from Smedberg to its lowest point outside Lysekil, a stream crossing near Gläborg at 2 metres (6 ft 7 in).

Soon it assumes a southwesterly course in close parallel with county road 162, climbing again to almost 40 metres (130 ft). Curving gently between fields and hills roughly 300 metres (980 ft) west of the road, after 3 kilometres (1.9 mi) it runs immediately adjacent to the road through a narrow gap between hills, after which it crosses underneath the highway, paralleling it on its east to the station at Hallinden, currently used as a park and ride, but with a platform providing access to trains.

South of Hallinden the road and rail both begin a straight course due southwest. The tracks are for most of this stretch immediately adjacent, never more than 100 metres (330 ft) from the 162 road, descending through hillier terrain. At Brodalen, 4 kilometres (2.5 mi) from Hallinden, the site of a former station, the two veer slightly southward, with some slight curvature.

After approximately 1.5 kilometres (0.93 mi), climbing steadily again, just north of Brastad, tracks and road turn southeast into the village, the largest community the line passes through between its termini. It again diverges slightly from the road to another station and platform here, although it too is primarily used as a bus stop. South of Brastad, the road and tracks are again parallel and adjacent, going up more dips and rises in the terrain as they turn further to the south for a kilometer, then bending southwest for another.

At Gåseberg, the Lysekil Line makes its greatest divergence from 162 since the two became closely aligned, bending to the east through a narrow gap between hills almost 400 metres (1,300 ft) east of the highway. At 50 metres (160 ft) above sea level this is the highest point on the line. Both curve to the southwest again and a kilometer to the south, at Häggvall, the road and track are again adjacent to each other. Within a kilometre, however, they separate again, with 200 metres (660 ft) between them for another kilometre as both go over some more rolling terrain, reaching almost 34 metres (112 ft) this time. By the time they both reach county road 161, they are together again.

The road and track go up another rise and begin a slightly curvy course to the south as they begin to reach the outskirts of Lysekil. They remain parallel as they descend into the town, turning south then southwest over the next 2.5 kilometres (1.6 mi). At the coastline they both turn west to follow it, with the tracks running at a lower grade than the road, along the water's edge near the various port and dock facilities. After a kilometre, extra tracks branch off at the Lysekil station for yard purposes. Following a short bend to the southwest again, the tracks end with a bumper block at the Gullmarn ferry dock.

== History ==
=== Early plans: 1886–1906 ===
A grant was made in 1886 for the first rail line to Lysekil, then a bustling port on Sweden's western coast. It was intended to connect to the Bergslagen Line at Frändefors in Dalsland, but then extended to Sikhall Vänern. The putative operators were unable to secure the SEK2.9 million in funding for the 90-kilometre-long (56 mi) line after plans for expanded port facilities at Lysekil turned out to be more complicated than expected, however, and the grant expired with no construction taking place.

In 1898, Sweden's parliament, the Riksdag, authorised the construction of the Bohus Line, from Gothenburg to Skee as part of what it hoped would be an eventual connection to Norway, making a line to Lysekil more viable. Plans for a connection from Dingle were drawn up in 1900, largely following the current route, but turned out to be too expensive. A later revised proposal connected at Smedberg, but did not sufficiently reduce costs.

=== Construction: 1907–1913 ===
Plans for the line lay dormant until 1907, when a committee formed by the Lysekil business community and government officials filed for a new license to build the line; it was granted the following year. After raising SEK1.2 million through subscriptions bought by local businesses and individuals, the Lysekils järnvägsaktiebolag (LyJ), a limited liability company, was founded in 1910. It soon doubled its finances with a loan from the government.

A captain in the country's Civil Engineering Corps identified two possible routes, one with a maximum grade of 1.6%, the other at 2.5%. The latter route was within the budget, so it was chosen. In order to save money on explosives, the line climbed up and down the hills of Bohuslän rather than go through cuts or tunnels. As a result, it has some of the steepest grades on any rail line in Sweden. This has kept speed limits on the line—50 kilometres per hour (31 mph) at its inception—low throughout its existence.

The completed line was 34.7 kilometres (21.6 mi) long, with 3.2 kilometres (2.0 mi) of sidings. Six stations were built, along with four stops. It was only necessary to build three bridges; the longest was 10 metres (33 ft). In the maintenance yard at the Lysekil end, there was a 12-metre (39 ft) turntable with two stalls for the locomotives.

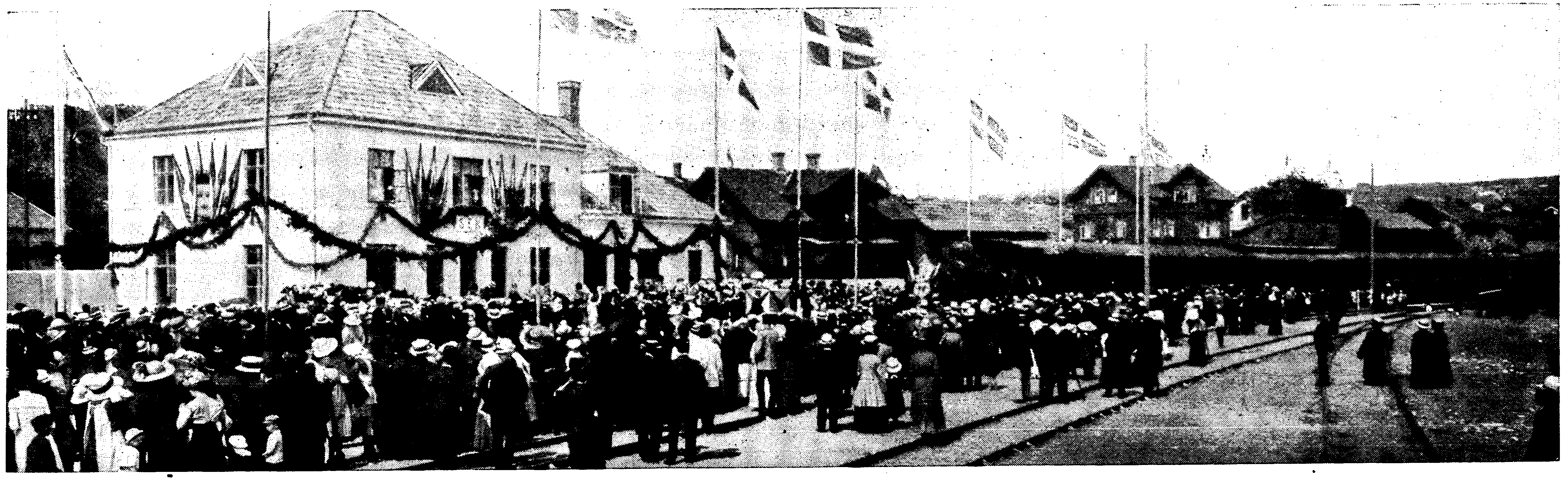
Lysekil station on the line's opening day

Electrification was possible for an additional SEK150,000, but the company could not raise the additional money. Before completing the line LyJ bought two tank locomotives from Nydqvist & Holm in nearby Trollhättan to pull cars. Construction was finished in June 1913 and the line opened shortly thereafter.

=== Early success: 1914–1932 ===
The next year the company bought another Nydqvist locomotive. Shortly after service began, the company realized the earlier locomotive was not powerful enough and bought a third. Its other rolling stock included three passenger cars, a combination mail and baggage car, along with 28 freight cars.

In its early years the line prospered. Passenger traffic, particularly summertime visitors to the seaside, was supplemented by freight, including many tonnes of Bohus granite and Lysekil caviar. However, the line's steep grades limited its hauling capacity, as the locomotives could only pull a certain number of carriages at a time.

The LyJ responded by investing some of its profits in improved facilities and extra stock. In 1917 it extended the stall in the Lysekil yard to allow for a workshop and a spur leading to it. Three years later, it bought a used 1889-built locomotive tender from Swedish State Railways (SJ), leading to a further expansion of the stalls to accommodate it the following year.

With the increased capacity, the railway kept growing. In 1925 it bought seven more cars to handle higher passenger volumes, and 11 more freight cars. Seven years later, in 1932, it bought a diesel-electric railcar that had always been part of its original plans and added a special stall for it in Lysekil.

=== State ownership and decline: 1932–1983 ===
The 1930s were not as successful for the LyJ. With the expansion of Sweden's road network and more people buying automobiles, more passenger and freight traffic was moved that way. Shareholders had never received a single dividend. In 1939 SJ offered to buy the ailing, debt-ridden line, and the company sold it. It has remained in public hands ever since.

Once in government hands, service was cut back. In the late 1940s, the rails were replaced with heavier material in preparation for the line's 1950 electrification; the signals along the line also were upgraded as well. Since there was no longer any need for the locomotive stalls at Lysekil, they were demolished.

Traffic on the line continued to dwindle over the next decades, making maintenance of way less of a priority for SJ. In the 1960s, with passenger traffic half of what it had been at the line's peak and freight revenue down 20% from that time, it considered closing the line. By 1977 the track had deteriorated to the point that speed limits had to be lowered to 30 kilometres per hour (19 mph); it was repaired within the year although the limit remains. Regular passenger service ended in September 1981; it was formally ended two years later.

=== Uncertain revival: 1984–present ===
Freight use continued intermittently for the remainder of the 20th century; Västra Götaland County took over operational responsibility for that in 1988. The next year the original railcars, which had remained in the Lysekil yard after the locomotive stalls were demolished, were finally removed.

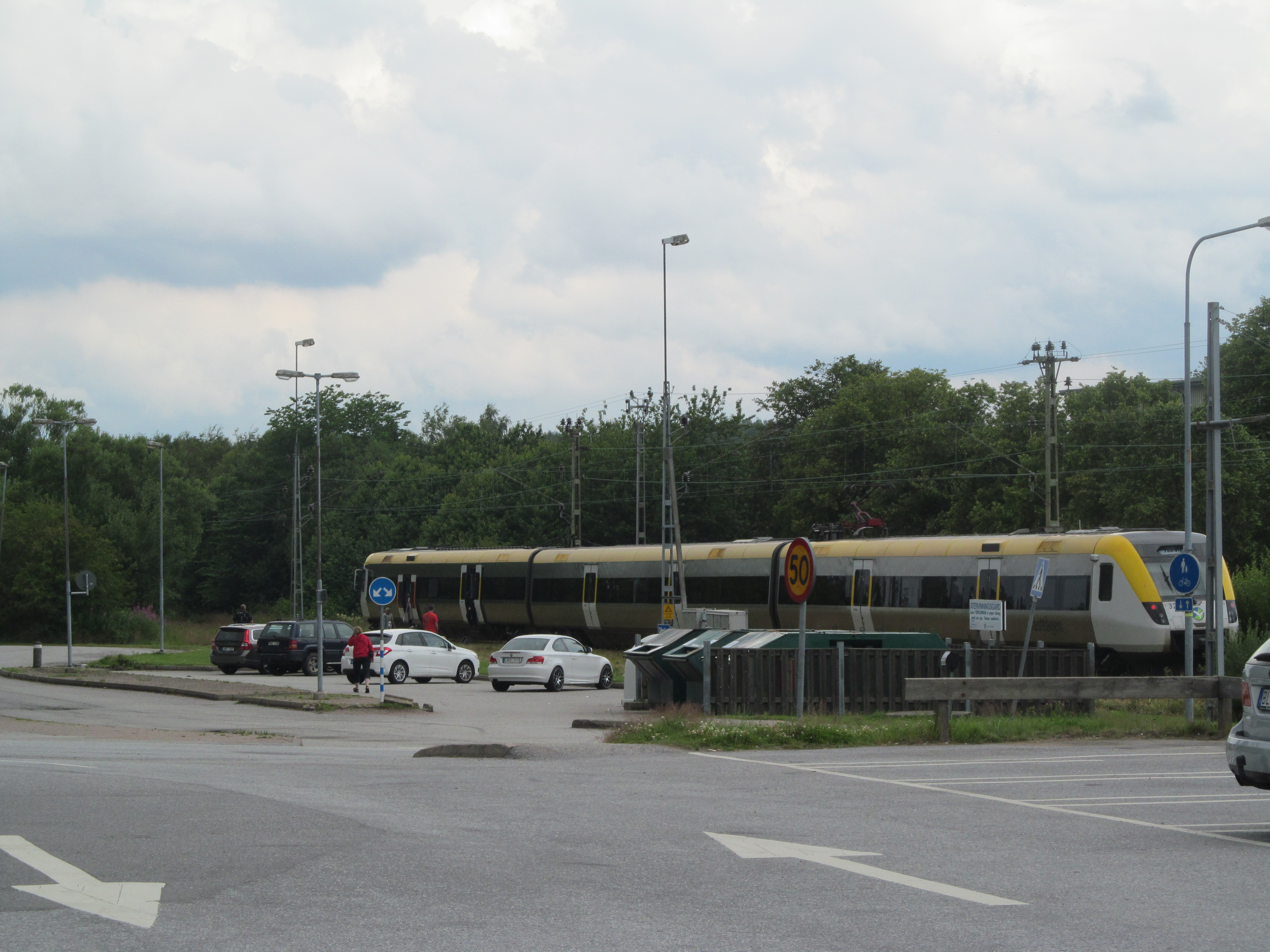
A demonstration passenger train at Brastad in 2012

Many of the original stations between Lysekil and Munkedal were acquired by other individuals and eventually demolished. In 2004 the Hallinden station burned down; an ambulance garage was built on the site. Regular freight services continued to decline, and stopped entirely after Stora Enso ceased to use the line in 2010.

In 2012, the Swedish Transport Administration (Trafikverket), which had inherited SJ's responsibilities, announced it would discontinue maintenance of the line. The next year, it raised the possibility that it might tear up the tracks entirely.

After considerable local uproar, Trafikverket announced it would continue service for at least a few years. A limited summer schedule was announced for 2014. On the first day of service, the train was seven minutes late getting to Lysekil since the driver had to get out of the train before departure and turn on the line's electric power. The trains, which could hold about 270 passengers, instead carried an average of ten each trip. Trafikverket said that was to be expected, since it had not had time to promote the service before starting it.

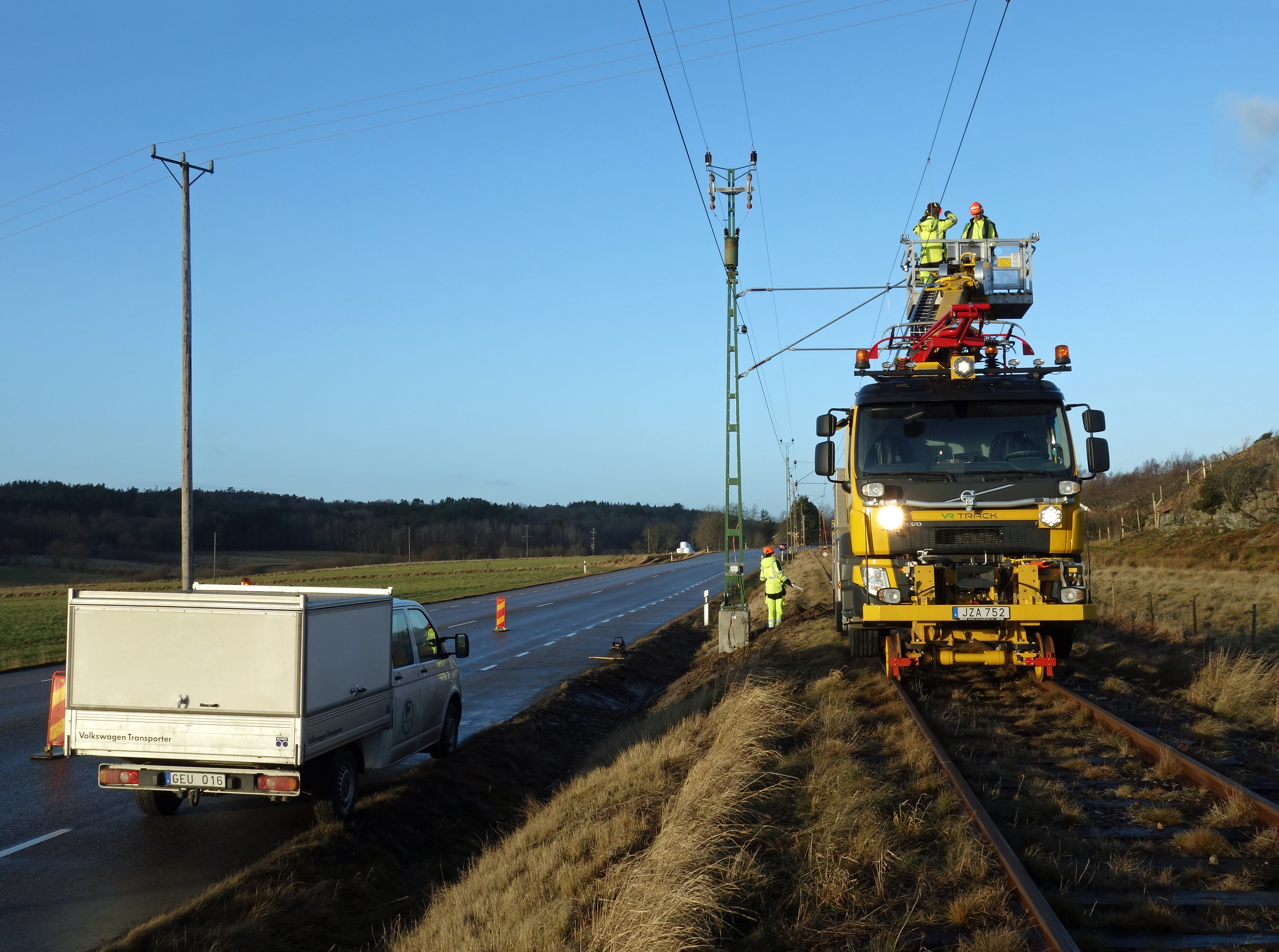
Maintenance being done on the line in December 2016

Service was continued in summer 2015, but not in 2016. In January, Bengt Rydhed, deputy regional administrator for Trafikverket, said the agency saw no reason to continue operating the line. Maintenance of the track continued that summer, however, since no plan had been made to abandon it. In August, revival plans encountered another setback when Tata Steel changed its plans to ship rails into Sweden via the port at Lysekil, instead shipping them directly from its French plant by rail.

Late in the year, Trafikverket and Lysekil Municipality began discussing the possibility of the latter taking over the line, or another party. In March 2017, Trafikverket said that despite the SEK7.5 million it had been spending the last few years to maintain the track, it was still in very poor condition and it was highly doubtful that it would run trains along it this summer. As summer approached, prospects did not look significantly better either for passenger service or for the line's long-term future.

On 30 January 2018, the Swedish Transport Administration (Trafikverket) announced that all maintenance and traffic on the line will cease 9 December 2018, as the switch in Smedberg is disconnected. In May 2021 fairly much overhead wire was stolen, and after that Trafikverket removed all remaining overhead wire to prevent further theft and damage.

== See also ==
- Munkedal Municipality
- Rail transport in Sweden
