= Stenungsund =

Stenungsund, Sweden
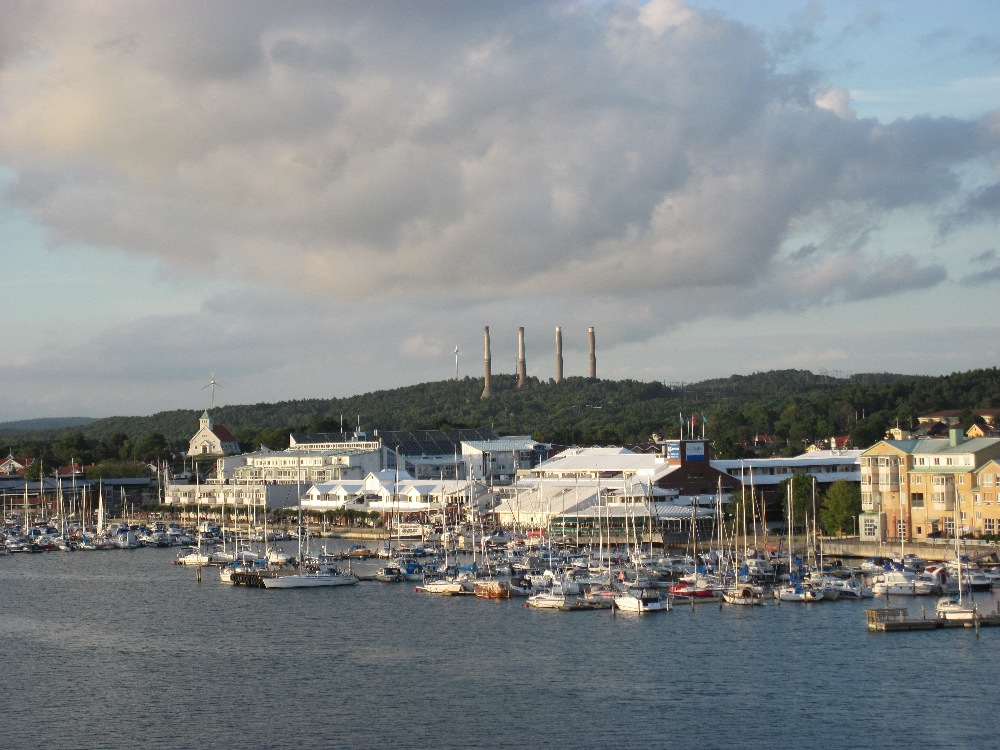
- Stenungsund guest harbour in August 2010

- Location within Västra Götaland Location within Sweden
- Coordinates: 58°05′N 11°49′E
- Country: Sweden
- Province: Bohuslän
- County: Västra Götaland County
- Municipality: Stenungsund Municipality

Area
  - Total: 11.12 km^{2} (4.29 sq mi)

Population (31 December 2010)
  - Total: 9,987
  - Density: 898/km^{2} (2,330/sq mi)
- Time zone: UTC+1 (CET)
  - Summer (DST): UTC+2 (CEST)

Stenungsund (Swedish pronunciation: [stɛnɵŋˈsɵnːd]) is a locality and the seat of Stenungsund Municipality, Västra Götaland County, Sweden with 23,429 inhabitants in 2023.

== Overview ==
Stenungsund was once only an idyllic bathing and vacation location on the Swedish west coast. A landmark is the Tjörn Bridge, a bridge to the island Tjörn. Stenungsund is also home to several industries and business, with a total of 2000 registered businesses.

The annual long-distance sailing competition Tjörn Runt starts in Stenungsund.

Archaeological excavations in Stenungsund in 2006 discovered a site of Iron Age burials (1st - 3rd century AD), notable for the unusual presence of Roman ceramic artifacts.

== History ==
The name Stenungsund comes from the village stenunge that was located where central Stenungsund now exists. Historians believe the name meant "the village at the foot of the mountain." The village had several names including Staenungum, Steffningsbyn and lastly Stännung.

On 23 September 2023 a quick clay landslide on the E6 highway took place, injuring three people and destroying the motorway, a local road, a fuel station and a fastfood restaurant. A shop selling wood and building materials lost its access to the road network. After nine months of repair work, the E6 motorway reopened on Friday the 5th of July 2024, in the early morning hours.

== Climate ==
Climate data for Rörastrand, Tjörn 10 kilometres (6.2 mi) west of Stenungsund, (2002–2021 averages, extremes since 1961 including Säby)
Month	Jan	Feb	Mar	Apr	May	Jun	Jul	Aug	Sep	Oct	Nov	Dec	Year
Record high °C (°F)	10.4 (50.7)	10.8 (51.4)	17.1 (62.8)	26.8 (80.2)	30.1 (86.2)	30.4 (86.7)	32.3 (90.1)	32.5 (90.5)	26.3 (79.3)	21.1 (70.0)	14.6 (58.3)	11.1 (52.0)	32.5 (90.5)
Mean maximum °C (°F)	7.4 (45.3)	7.7 (45.9)	12.3 (54.1)	18.6 (65.5)	23.7 (74.7)	26.5 (79.7)	28.1 (82.6)	27.2 (81.0)	23.0 (73.4)	16.7 (62.1)	11.9 (53.4)	8.5 (47.3)	29.5 (85.1)
Mean daily maximum °C (°F)	2.4 (36.3)	2.6 (36.7)	6.2 (43.2)	11.8 (53.2)	16.4 (61.5)	20.0 (68.0)	22.1 (71.8)	21.3 (70.3)	17.6 (63.7)	11.8 (53.2)	7.2 (45.0)	4.1 (39.4)	12.0 (53.5)
Daily mean °C (°F)	0.1 (32.2)	0.1 (32.2)	2.7 (36.9)	7.2 (45.0)	11.8 (53.2)	15.5 (59.9)	17.9 (64.2)	17.3 (63.1)	13.9 (57.0)	8.7 (47.7)	5.0 (41.0)	1.9 (35.4)	8.5 (47.3)
Mean daily minimum °C (°F)	−2.3 (27.9)	−2.5 (27.5)	−0.9 (30.4)	2.6 (36.7)	7.2 (45.0)	11.0 (51.8)	13.6 (56.5)	13.2 (55.8)	10.2 (50.4)	5.6 (42.1)	2.7 (36.9)	−0.4 (31.3)	5.0 (41.0)
Mean minimum °C (°F)	−11.9 (10.6)	−10.5 (13.1)	−8.2 (17.2)	−3.6 (25.5)	0.4 (32.7)	5.7 (42.3)	8.8 (47.8)	7.4 (45.3)	3.0 (37.4)	−2.2 (28.0)	−5.6 (21.9)	−9.1 (15.6)	−14.4 (6.1)
Record low °C (°F)	−26.9 (−16.4)	−31.1 (−24.0)	−21.2 (−6.2)	−8.6 (16.5)	−4.0 (24.8)	0.7 (33.3)	4.0 (39.2)	2.0 (35.6)	−3.0 (26.6)	−9.0 (15.8)	−15.7 (3.7)	−23.2 (−9.8)	−31.1 (−24.0)
Average precipitation mm (inches)	85.4 (3.36)	66.9 (2.63)	56.7 (2.23)	51.3 (2.02)	58.8 (2.31)	69.8 (2.75)	85.3 (3.36)	102.3 (4.03)	91.3 (3.59)	113.6 (4.47)	96.8 (3.81)	91.5 (3.60)	969.7 (38.16)
Average extreme snow depth cm (inches)	12 (4.7)	13 (5.1)	8 (3.1)	0 (0)	0 (0)	0 (0)	0 (0)	0 (0)	0 (0)	1 (0.4)	2 (0.8)	7 (2.8)	19 (7.5)
Average precipitation days (≥ 1 mm)	13	10	9	8	10	10	10	12	11	13	14	14	134
Source 1: SMHI Open Data for Rörastrand, precipitation
Source 2: SMHI Open Data for Rörastrand, temperature

=== Notable people ===
- Peter Abrahamsson - footballer
- Marcus Dahlin - handball player
- Linus Fernström - ice hockey player
- Ann-Britt Leyman - long jumper and sprinter
- Stefan Lindskog - lawyer
- Tobias Mikaelsson - footballer
- Marie Nilsson - trade union leader
- Holger Pettersson - radiologist
- Ivar Stenberg - ice hockey player
- Otto Stenberg - ice hockey player

== Sports ==
The following sports clubs are located in Stenungsund:

- Stenungsunds IF
- Stenungsunds FC
- Stenungsunds IBK
- Stenungsund HF
