= European route E6 =

Road in trans-European E-road network

E6

Major junctions
- North end: Kirkenes, Norway
- South end: Trelleborg, Sweden

Location
- Countries: Norway, Sweden

Highway system
- International E-road network; A Class; B Class
← E5	→ E7

European route E6 (Norwegian: Europaveg 6, Swedish: Europaväg 6, or simply E6) is the main north–south thoroughfare through Norway as well as the west coast of Sweden. It is 3,056 km (1,899 mi) long and runs from the southern tip of Sweden at Trelleborg, into Norway and through almost all of the country north to the Arctic Circle. As many travellers who love road trips use E6 to get to Nordkapp, a common misconception is that E6 leads to North Cape, but the route ends in Kirkenes close to the Russian border. To get to North Cape, one has to fork off E6 at Olderfjord and take European route E69, from the mainland through the North Cape Tunnel, onto the island of Magerøya. The Norwegian part of E6 functions as Norway's transport backbone, often being the only continuous paved road, connecting north and south. When E6 gets interrupted, Norway gets cut into two pieces (Norge er delt i to), and detours are often hundreds of kilometers long, through Sweden, or along the coast, involving ferry crossings. More examples of frequent closures of E6 can be found below, in the chapter Vulnerable infrastructure, often interrupted.

== Route ==
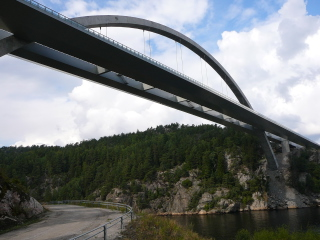
The Svinesund Bridge crosses the border between Norway and Sweden

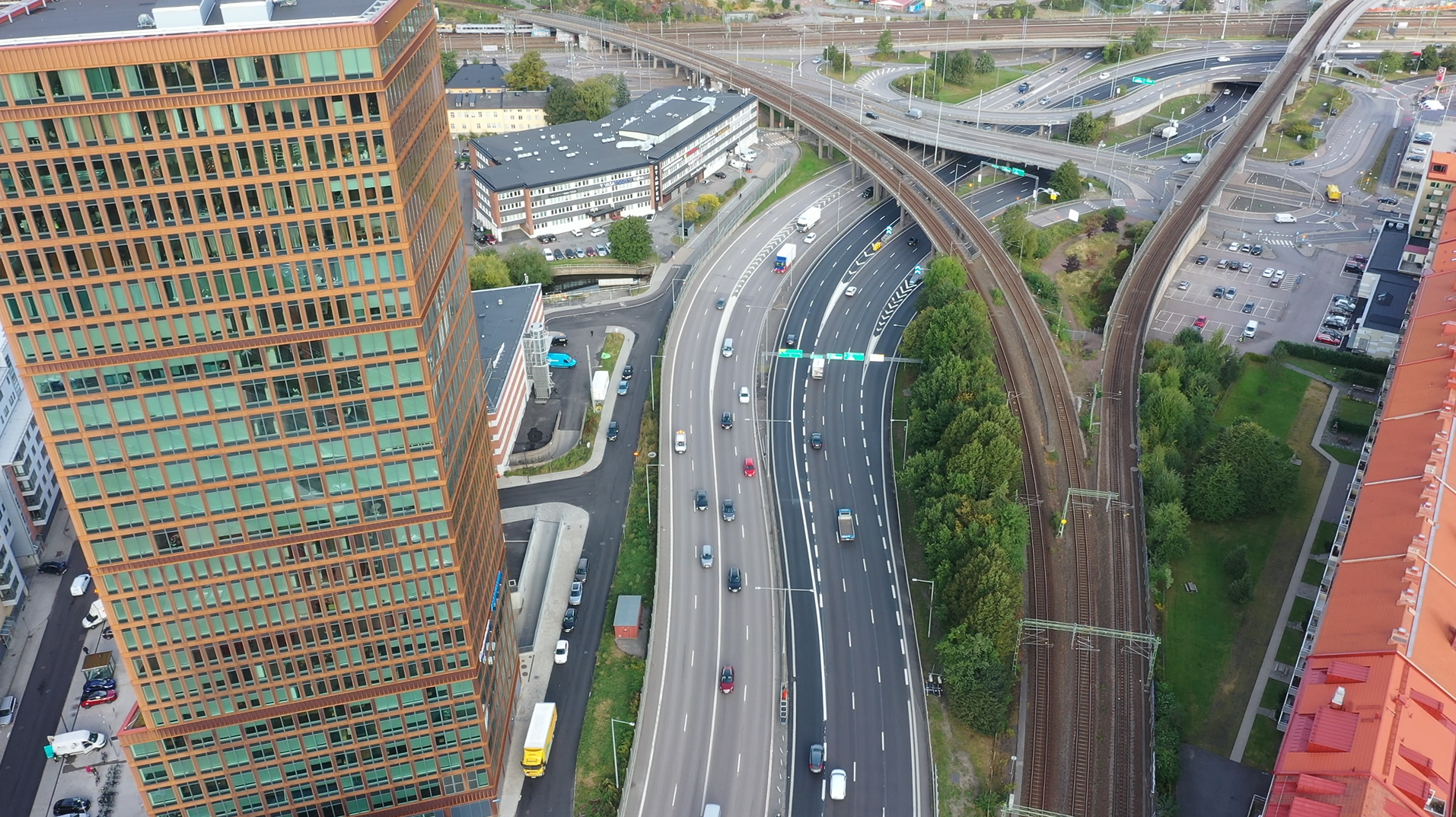
The West Coast Motorway E6/E20 in Gothenburg, coming from Malmö. At the junction Olskroksmotet, from where the E20 continues east towards Stockholm and E6 continues north towards Oslo.

From south to north, the E6 runs through Trelleborg, Malmö, Helsingborg, Halmstad, Gothenburg, Svinesund in Sweden, before crossing the border at the Svinesund Bridge into Norway. It then passes Halden, Sarpsborg, Moss, Vestby to the capital Oslo. North of this, it passes by Gardermoen, Hamar, Lillehammer, Dombås, Oppdal, Melhus to Trondheim.

Beyond Trondheim, the E6 meets Stjørdalshalsen, Verdalsøra, Steinkjer, Grong, Mosjøen, Mo i Rana, then over the Saltfjellet mountains. It then passes through Rognan, Fauske, and Hamarøy towards Bognes, where there is a ferry crossing over the Tysfjorden to Skarberget. It then runs through on via Narvik, Setermoen, Nordkjosbotn, Skibotn, and Alta to Olderfjord, where European route E69 continues north towards Nordkapp. The E6, meanwhile, turns south towards Lakselv and Karasjok, then runs on the west bank of the Anarjohka, which forms the border with Finland. Beyond the border, it passes through Varangerbotn, and Kirkenes, where the road terminates just east of the town centre.

Between Trelleborg and Kirkenes, there is a more than 800 km (500 mi) shorter route using E4 and E75, among the longest detours any European route has. In Finnmark there are several shorter alternative routes to the E6. Moreover, on the stretch from Oslo to Trondheim, following E6 strictly is a 40-kilometre (25 mi) detour compared to using Norwegian National Road 3 or Norwegian National Road 4 for their applicable portions of the trip.

== Features ==
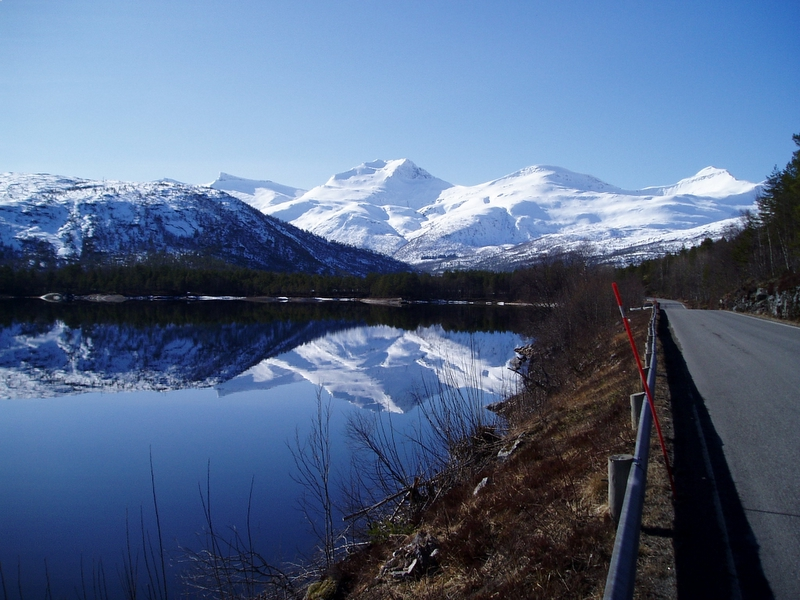
The E6 south of Narvik

The road is a 2+2 lane motorway from outside Trelleborg to Moelv, about 740 kilometres (460 mi). The last Swedish part of the E6 motorway through Bohuslän was completed in 2015. This motorway is also connected to Central Europe by uninterrupted motorway (via E20). Some stretches further north also have four lanes or motorway standards. The rest of the road is usually 6–10-metre (20–33 ft) wide ordinary road. Some parts in the north of Norway are less than 6 m (20 ft) wide, making it very tight when heavy vehicles meet. The northern half of the road, north of Trondheim, is also often fairly curvy, making high speeds a possible safety hazard.

E6 passes over treeless mountain passes in a few places in Norway. In the winter, bad weather and snow storms can cause the road to be temporarily closed, though, unlike many minor roads, it is kept open wherever practical. Because the road is the main artery through the country, cyclists and leisure travellers avoid the southern sections owing to the excessive traffic. In the north, traffic used to be sparse in 2009, but traffic numbers on E6 may have increased since the number of mobile homes in Europe has doubled, or because road trips and van life are being largely promoted on social media.

== Electronic road tolls in Norway ==
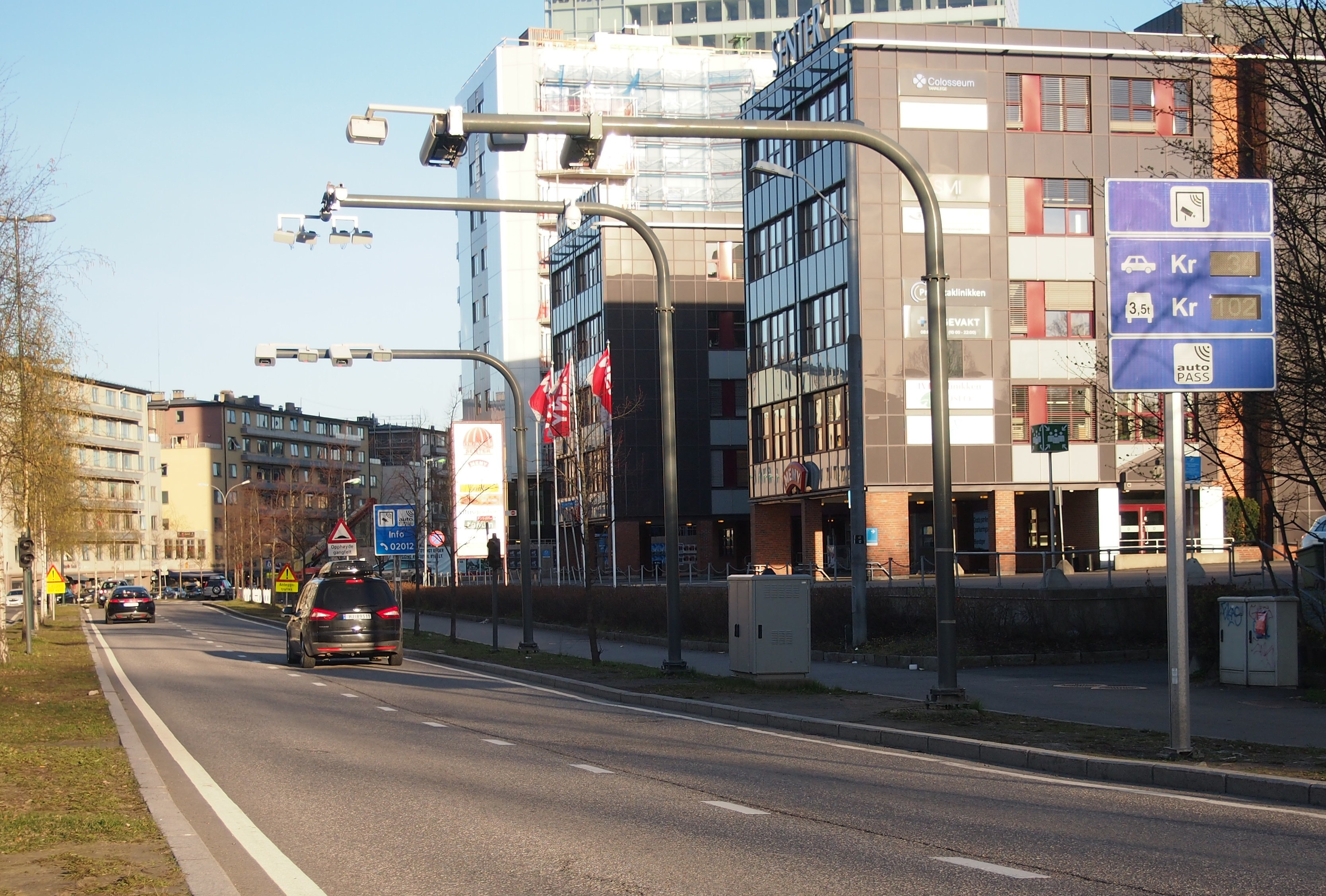
Electronic tolling station inside Oslo. Congestion charging may be applied.

Travellers driving from Svinesund, at the border between Norway and Sweden, to the other end of E6 in Kirkenes, will pass around 32 electronic toll stations on the Norwegian stretch of E6 between Svinesund and Bjerkvik. Without prior registration, the cost of a straight trip from Svinesund to Kirkenes, with a petrol or diesel car weighing less than 3500 kilos, remaining only on E6, was NOK 1072 (about €90,45) with rush hour fares included, by the end of October 2024. The last electronic toll station would be Hålogaland Bridge, between Narvik and Bjerkvik. The number of tolls to pass and pay for will however increase as soon as one drives off the E6, into cities with toll rings, either for sleeping in a hotel or for sightseeing. The number of toll stations one encounters on E6 can decrease when road projects have been paid for and toll stations are abandoned. The number of toll stations can also go up in the future if new roads need to be financed. As of October 2024, there are no electronic road tolls on E6 in Finnmark.

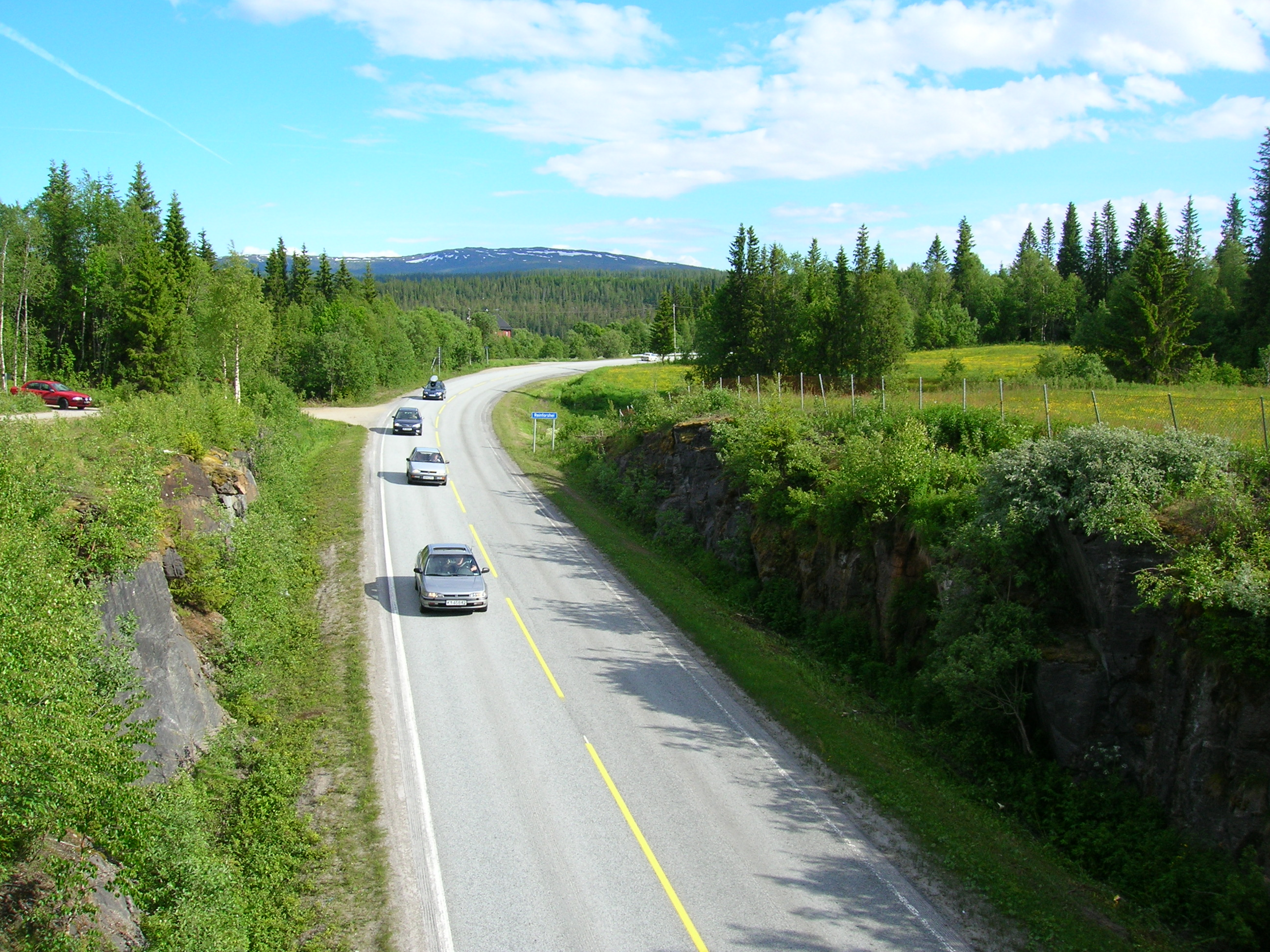
Reinforshei on Saltfjellet in 2007. In 2024 it costs 18 Kroner to drive a car without toll badge on this stretch of E6, far from any motorway

The Norwegian system of electronic tolls is based on the assumption that every road user has a credit card and a smartphone to register their vehicle at www.Autopass.no, a website owned by the Norwegian national road administration. There is no place or way to pay for your tolls with cash. If the tolls aren't paid by registering the vehicle online, a bill with a higher price will be sent to the vehicle owner's address. It is also not possible to evade toll sections by taking smaller parallel roads. Quite a lot of foreign visitors to Norway do not understand how roads that are not motorways can even be toll roads. Others are complaining that the Norwegian road toll system works like a trap, because the amount of road toll in cities like Oslo and Trondheim tends to depend on multiple factors, like time of travelling and emission category of the vehicle, making it impossible to predict the exact price of a road trip from the Swedish border at Svinesund till Nordkapp (North Cape). Most toll calculation apps, tools, or websites will not allow you to set out a road trip that keeps you driving on E6 all along the way.

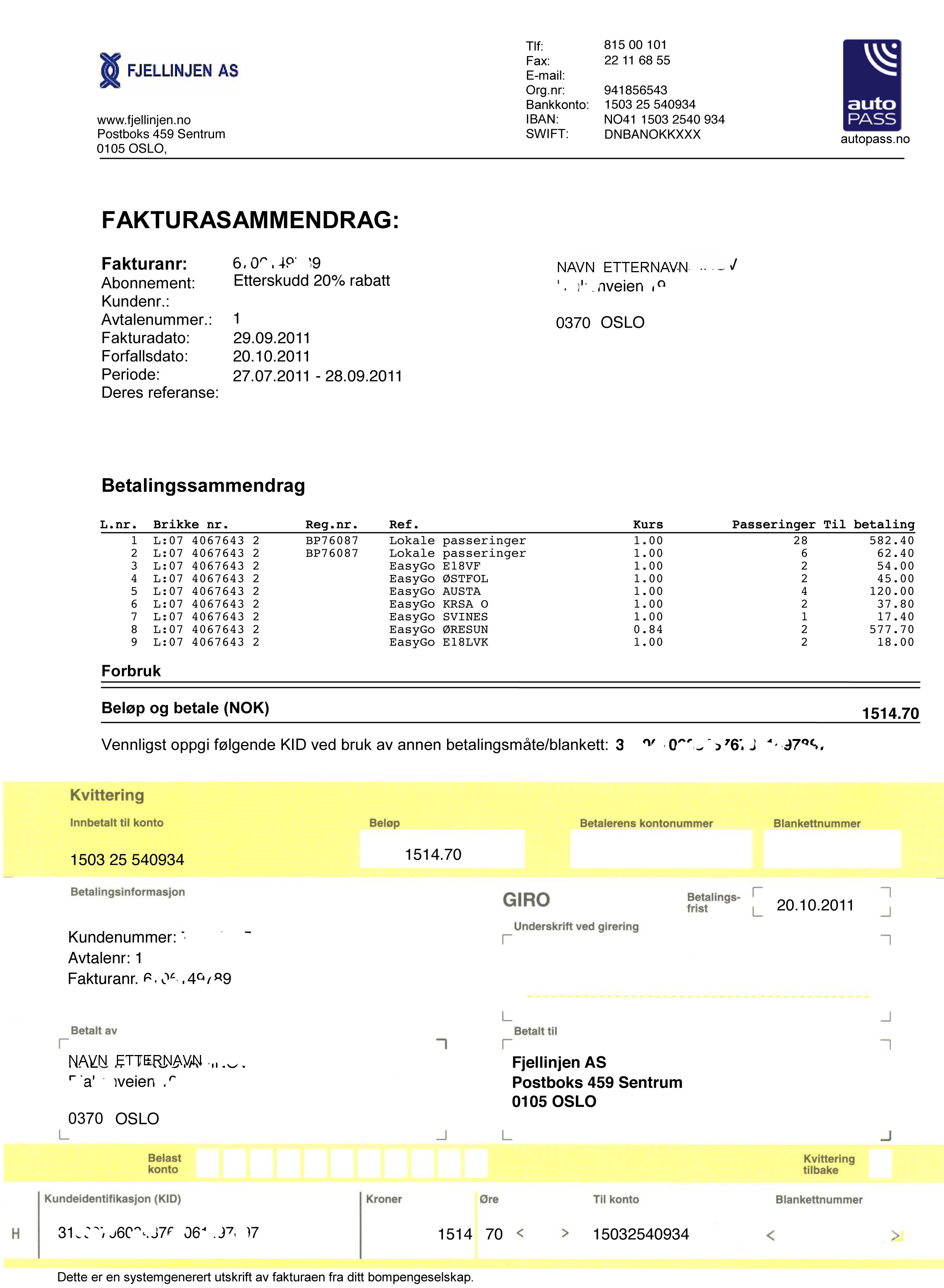
Invoice for electronic road tolling from 2011.

Electric cars have large discounts on tolls, but it can be fairly hard to obtain this discount with a foreign electric car. Scammers have been reported to jump on the bandwagon, by sending fake toll bills, to obtain credit card information. Increasing road tolls were also the reason for a large protest in several cities in Norway in 2018 and 2019. Norwegian authorities refuse to comment on the number of fines for unpaid tolls that they cannot collect. Public broadcaster NRK investigated and has written a long news article, in which they estimate that Norway has missed out on about 90 million Kroner (about 7,58 million Euros) between May 2021 and December 2023, because tourists have not paid their electronic road tolls. Norway cannot force drivers with foreign registered cars to pay, as long as Liechtenstein has not ratified EETS (European Electronic Toll Service), a European regulation on tolls. NRK spoke with angry locals who were contemplating on closing roads popular with tourists. NRK also spoke with Germans who had not registered their camper van, because they were told that they would get a letter with a payment request sent home into their mailbox. Norway was trying to strike deals on enforcing payment of road tolls with individual countries, to compensate for the missing EETS regulation.

== History and future plans ==
This road was called E6 in the old "E" road system before 1975 and previously it continued to Rome (introduced in Sweden in 1962 and Norway in 1965). However, before 1969 E6 went only to Stjørdal near Trondheim and 1969 – 1983 to Nordkjosbotn near Tromsø. The road was considered in too bad condition to be E-routes further north until it got upgraded. Parts were gravel roads. The non-E-route sections were called National Route 6 from 1965.

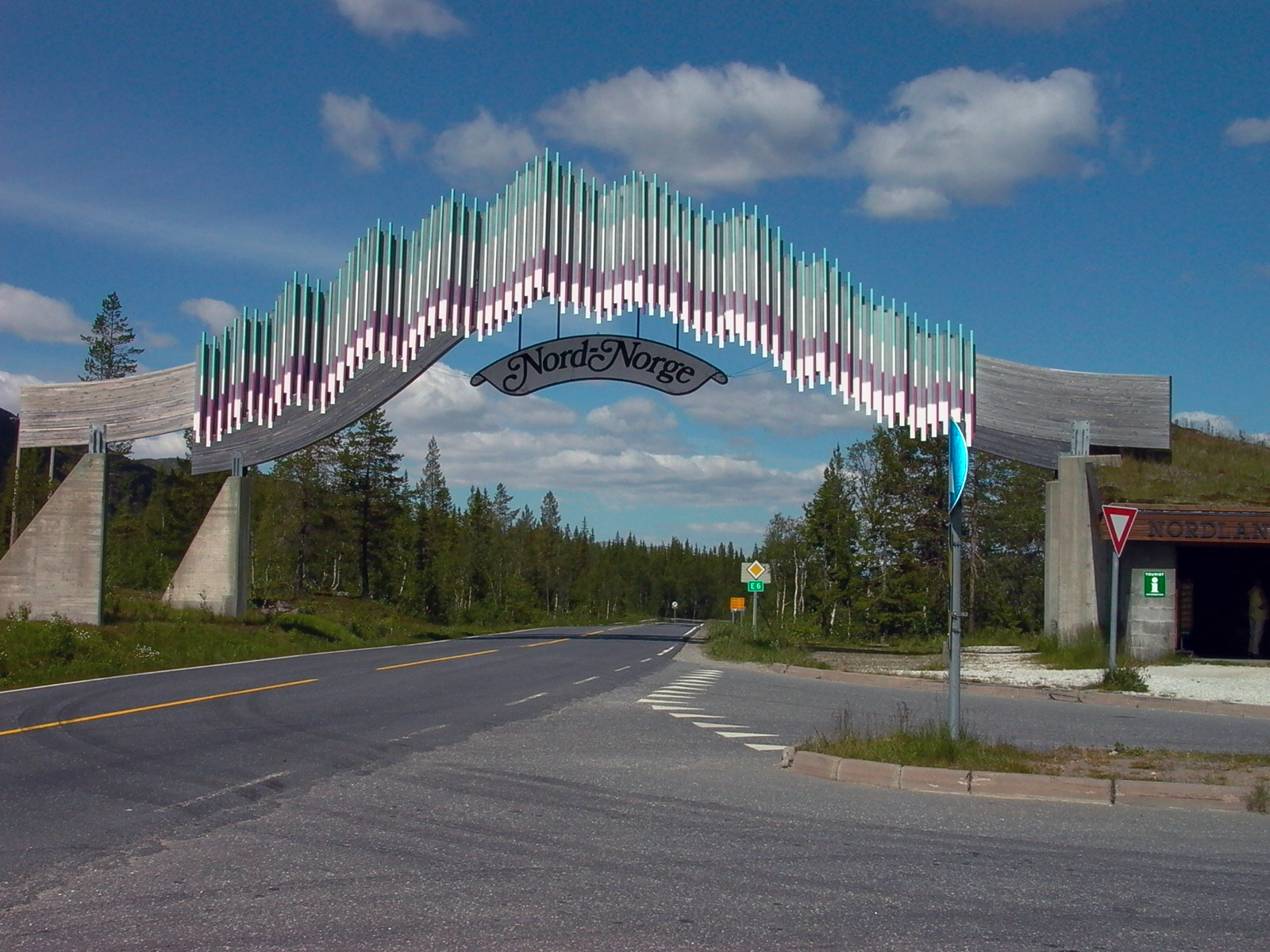
Nordlandsporten at Namsskogan, built in 1991, to welcome travellers on E6 in northern Norway.

The northern part of E6 was first opened in 1924, when the Innlandsvegen (Inland road, in English) between Grong and Mosjøen was opened to traffic. An engineer responsible for building the Innlandsvegen wrote in his daily report of 3 February 1916 that he expected little traffic on the new road. A news report published by NRK shows that the opening ceremony picture, taken on 6 August 1924, was recreated 100 years later, after the opening of two new sections of road, between Fjerdingen and Grøndalselv and between the Trøndelag district border and the lake Lille Majavatn, with a similar picture taken on 18 October 2024. The speed limit on these 2 new straightened parts of E6 has been raised from 80 to 90 kilometres per hour (56 miles per hour). E6 was numbered RV50 between Oslo and Kirkenes in 1931, to tie the north and south of Norway more closely together, even though many road sections were still missing links. In 1991 a gate was built at the county border at Namsskogan Municipality, Nordlandsporten, to welcome travellers on E6 into northern Norway. The Norwegian Public Roads Administration, Statens Vegvesen, started the Helgelands project in 2009, a project to modernise E6 and make the road wider and safer between the county border and Saltfjellet. This project is expected to be ready by the end of 2025.

The E6 road was given the number E47 (but not signposted) in the new system on most of the Scandinavian part (Helsingborg–Olderfjord), and E6 only for the northernmost 460 km (290 mi) (from Olderfjord in Finnmark). After a political negotiation, the whole part passing through Scandinavia was given the number E6 in the new system, introduced in Scandinavia in 1992. The part Trelleborg-Helsingborg was never intended to be part of E47. E47 connects to E4 at the Helsingør-Helsingborg ferry, and E4 and E6 connect just outside Helsingborg.

The E6 became a 4-lane motorway all the way from Trelleborg to Kolomoen (near Hamar) in 2015, although the road is sometimes wider. The new Svinesund Bridge opened in 2005, replacing an earlier and narrower bridge from 1946. The oldest 4-lane motorway along E6 is Gothenburg-Kungälv from 1958, meaning the motorway construction through Sweden took 57 years.

Between 2012 and 2018, the road was shortened by 39 kilometres (24 mi) between Narvik and Alta, by building the Hålogaland Bridge and more bridges and tunnels.

The 60-kilometre (37 mi) road between Moelv and Øyer is under conversion to a 4-lane motorway, partly set to be finished around 2025, partly (including a new Mjøsa Bridge) postponed to a later year, around or after 2030.

In Trøndelag, several sections north and south of Trondheim are under construction or planned as motorways. This project is planned to be 106 kilometres (66 mi) long and it will go from the junction with Norwegian National Road 3 at Ulsberg in the south to Åsen north of Trondheim Airport, Værnes, set to be finished in 2027/2028. It will be financed by Nye Veier, the Norwegian state-owned company that designs roads.

== Vulnerable infrastructure, often interrupted ==
Apart from being the most important road between Oslo and Göteborg, E6 functions as Norway's transport backbone. However, this road is rather vulnerable to snow storms, rockfalls, landslides, flooding, bridge failures and even train wrecks on the parallel railroad. Whenever E6 is closed (stengt in Norwegian) due to any such aforementioned incident, Norwegian journalists often write that Norway is cut into two pieces (Norge er delt i to), as E6 is the only continuous road in many isolated areas in Norway. Detours around incidents in the north of Norway are often hundreds of kilometres longer than driving on E6 would be.

=== Interruption due to snowstorms ===
Some mountain passes along E6 in Norway are frequently closed due to snowstorms in winter. These passes are:

- E6 over Saltfjellet in Nordland was closed 76 times in the winter of 2019–2020, while the average is 32 times per winter. There are no good alternative routes around this mountain road. One possibility is the coastal road with two ferries; another possibility is through Sweden (250 km longer), but both the ferry and the Swedish road might be closed in storms.
- Sennalandet in Finnmark was closed 48 times in the 2019–2020 season; the record is in the 2016–2017 season, when Sennalandet had 55 closures.
- Kvænangsfjellet in Troms was closed 77 times in the winter of 2019–2020. It has been closed on average 32 times per winter due to storms. A tunnel was built under the worst part of the pass in 2024, so now this route is much more reliable.
- Dovrefjell in south Norway has the highest point along E6, 1026 metres, but it is not often closed.

=== Quick clay landslide at Finneidfjord ===
On the night from 19 to 20 June 1996, around 00:30, a large quick clay landslide took place in Finneidfjord. Two residential houses and 300 metres of E6 road disappeared into the sea. NRK came back to Finneidfjord 20 years later, interviewed people who were involved in the landslide and wrote an article to commemorate the disaster. One man, who lost his house in 1996, called the landslide an open wound, still soaring in 2016, as nobody was held responsible for the landslide. It remains unknown if blasting explosions for the building of a new tunnel in E6 played a role in this landslide. Quick clay can be found in many places in Norway. Quick clay is normally solid but can become fluid and form landslides when under pressure or otherwise disturbed. After E6 was gone, traffic had to be diverted through Sweden, using European route E12.

=== Småröd landslide ===
On 20 December 2006, a large landslide occurred in Småröd, just south of Munkedal, in Bohuslän, in Sweden, in connection with the construction of a motorway at the site which also affected the old road. About 15 cars and a truck were involved, but no one was seriously injured. There were no good alternative routes past the site, so only narrow roads, different per direction, with long detours, were signposted as alternatives. A small road via Skredsvik, not mentioned in recommendations, was used by most local residents and also bus traffic. The Bohusbanan railway was also destroyed in the landslide. The road was reopened on 15 February 2007 and rebuilding of the railway line was finished on 24 February 2007. The Swedish Accident Investigation Authority wrote in its final report that this landslide was caused by a combination of underestimating the risks of unknown quick clay layers underground and piling up too much earth and sand, without evaluating the bearing force of the underlying earth layers.

=== Stavå bridge instability ===
The Stavå bridge (no:Stavåbrua) was built in 1942 and is located in Rennebu municipality, 3 km south of Berkåk, in Trøndelag fylke (district). After Norway decided to raise the maximum weight for trucks from 50 to 60 tons and Statens Vegvesen had posted a sign ordering a minimum distance of 50 meters between trucks, retired civil engineer Olav Bersås Børslett wrote a letter to local newspaper Adresse-Avisen, warning Statens Vegvesen that Stavåbrua (Stavå bridge) might get to endure heavier loads than it would be able to carry.

After military Exercise Trident Juncture 2018 Vegvesen found out that Stavå bridge had some damage that was repaired and closer monitoring was started. In March 2021 Stavå bridge was found to have more cracks. Only one direction of driving at a time was then allowed until March 2022 when a new temporary steel bridge was opened. A new four lane road will be opened here later, around 2030. The plans for the future are to repair Stavå bridge after the four lane bridge will be open, so that Stavå bridge can be used for the local road. The bridge is located at a place where the only alternatives are the very narrow road 6508, unsuitable for heavy vehicles or a 170 km detour using the ferry over Halsafjorden with limited capacity.

=== Badderen bridge washed away ===
On 31 May 2022, a fairly short river bridge near Badderen was on the brink of collapse due to an unstable support column that was about to be washed away, as a result of erosion. Traffic on E6 between Tromsø and Alta had to make a 163-kilometre (101 mi) longer journey to reach their destination. Inhabitants of Badderen were confronted with a 688-kilometre (428 mi) detour, through Finland and Sweden, if they wished to drive their car from one river bank to the other side of the river. After traffic had been interrupted for more than a week, a temporary bridge was installed over the damaged bridge and E6 was reopened for traffic on 8 June 2022.

A final report about the causes of the collapse of Badderen bridge was published in December 2022. Stetens Vegvesen admitted that they could have done better in inspecting bridges with support columns in the middle of the river for erosion. On 30 January 2023, Statens Vegvesen announced that they would set up another temporary bridge a little upstream, where the old E6 once used to be, so the damaged bridge could be dismantled, before melting snow would cause new high water levels in the river. A design for the new Badderen bridge was published for public hearings in September 2024. It is expected that a new permanent bridge over Badderelva (elva means river) will not open before 2026.

=== Quick clay landslide at Stenungsund junction ===
On 23 September 2023, a large landslide destroyed a section of about 700 metres (2,300 ft) of the highway, near Stenungsund, north of Gothenburg. The landslide also destroyed a local road, a fuel station, a fast food restaurant and a hardware store. Parked trucks got trapped in crevasses around the fuel station. The pre-1990 E6 through Ucklum was used while the motorway was closed. Shortly before King Carl XVI Gustaf arrived to cut the ribbon, on 3 July 2024, and declare the route reopened, a truckload of rotting salmon was cleared away from the site of the landslide. E6 motorway was finally reopened to traffic on 5 July 2024, several months ahead of the previous schedule, that was aiming for December 2024.

=== Train wreck on E6 near Finneidfjord ===
On 24 October 2024, around 14:15, a train on the Nordlandsbanen railway line crashed into a rock that had fallen on the tracks. According to VG newspaper, there were 46 passengers and 3 staff members on board of the train, so 49 persons in total, although some foreign media reported 55 people in the train. The train derailed, sliding down an embankment, towards the road below, which is the E6. Train driver Rolf Henry Ankersen was killed in this accident. Four passengers had to go to hospital. The rest of the passengers escaped with minor bruises and were evacuated by bus. The locomotive's front end, some trees and smaller rocks ended up on the northbound lane of the E6, between Bjerka and Finneidfjord. Police had to close both Nordland Line and E6, because there were some fears that the locomotive and one or more train cars could slide further down the embankment, or more rocks would fall.

Again the road was closed and Norway was cut in two. One detour, using FV17, involved a ferry ship crossing between Levang and Nesna, where waiting times were very long, as the ferry ship did not have enough capacity to absorb the volume of traffic that usually drives on E6. The other option for a detour went along FV73 in Norway and through Sweden, following LV-AC1116 and European route E12. The detour through Sweden, for driving from Bjerka to Finneidfjord, was about 325 km long and took around 4½ hours, compared to a 5 km drive that would take just 4 minutes under normal circumstances. A local couple started to use their fishing boat to transport people from the village over the fjord, past the train wreck. Eventually the municipality took over this ferry service. Postal service Posten announced on Wednesday 30 October 2024 that letters and packages were delayed, due to many closed railways and roads. NRK published an article about at least 5 disturbances due to the closure of E6:

- 1) Widerøe's airplanes got delayed, because the airport in Mo i Rana could no longer supply enough fuel for non-stop flights, so extra stop over landings were needed;
- 2) Coop's grocery shops were struggling to get food stocks delivered in time;
- 3) A meat factory in Bjerka had to lay off staff, or find alternative rooms for their seasonal workers who would normally be sleeping in Finneidfjord;
- 4) Letters and parcels sent by mail were one or 2 days late; and
- 5) Truck drivers got into trouble, because the long detours they had to make were not matching with the legal requirement to respect their maximum driving time and take enough breaks and nightly rest. This contributed much to the delivery problems.

On top of the closing of E6, both detours have also been closed at times, due to bad weather and traffic accidents. Storm Jakob, which triggered red alerts south of Trondheim, has aggravated the landslide risk and delayed the removal of the crashed locomotive at Finneidfjord. An orange alert was issued locally, with a warning not to travel if not necessary. During this episode of bad weather both detours failed on 29 October 2024, when the ferry service between Nesna and Levang was interrupted for several hours and the detour through Sweden was temporarily blocked by a truck that needed to be salvaged. E12 got covered in deep snow and long traffic jams started to form at the Swedish-Norwegian border. When the ferry between Nesna and Levang resumed its service, they were sailing with only one ship, since the second ferry ship had technical issues. The E12 detour road was closed again on Thursday 31 October 2024, after a car with three Norwegians crashed into the back of a stopped truck, on Blå Vägen (E12), between Bredviken and Kåtaviken, in Sweden. One of them died in hospital a few days later, as a result of his injuries.

At first, Statens Vegvesen had been rather optimistic in their announcement about reopening E6, but work at the train crash site took much longer than expected. All that BaneNOR had managed to do by Wednesday, 30 October 2024, was clearing the fallen rock from the train track and towing three train cars, that had not gone down the embankment, back to Bjerka railway station. Statens Vegvesen issued a new press release almost every day, keeping previous statements online. With each announcement, reopening of E6 was further delayed, due to a moving mountain slope, dangerously high winds, rockfall and other safety issues. BaneNOR chose to continuously update their existing press statement from Monday 28 October 2024 onwards, making previous versions disappear. The last update of Bane NOR's chain of press statements was published on 25 November 2024.

E6 was first reopened from Friday 1 November 2024 till Sunday morning 3 November 2024. By 17:49 on Sunday 3 November 2024 BaneNOR announced that weather conditions unexpectedly had allowed them to lift one of the two train cars from the embankment above the E6, which took about 30 minutes, but as the wind was picking up, it was deemed unsafe to continue the salvage operation. Statens Vegvesen decided to temporarily reopen E6 again, starting from Sunday at 21:00, because traffic conditions on the detour road through Sweden had become so bad, that taking the detour through Sweden was no longer recommended. The second train car was lifted away on Monday morning and the locomotive was salvaged on Tuesday.

Statens Vegvesen had planned for E6 to remain closed until Thursday 7 November 2024, but with the train wreck gone, E6 was reopened for traffic under guidance on Wednesday morning, 6 November 2024. Bane NOR however announced in their update of their press statement published on 11 November 2024 that they expected to continue works to secure loose rocks above the railway line until the end of November 2024, would continue till the end of November, before trains could run again on the Nordland Line; This led to temporary traffic stops on E6 of up till half an hour, whenever repair works on the railway were causing risk of rockfall. Train traffic was restored on 30 November 2024 and the traffic restrictions on E6 were lifted, 51 days after the train crash near Finneidfjord.

=== Rock fall near Morskogen ===
On 8 February 2025, large rocks fell on E6 road near Morskogen, about 20km (12½ miles) north of Eidsvoll, on the east bank of Mjøsa lake, at the northern end of Eidsvoll municipality. The rocks fell on a section of motorway, opened for traffic in 2014, where E6 was protected with iron nets. As this incident took place in southern Norway, detours were far less long than up north. Traffic was divided along RV4 from Oslo to Gjøvik, or along the much more narrow FV33, both on the west bank of Mjøsa lake. Removing the rocks and securing the rocky slope took longer than expected. On 14 February 2025 traffic was restored with reduced capacity, on one single lane per direction, sharing one carriageway with oncoming traffic. A full reopening of E6 motorway however did not take place before 10 March 2025, one month after the initial rockfall.

=== Viskisbrua getting old and rusty ===
Starting from 2 July 2025, a bridge called Viskisbrua, on E6 between Sørelva and Borkamo, in Saltdal municipality, has become a single lane bridge, with alternating traffic, traffic lights and a speed limit of 50 km/h (30 mph), after Statens Vegvesen found out that this bridge, built in 1948, is badly damaged. Pictures show that arming iron underneath the bridge is laying bare and is corroding away, with parts of the concrete missing on the sides. Should further damage to the bridge occur and lead to a closure, then the detour from one river bank to the other side of Lønselv (elva = river) would run through Sweden, totalling 610 km, instead of merely the 30 meters that the bridge is spanning. The other detour option would be RV17 on the Atlantic coast, but the ferry services on 2 crossings on RV17 would likely not be able to cope with the amount of traffic on E6.

On the 8 January 2026, Statens Vegvesen announced in a press statement that they are starting to build a section of road parallel to E6, hoping that they can set up a temporary bridge parallel to Viskisbrua by April 2026. As of January 2026 Viskisbrua was still considered to be safe for single lane use, as long as traffic is only using the middle of the bridge. The parallel bridge will be single lane as well, so that each direction of traffic will be using its own bridge. Statens Vegvesen pointed out that repairing the old bridge from 1948 would have made it necessary to close E6, which would have led to long detours through Sweden. As Statens Vegvesen is planning to modernize E6 between Sørelva and Borkamo, they expect that the temporary bridge will remain in place for a long time. On average, about 1300 vehicles per day are passing Viskisbrua.

=== 2025 Nesvatnet landslide ===
E6 was once again closed on Saturday morning, 30 August 2025, because of a landslide at Nesvatnet lake in Levanger Municipality, in Trøndelag county, in Norway. This landslide, likely caused by quick clay, has left a big gap in the new E6 road, the old E6 road and the railway track Nordlandsbanen, between Åsen and Levanger, 63 km (39 miles) northeast of Trondheim. One Danish railroad worker who was working at the site was reported missing and presumed dead by Saturday evening, even though searching was still ongoing. Twelve days after the landslide, the body of the missing Danish railroad worker was found under the collapsed railway track. Another person caught in the landslide was taken out of the water alive and is now in Levanger hospital. Ellen Maria Brende, rescue operation team leader for the Trøndelag police district, linked the landslide to excavation work that was going on at the location of the landslide, but it might have been to early to jump to conclusions, before a thorough investigation by geologists had even started. Geologist Inger Lise Solberg told NRK that no traces of earlier landslides are known in this area, but test drillings had shown the presence of quick clay before. Wider surroundings have been locked off, and 3 houses have been evacuated, because the lake shore was considered unstable and further landslides could occur.

Again, the interruption of E6 has caused lots of problems for transport in Norway and it has done some damage to the economy. After the west bank of Nesvatn lake had collapsed, the only continuous road connecting Trondheim with Narvik was a local road on the east bank of the lake, called Gamle Kongevegen Sør (Southern Old King's road), but that is a narrow country lane, totally unsuitable for taking over the usual traffic on E6. A renumbering operation of local roads has been ongoing in Norway. The local detour through Gamle Kongevegen is marked as FV111 on Google Maps, but OpenStreetMap and Statens Vegvesen show that road on the east bank of Nesvatn lake as road 6854. Should any heavy goods vehicles (HGV, trucks) try their luck on Gamle Kongevegen, they will come across a very narrow underpass under the railway line, with a sharp 90 degree turn right next to it and virtually no visibility around the bend. Large parts of Gamle Kongevegen are too small for 2 oncoming trucks to pass each other, without one of them getting stuck in the muddy ditch next to the road. Measuring Gamle Kongevegen on satellite images shows that the road is only 4½m wide, so 2 oncoming cars could pass with caution, slowly, but 2 trucks would need 5½ meters of firmly compressed gravel or tarmac to pass each other, even at pedestrian speed.

Statens Vegvesen recommended to take the Flakk–Rørvik Ferry and FV 755 (trucks not heavier than 50 tonnes), or make the detour through Sweden, from Stjørdalshalsen via E14, Swedish road 322 and Norwegian road FV72 to Verdal Municipality. This detour was 261 km long from Sandan, 7630 Åsen on the southern end of the gap in E6 to 7623 Ronglan on the northern end of the gap in E6, but it was only 6 or 7 km when taking Gamle Kongevegen, or compared to taking E6 before it collapsed into the lake. The detour through Sweden was 157 longer for traffic between Stjørdal and Steinkjer, as compared to the direct itinerary. Between 22 and 27 September 2025, around 20 railway vehicles including a few locomotives were transported as oversize road transports from Verdal in Norway over the mountain to Duved in Sweden, since no road inside Norway was allowed for oversize trucks past the landslide location.

Development in this case was expected to be ongoing, possibly even till summer 2026, but no fixed prognosis for reopening the road could be given, as it usually takes a while before the land surrounding the landslide will be declared safe enough to work on. From that moment on, it remains to be seen how E6 and the railway line can be rebuilt. Harald Inge Johnsen, from Statens Vegvesen (the Norwegian Road Authority), told NRK on Tuesday 9 September 2025, that test drilling in bedrock to build a temporary E6 around the landslide would start on Wednsesday 10 September 2025; As of 9 September, Johnsen was hoping that building a temporary E6 road section a but further north from Nesvatnet would be finished by October 2025. A local construction company claimed they could build a temporary road around the landslide within a week, if bureaucracy would not get in the way, but Johnsen had warned earlier on to go slow, because the whole area was still prone to landslides.

In an update issued on 20 October 2025, Statens Vegvesen explained that building a temporary road around the landslide turned out to be more difficult than expected. I has taken a lot of time, test drilling and research to find an itinerary that meets all the safety requirements. Building of the temporary road has started on 9 October 2025 and the road around the landslide at Nesvatnet is expected to be opened by November 2025. As long as E6 was interrupted, the same type of problems occurred as seen at Finneidfjord in 2024, like truck drivers getting into trouble with customs and maximum driving hours when driving through Sweden, or a ferry service that cannot cope with the amount of traffic taking a detour.

On Wednesday 5 November 2025, it was announced that a temporary section of E6, going around the landslide, is expected to open on 8 November 2025. From Saturday 8 November 2025, one could again use E6 through Levanger Municipality, Trøndelag, Norway. After building a temporary solution that solves the problem for truck traffic, rebuilding the original E6 on the shore of Nesvatnet lake will take lots of time. It remains unknown when the damage of the landslide at Nesvatnet lake can be fully repaired. One can only speculate that E6 will not be fully repaired before summer 2026.

=== Røra landslide and flooding ===
On 18 October 2025, with the road at Nesvatn in Levanger municipality still closed, E6 was interrupted a second time, by a landslide just north of Røra, in Inderøy municipality, 38 km northeast of Nesvatnet. A few houses were evacuated, after their neighbour wanted to drive to work and found out that their access road forking off E6 was under water, which turned out to be a consequence of what appears to be a small (quick) clay landslide, about 100 or 150 metres long, about 100 metres west of the Nordland railway line, running parallel to E6. A spokesperson and team leader for the police explained that the hillside a little uphill had collapsed and that debri soil blocked off a small water stream, turning it into a lake. The private access road forking off E6 was no longer drivable, due to the accumulated water. As the water level kept rising till Saturday evening and a geologist was running a safety inspection, the area was expected to be cordoned off until Sunday 19 October 2025. The police team leader went on to explain to NRK's reporter that the area is known for (quick) clay and really close to the railway, so the risk had to be mapped before reopening the road. A detour recommended for truck traffic, via FV755, Straumen and FV761, did not appear on Google Maps, showing the closed part of E6 as if it was open. By Sunday afternoon, 19 October 2025, Inderøy municipality announced that E6 was reopened, but the railway line remained closed, as geological research was still ongoing. As of the 25 October 2025 no further information about reopening the railway line at Røra could be found, but the railway is likely closed anyway, because of the larger landslide at Nesvatnet. Inderøy Kummune has plans to develop an area northwest of Røra into an industrial area.

=== Setså wall collapse ===
From 30 June to 9 July 2026, E6 was closed at Setså (between Rognan and Fauske) for more than a week because a stone wall E6 was built on has started collapsing. A temporary bridge is built on the location. Alternative route was road 812, a detour of around 90 km (55 mi) or 1 hour 20 minutes.

=== Alternative routes at interruptions along E6 ===
For drivers who drive along the E6, an interruption of E6 will cause the need to select another road. At some places interruptions will cause long detours. Examples include:

- Between Trelleborg and Dombås there are alternative roads, often the old road used before the present fast road was built, but the high amount of traffic on E6 might not fit along the alternative road.
- Between Dombås and Trondheim there are also alternative roads, however sometimes needing fairly long detours for drives which normally would be short along E6, in particular the Dovrefjell mountain pass.
- Between Trondheim and Steinkjer, an interruption just north of Stjørdal has no local alternative road. A ferry from Trondheim across the fjord, or 150 km longer through Sweden are the only options. A new road is being built here, to be opened 2027, keeping the old road as alternative. Other parts of this stretch have alternative roads, but often narrow and unsuitable for heavy vehicles, a scenario that happened at Nesvatnet in 2025.
- Between Steinkjer and Mosjøen, an interruption just north of Namsskogan has only a road near Brønnøysund which includes a ferry as alternative, or a 300 km detour through Sweden.
- Between Mosjøen and Mo i Rana, an interruption south of Mo i Rana has only the road past Nesna with a ferry as alternative, or an 80 km long detour (measured from Trofors south of Mosjøen) through Sweden. This interruption scenario happened at Finneidfjord in October 2024.
- Between Mo i Rana and Fauske, the road over the Saltfjellet mountain pass or near it has no local alternative road. This mountain pass is frequently closed in winter. Alternatives include the 169 km longer road 17 through Glomfjord, which however has two ferries, of them one with very low capacity, only up to ten trips per day and 50 minutes travel time. The other alternative is through Sweden, 390 km longer.
- Between Fauske and Narvik, there is between Fauske and Drag no alternative road at all, except through Sweden, 560 km longer. There are plans to build a new road here and have the old narrow road as alternative. Between Drag and Narvik there are alternative routes with a ferry, although E6 has a ferry anyway here. On 27 March 2026 a heavy vehicle caught fire in a tunnel between Fauske and Drag, which closed the tunnel for two days causing an at least 560 km longer detour through Sweden.
- Between Narvik and Olderdalen, there are alternative roads usable at interruptions.
- Between Olderdalen and Alta, the only alternative road is the E8-E45 road through Finland, which is 170 km longer. The Badderen bridge failure in May 2022 activated this scenario. The mountain pass Kvænangsfjellet was frequently closed, but a tunnel was opened 2024, creating along 15 km a much more reliable road with the old road as alternative.
- Between Alta and Narvik there are alternative roads, although giving fairly long detours for some drives including the Sennalandet mountain pass.
