= Tobias Mikaelsson =

Swedish footballer (born 1988)

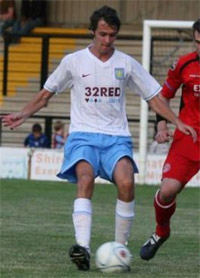
- Mikaelsson during his time with Aston Villa

Personal information
- Full name: Tobias Lars Mikaelsson
- Date of birth: 17 November 1988 (age 37)
- Place of birth: Jörlanda, Sweden
- Height: 6 ft 3 in (1.91 m)
- Position: Forward

Youth career
- Vallens IF
- 2003–2005: Ljungskile
- 2005–2007: Aston Villa

Senior career*
Years	Team	Apps	(Gls)
2007–2009	Aston Villa	0	(0)
2007	→ Ljungskile (loan)	5	(1)
2008	→ Port Vale (loan)	6	(0)
2009–2011	Trollhättan	47	(6)
2011–2012	Ljungskile	47	(7)
2013–2018	Oddevold	98	(21)
2018–2020	Stenungsund		
2020–2022	Kongahälla		
2022–2023	Svenshögen		
2024–	Vallens IF		
- * Club domestic league appearances and goals as of 14 May 2018

Tobias Lars Mikaelsson (born 17 November 1988) is a Swedish footballer.

He started his professional career with Aston Villa in England in 2007. After loan spells with Ljungskile and Port Vale, he signed with Swedish side Trollhättan in 2009. Two years later, he joined Ljungskile. He joined Oddevold in February 2013 before signing with Stenungsund in January 2018. He joined Kongahälla in 2020 and Svenshögen in 2022.

== Career ==
=== Aston Villa ===
Mikaelsson signed for Aston Villa in August 2005 from Swedish Superettan side, Ljungskile – the team he also supports. He never played a game for the Villa senior team. Still, he made appearances at the youth level and for the Reserves, where he had a prolific goalscoring record. Mikaelsson was thought to have a very bright future ahead of him, some pundits had previously tipped him to become a star while he was at youth level, and follow the footsteps of his boyhood idols Zlatan Ibrahimović and Henrik Larsson. Mikaelsson joined his old club Ljungskile on loan on 15 March 2007 to gain first-team experience, and he scored one goal and provided five assists in the stint. On 18 September 2007, he scored his first hat-trick for Villa Reserves – in a 4–1 victory against Derby County. In January 2008, Mikaelsson joined Port Vale on a one-month loan deal, joining up with team-mate Chris Herd. He played six games for the League One club, Vale lost four and drew two games. After Mikaelsson returned to Villa Park following an ankle injury, Vale were relegated. In July 2008, Mikaelsson was rewarded with a one-year contract extension, keeping him at the club until the summer of 2009. He had a five-day trial with BK Häcken in January 2009. In April 2009, he had an unsuccessful trial at League One Hartlepool United following release from Aston Villa.

=== Sweden ===
Mikaelsson returned home to Sweden and signed for Trollhättan in July 2009. In his first season in the Superettan, Mikaelsson scored a single goal in 18 appearances for Trollhättan. During the 2010 season, Mikaelsson managed to score 5 goals in 29 appearances for the club, but was unable to help them avoid relegation. Mikaelsson opted to remain in the Superettan and transferred back to Ljungskile in March 2011. LSK finished in eighth place in 2011 and then in fifth place in 2012.

In February 2013, Mikaelsson signed for Division 1 Södra club IK Oddevold. The club finished second in 2013, but were beaten by Varbergs BoIS in the qualification play-offs. They finished in fifth place in 2014, fourth in 2015, and seventh in 2016. He scored two goals in 11 appearances during the 2017 season as the club finished in ninth place. In January 2018, Mikaelsson dropped down a level to sign a two-year contract with Division 2 side Stenungsund. The "Red Brothers" ended the 2018 season fifth in the Norra Götaland region. He signed with Division 4 side Kongahälla in 2020. He joined Svenshögen in 2022.

== Style of play ==
Mikaelsson said: "I like to think I'm an intelligent type of player with decent technique and decent pace." He is noted for his tall, powerful physique and sound technical ability.

== Career statistics ==
Appearances and goals by club, season and competition
Club	Season	League			National cup (Note: Includes FA Cup, Svenska Cupen)		League cup (Note: Includes EFL Cup)		Other		Total	
Club	Season	Division	Apps	Goals	Apps	Goals	Apps	Goals	Apps	Goals	Apps	Goals
Aston Villa	2006–07	Premier League	0	0	0	0	0	0	—		0	0
Aston Villa	2007–08	Premier League	0	0	0	0	0	0	—		0	0
Aston Villa	2008–09	Premier League	0	0	0	0	0	0	0	0	0	0
Aston Villa	Total		0	0	0	0	0	0	0	0	0	0
Ljungskile (loan)	2007	Superettan	5	1	0	0	—		0	0	5	1
Port Vale (loan)	2007–08	League One	6	0	—		—		—		6	0
Trollhättan	2009	Superettan	18	1	0	0	—		0	0	18	1
Trollhättan	2010	Superettan	29	5	2	1	—		0	0	31	6
Trollhättan	Total		47	6	2	1	0	0	0	0	49	7
Ljungskile	2011	Superettan	23	2	1	0	—		0	0	24	2
Ljungskile	2012	Superettan	24	5	1	1	—		0	0	25	6
Ljungskile	Total		47	7	2	1	0	0	0	0	49	8
Oddevold	2013	Division 1 Södra	25	7	0	0	—		2 (Note: Appearance(s) in the play-offs.)	0	27	7
Oddevold	2014	Division 1 Södra	24	4	0	0	—		0	0	24	4
Oddevold	2015	Division 1 Södra	17	6	0	0	—		0	0	17	6
Oddevold	2016	Division 1 Södra	22	3	0	0	—		0	0	22	3
Oddevold	2017	Division 1 Södra	10	1	1	1	—		0	0	11	2
Oddevold	Total		98	21	1	1	0	0	2	0	101	22
Career total (Note: Appearances for Stenungsund not known.)			203	35	5	3	0	0	2	0	210	38
