= Ödsmåls IK =

Swedish football club

- Full name: Ödsmåls Idrottsklubb
- Nickname(s): ÖIK
- Founded: 1939; 86 years ago
- Ground: Ödsmåls IP, Ödsmål
- League: Division 4 Bohuslän/Dalsland
Home colours

Ödsmåls IK is a Swedish football club located in Ödsmål. Their March 2020 calendar has been announced on their website.
