= Peter Abrahamsson =

Swedish footballer

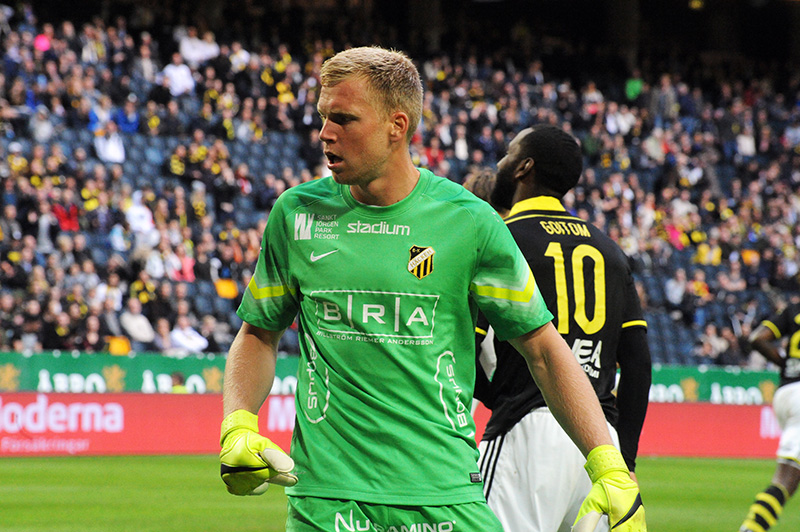

Personal information
- Full name: Peter Anders Abrahamsson
- Date of birth: 18 July 1988 (age 38)
- Place of birth: Jörlanda, Sweden
- Height: 1.90 m (6 ft 3 in)
- Position: Goalkeeper

Youth career
- –2004: Vallens IF
- 2005–2007: Örgryte IS

Senior career*
Years	Team	Apps	(Gls)
2007–2013	Örgryte IS	120	(0)
2014–2025	BK Häcken	231	(0)
Total		351	(0)

International career
2006–2007	Sweden U19	2	(0)
2017–2020	Sweden	2	(0)
- * Club domestic league appearances and goals

Peter Anders Abrahamsson (born 18 July 1988) is a Swedish former professional footballer who played as a goalkeeper. He played for Örgryte IS and BK Häcken.

== Honours ==
BK Häcken

- Allsvenskan: 2022
- Svenska Cupen: 2015–16, 2018–19, 2022–23, 2024–25
