= Munkedal railway station =

Railway station in Munkedal, Sweden

Coordinates: 58.4647°N 11.6778°E

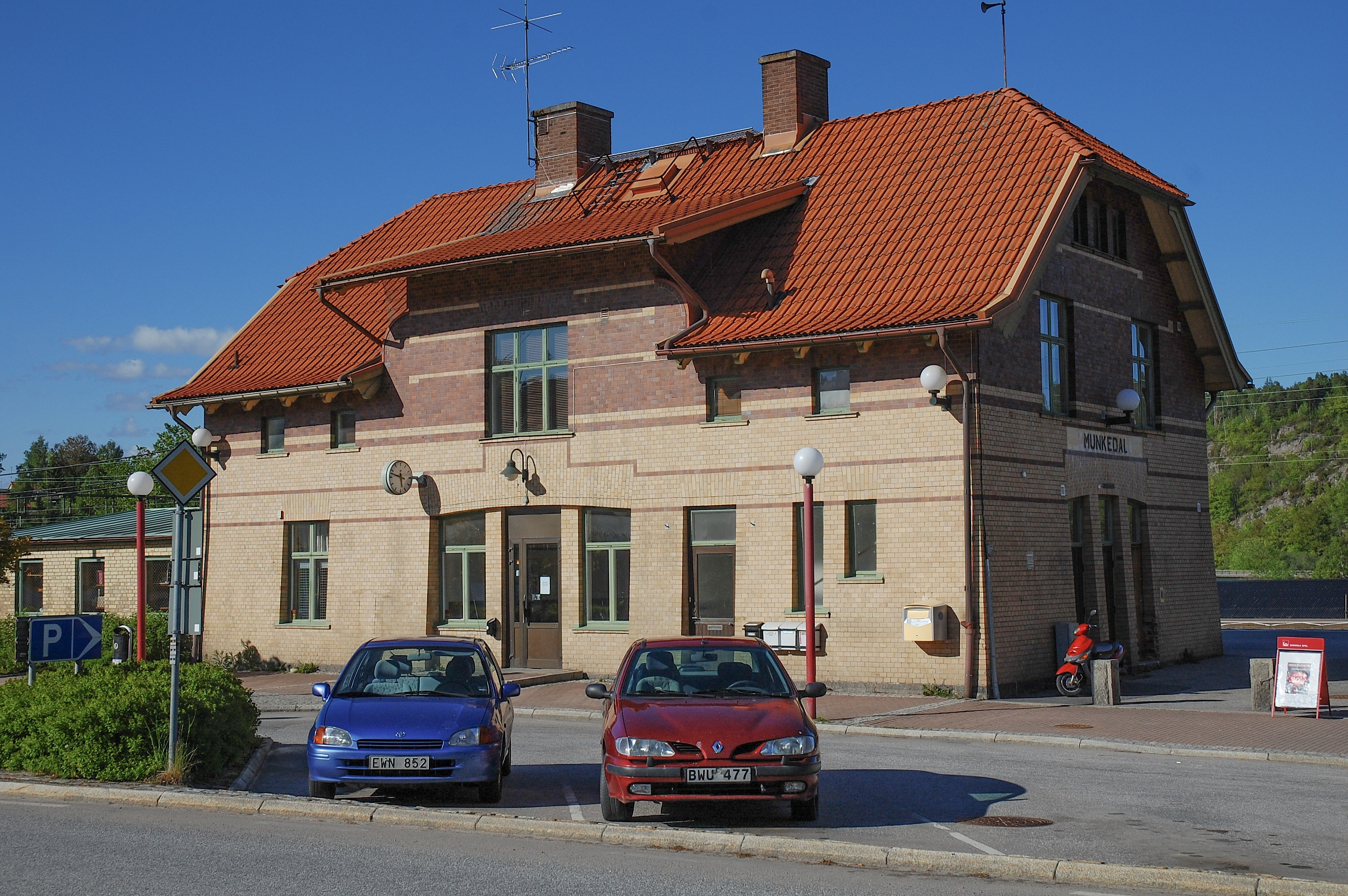
View of the station in late May 2010.

The Munkedal railway station is a Swedish railway station. It is located in Munkedal Municipality, Västra Götaland County, along the Bohus Line. The building was designed by SJ's chief architect Folke Zettervall and was inaugurated in connection with the opening of the Bohus Line in 1903.
