= Sävedalen =

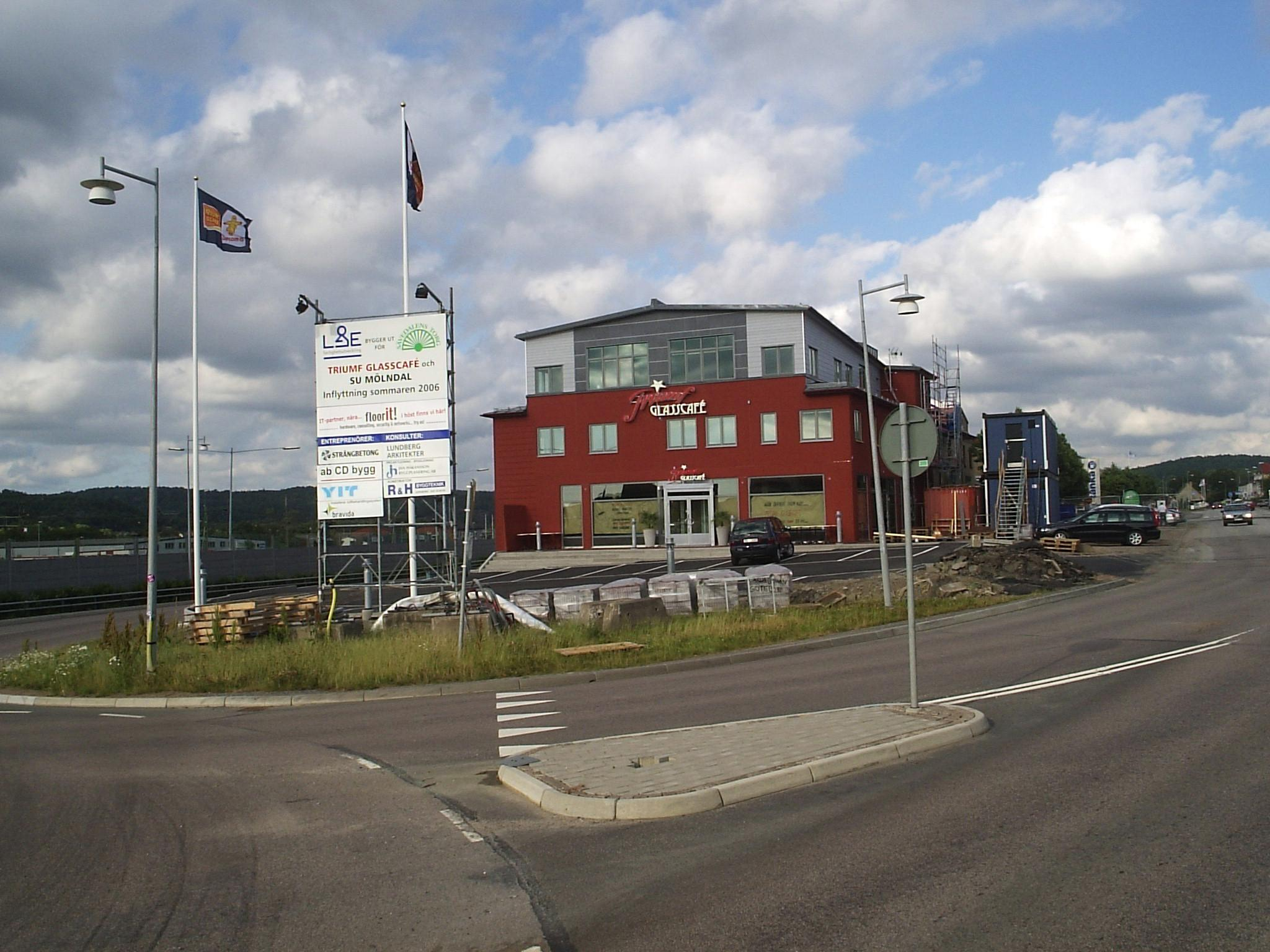
- Sävedalen

- Location within Västra Götaland Location within Sweden
- Coordinates: 57°43′57″N 12°04′25″E
- Country: Sweden
- Province: Västergötland
- County: Västra Götaland County
- Municipality: Partille Municipality

Population (31 December 2011)
  - Total: 11,946
- Time zone: UTC+1 (CET)
  - Summer (DST): UTC+2 (CEST)

Sävedalen is a district ("kommundel") located in Partille Municipality. At west it borders to Gothenburg Municipality and is a suburb of Gothenburg.

The ice-cream company Triumf Glass was founded and have their headquarters in Sävedalen.

== History ==
Earlier the village Ugglum was located here. But when the railway station was opened in 1917, it changed name to Sävedalen for avoiding confusion with Ucklum.

== Famous people ==
The comedian and tv-personality Petra Mede grew up in Sävedalen.

The Wrestler Johan Euren is a native of Savedalen
