= Stenungsön =

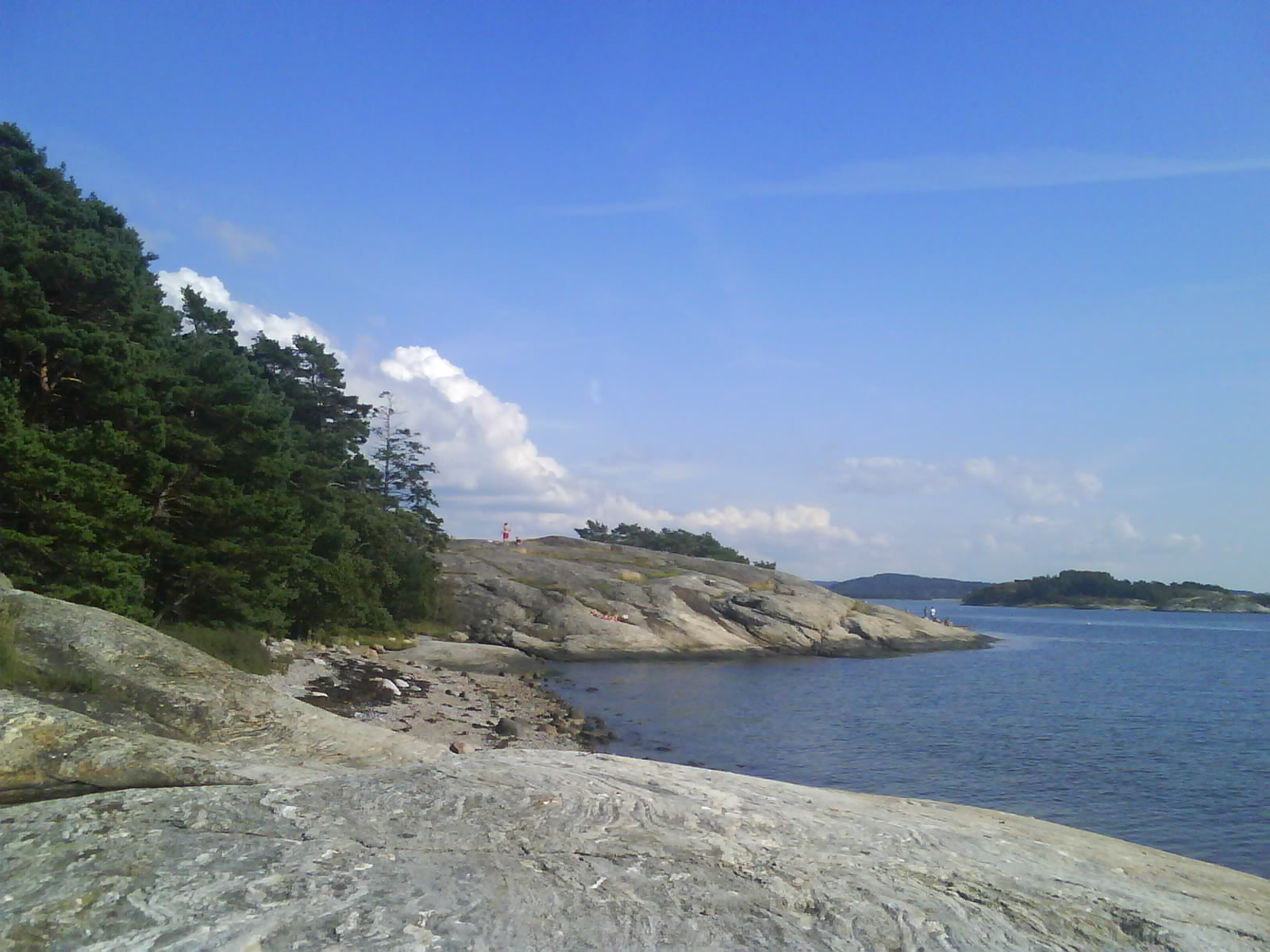

- Location within Västra Götaland Location within Sweden
- Coordinates: 58°04′N 11°48′E
- Country: Sweden
- Province: Bohuslän
- County: Västra Götaland County
- Municipality: Stenungsund Municipality

Area
  - Total: 0.55 km^{2} (0.21 sq mi)

Population (31 December 2010)
  - Total: 264
  - Density: 484/km^{2} (1,250/sq mi)
- Time zone: UTC+1 (CET)
  - Summer (DST): UTC+2 (CEST)

Stenungsön is an island and a locality situated in Stenungsund Municipality, Västra Götaland County, Sweden with 264 inhabitants in 2010.

== Location ==
Stenungsön is separate from the main town Stenungsund by a narrow strait. The distance to central Gothenburg is about 47 kilometers.
