= Aröd och Timmervik =

- Location within Västra Götaland Location within Sweden
- Coordinates: 57°58′N 11°47′E
- Country: Sweden
- Province: Bohuslän
- County: Västra Götaland County
- Municipality: Stenungsund Municipality and Kungälv Municipality

Area
  - Total: 1.48 km^{2} (0.57 sq mi)

Population (31 December 2010)
  - Total: 637
  - Density: 431/km^{2} (1,120/sq mi)
- Time zone: UTC+1 (CET)
  - Summer (DST): UTC+2 (CEST)

Aröd och Timmervik is a bimunicipal locality situated in Stenungsund Municipality and Kungälv Municipality in Västra Götaland County, Sweden. It had 637 inhabitants in 2010.
