= Starrkärr och Näs =

- Location within Västra Götaland Location within Sweden
- Coordinates: 57°56′N 12°06′E
- Country: Sweden
- Province: Bohuslän
- County: Västra Götaland County
- Municipality: Stenungsund Municipality

Area
  - Total: 1.02 km^{2} (0.39 sq mi)

Population (31 December 2010)
  - Total: 499
  - Density: 491/km^{2} (1,270/sq mi)
- Time zone: UTC+1 (CET)
  - Summer (DST): UTC+2 (CEST)

Starrkärr och Näs is a locality situated in Stenungsund Municipality, Västra Götaland County, Sweden with 499 inhabitants in 2010.
