= Hallerna =

- Location within Västra Götaland Location within Sweden
- Coordinates: 58°03′N 11°50′E
- Country: Sweden
- Province: Bohuslän
- County: Västra Götaland County
- Municipality: Stenungsund Municipality

Area
  - Total: 0.22 km^{2} (0.085 sq mi)

Population (31 December 2010)
  - Total: 668
  - Density: 3,036/km^{2} (7,860/sq mi)
- Time zone: UTC+1 (CET)
  - Summer (DST): UTC+2 (CEST)

Hallerna is a locality situated in Stenungsund Municipality, Västra Götaland County, Sweden with 668 inhabitants in 2010.
