= Svartehallen =

- Location within Västra Götaland Location within Sweden
- Coordinates: 58°07′N 11°58′E
- Country: Sweden
- Province: Bohuslän
- County: Västra Götaland County
- Municipality: Stenungsund Municipality

Area
  - Total: 0.22 km^{2} (0.085 sq mi)

Population (2005-12-31)
  - Total: 201
  - Density: 902/km^{2} (2,340/sq mi)
- Time zone: UTC+1 (CET)
  - Summer (DST): UTC+2 (CEST)

Svartehallen is a village situated in Stenungsund Municipality, Västra Götaland County, Sweden with 201 inhabitants in 2005.
