= Svenshögen =

- Location within Västra Götaland Location within Sweden
- Coordinates: 58°09′N 11°56′E
- Country: Sweden
- Province: Bohuslän
- County: Västra Götaland County
- Municipality: Stenungsund Municipality

Area
  - Total: 0.43 km^{2} (0.17 sq mi)

Population (31 December 2010)
  - Total: 421
  - Density: 985/km^{2} (2,550/sq mi)
- Time zone: UTC+1 (CET)
  - Summer (DST): UTC+2 (CEST)

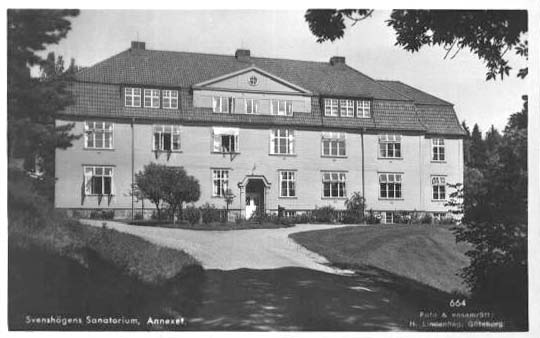
Svenshögens Sanatorium, Annex

Svenshögen is a locality situated in Stenungsund Municipality, Västra Götaland County, Sweden with 421 inhabitants in 2010.
