= Ödsmål =

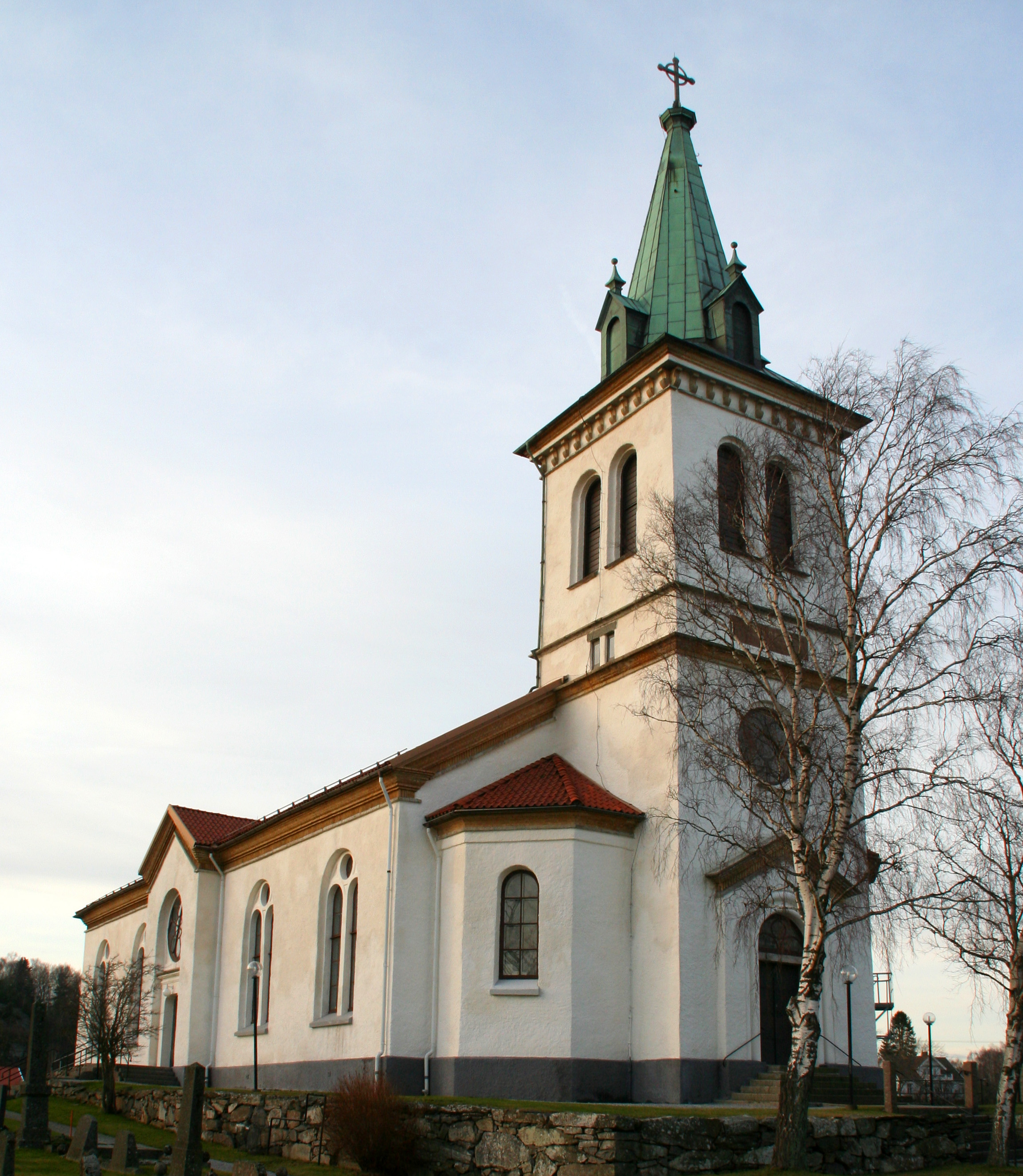
- Ödsmål church

- Location within Västra Götaland Location within Sweden
- Coordinates: 58°07′N 11°52′E
- Country: Sweden
- Province: Bohuslän
- County: Västra Götaland County
- Municipality: Stenungsund Municipality

Area
  - Total: 0.85 km^{2} (0.33 sq mi)

Population (31 December 2010)
  - Total: 608
  - Density: 712/km^{2} (1,840/sq mi)
- Time zone: UTC+1 (CET)
  - Summer (DST): UTC+2 (CEST)

Ödsmål is a locality situated in Stenungsund Municipality, Västra Götaland County, Sweden with 608 inhabitants in 2010.
