= Stora Höga =

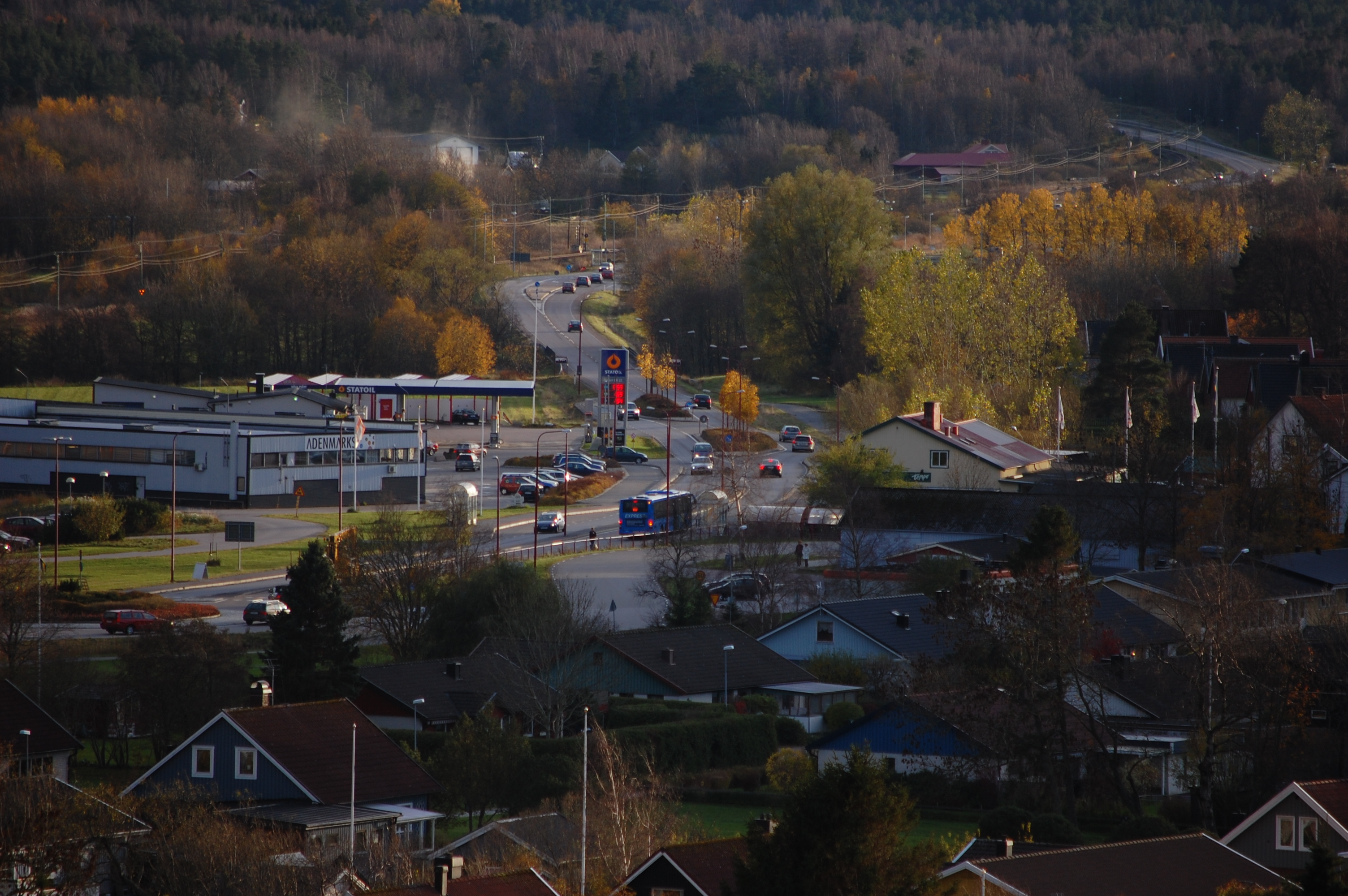

- Location within Västra Götaland Location within Sweden
- Coordinates: 58°01′N 11°50′E
- Country: Sweden
- Province: Bohuslän
- County: Västra Götaland County
- Municipality: Stenungsund Municipality

Area
  - Total: 2.43 km^{2} (0.94 sq mi)

Population (31 December 2010)
  - Total: 2,751
  - Density: 1,134/km^{2} (2,940/sq mi)
- Time zone: UTC+1 (CET)
  - Summer (DST): UTC+2 (CEST)

Stora Höga is a locality situated in Stenungsund Municipality, Västra Götaland County, Sweden with 2,751 inhabitants in 2010.

Stora Höga is part of the Jörlanda parish in Stenungsund, and is situated between a railroad station originally known as Vallen. The Vallen railroad station later changed its name to Stora Höga after a nearby farm by the same name. Some of the other original farms in the old Stora Höga are Lilla Höga, Anrås, and Bråland.

On the ocean side is an old steam boat pier known as Getskär, nowadays used as a dock for small boats and also with a small beach that is popular during the summer months.

During the mid- and late 2000s, Stora Höga has expanded rapidly leading to an influx of new residents. The rapid expansion has led to some social conflicts in recent time, with many personal bankruptcies and foreclosures on homes that the owners couldn't really afford.

Two simultaneous motorcycle gang-related murders in 2009, where the bodies were found in Stora Höga, received national media attention.

== Landmarks ==
In nearby Anrås, including where the Anråse å stream/river meets the ocean, there are several ancient burial mounds and other archaeological artifacts. The name Anrås is believed to be a combined word from "Oln" which means "growing, flooded" and "os" (river mouth). The name "Oln" is believed to be the original name for the river/stream, and Anrås would thus mean "the outlet of Oln".

Parts of Anrås have been declared of national interest due to archaeological artifacts and overall landscape. Maps and photos from the area can be found in a report (in Swedish) published by Stenungsund municipality in 2016.
