= Ucklum =

- Location within Västra Götaland Location within Sweden
- Coordinates: 58°05′N 11°57′E
- Country: Sweden
- Province: Bohuslän
- County: Västra Götaland County
- Municipality: Stenungsund Municipality

Area
  - Total: 0.30 km^{2} (0.12 sq mi)

Population (31 December 2010)
  - Total: 255
  - Density: 851/km^{2} (2,200/sq mi)
- Time zone: UTC+1 (CET)
  - Summer (DST): UTC+2 (CEST)

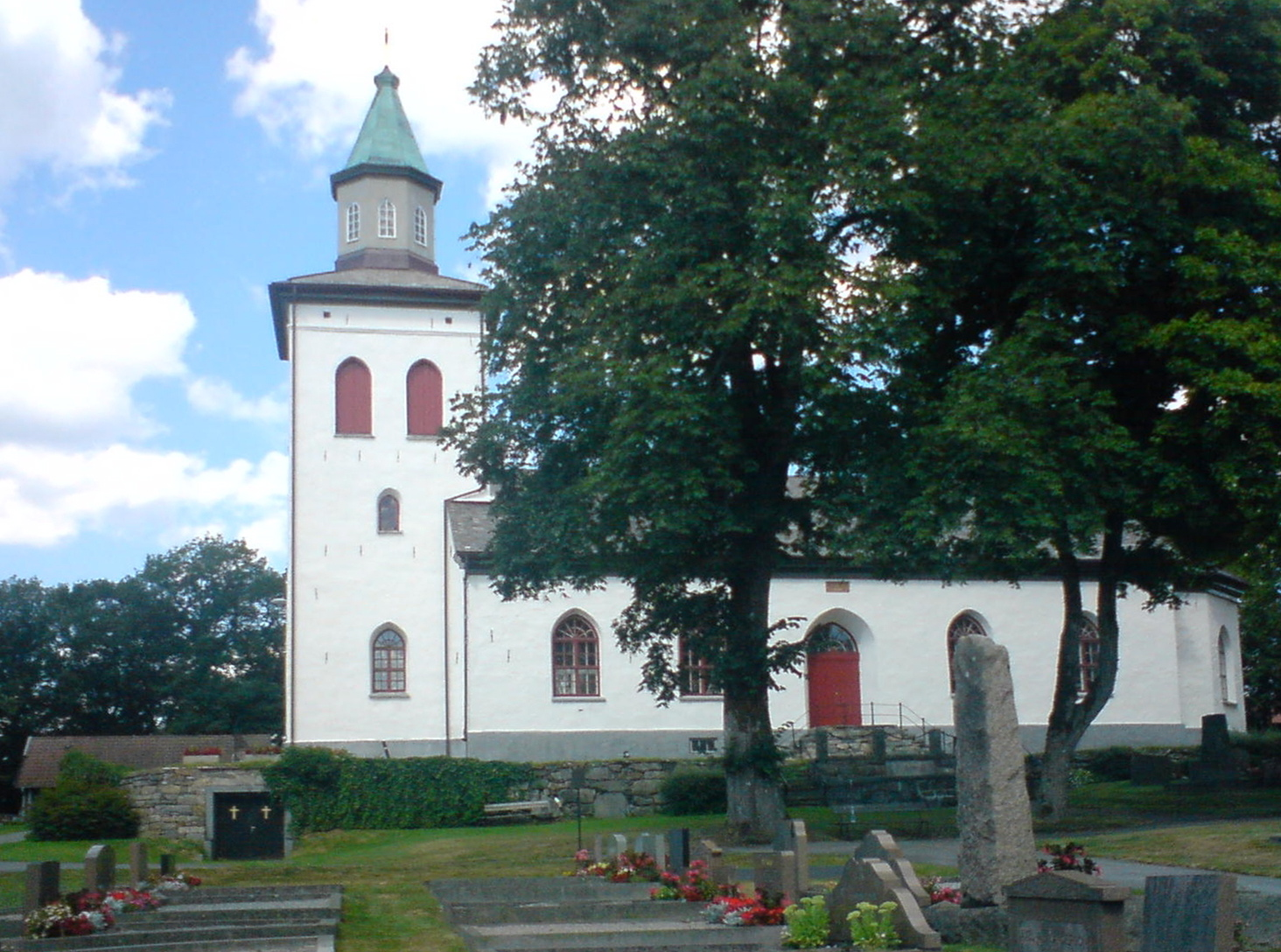
Ucklums kyrka, the parish church of Ucklum, Sweden. View is from the south.

Ucklum is a locality situated in Stenungsund Municipality, Västra Götaland County, Sweden with 255 inhabitants in 2010.

In Ucklum there is a beach, Bastevik, which is used a lot in the summer. It also has a local mountain called Ucklumberget.

Lättklinker Cement AB and Hercules have their workers in Ucklum.
