= Vallens IF =

Swedish football club

- Full name: Vallens Idrottsförening
- Founded: 1958
- Ground: Stora Höga IP; Stora Höga; Sweden
- Chairman: Marith Rutgersson
- League: Division 4 Bohuslän/Dalsland
Home colours	Away colours

Vallens IF is a Swedish football club located in Stora Höga.

== Background ==
Vallens IF men's team currently plays in Division 4 Bohuslän/Dalsland which is the sixth tier of Swedish football. The women's team is currently playing in Division 2. They play their home matches at the Stora Höga IP in Stora Höga, Stenungsund Municipality.

The club is affiliated to Bohusläns Fotbollförbund. Vallens IF have competed in the Svenska Cupen on 3 occasions and have played 5 matches in the competition.

== Season to season ==
Season	Level	Division	Section	Position	Movements
1998	Tier 5	Division 4	Bohuslän/Dalsland	1st	Promoted
1999	Tier 4	Division 3	Nordvästra Götaland	5th	
2000	Tier 4	Division 3	Nordvästra Götaland	7th	
2001	Tier 4	Division 3	Nordvästra Götaland	3rd	
2002	Tier 4	Division 3	Nordvästra Götaland	2nd	Promotion Playoffs
2003	Tier 4	Division 3	Nordvästra Götaland	11th	Relegated
2004	Tier 5	Division 4	Bohuslän/Dalsland	2nd	Promotion Playoffs
2005	Tier 5	Division 4	Bohuslän/Dalsland	1st	Promoted
2006*	Tier 5	Division 3	Nordvästra Götaland	12th	Relegated
2007	Tier 6	Division 4	Bohuslän/Dalsland	12th	Relegated
2008	Tier 7	Division 5	Bohuslän/Dalsland	1st	Promoted
2009	Tier 6	Division 4	Bohuslän/Dalsland	6th	
2010	Tier 6	Division 4	Bohuslän/Dalsland	2nd	Promotion Playoffs
2011	Tier 6	Division 4	Bohuslän/Dalsland	3rd	

* League restructuring in 2006 resulted in a new division being created at Tier 3 and subsequent divisions dropping a level.
