= Tjörn Runt =

Annual long distance sailing competition

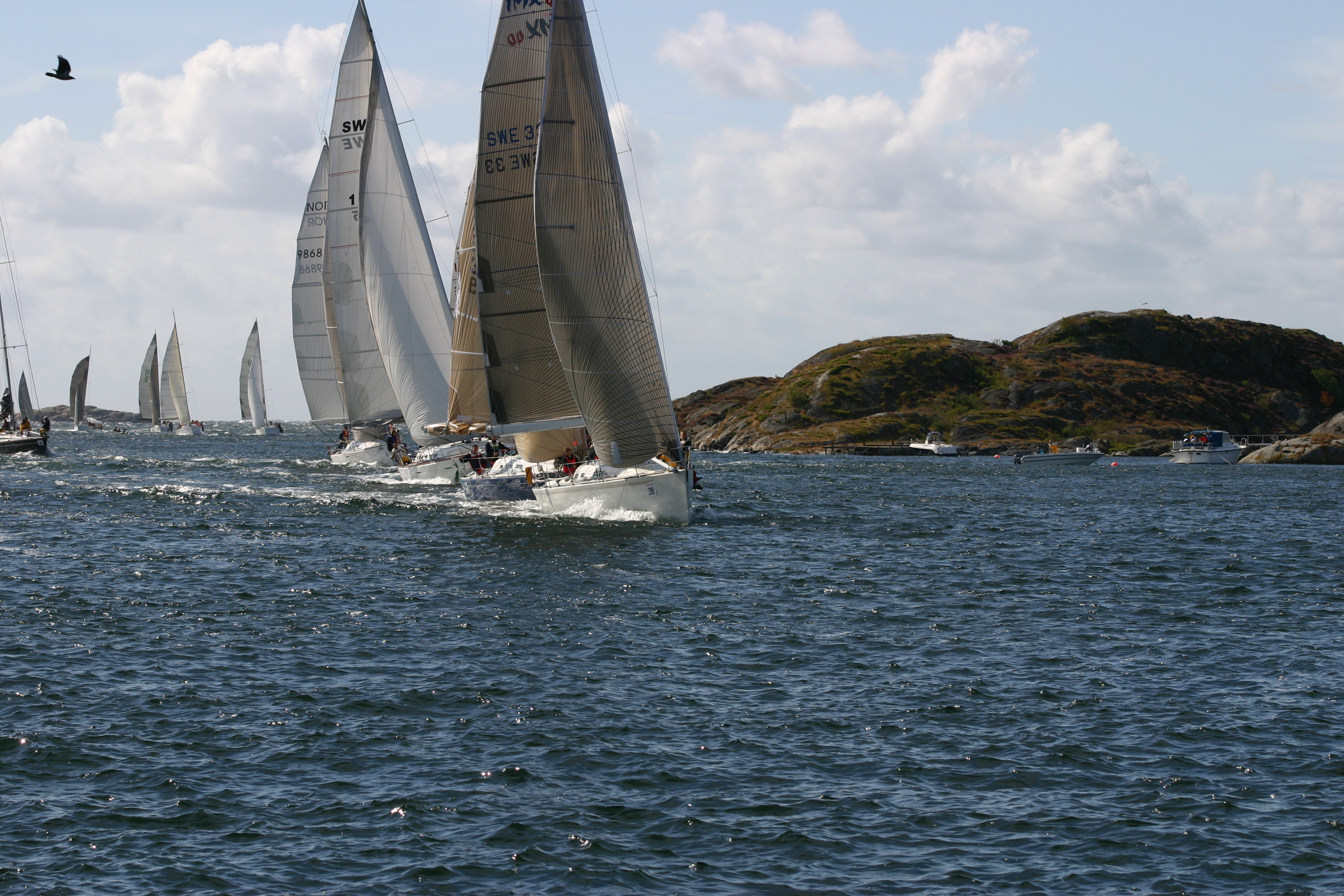
- 2003 Tjörn Runt
- First held: 1963
- Organizer: Stenungsunds Segelsällskap

Tjörn Runt is an annual long distance sailing competition that takes place in Sweden around the island of Tjörn. The race has been held on the third Saturday of August every year since 1963. About 1,000 sailing boats sail the 28 nautical miles (52 km) around Tjörn each year. Tjörn Runt is arranged by Stenungsunds Segelsällskap.

== Course ==
The start takes place with start in Stigfjorden 2013 and the race proceeds counterclockwise around the island, with the finishing line in Askeröfjorden outside Stenungsön.
