= Munkedal =

Munkedal, Sweden
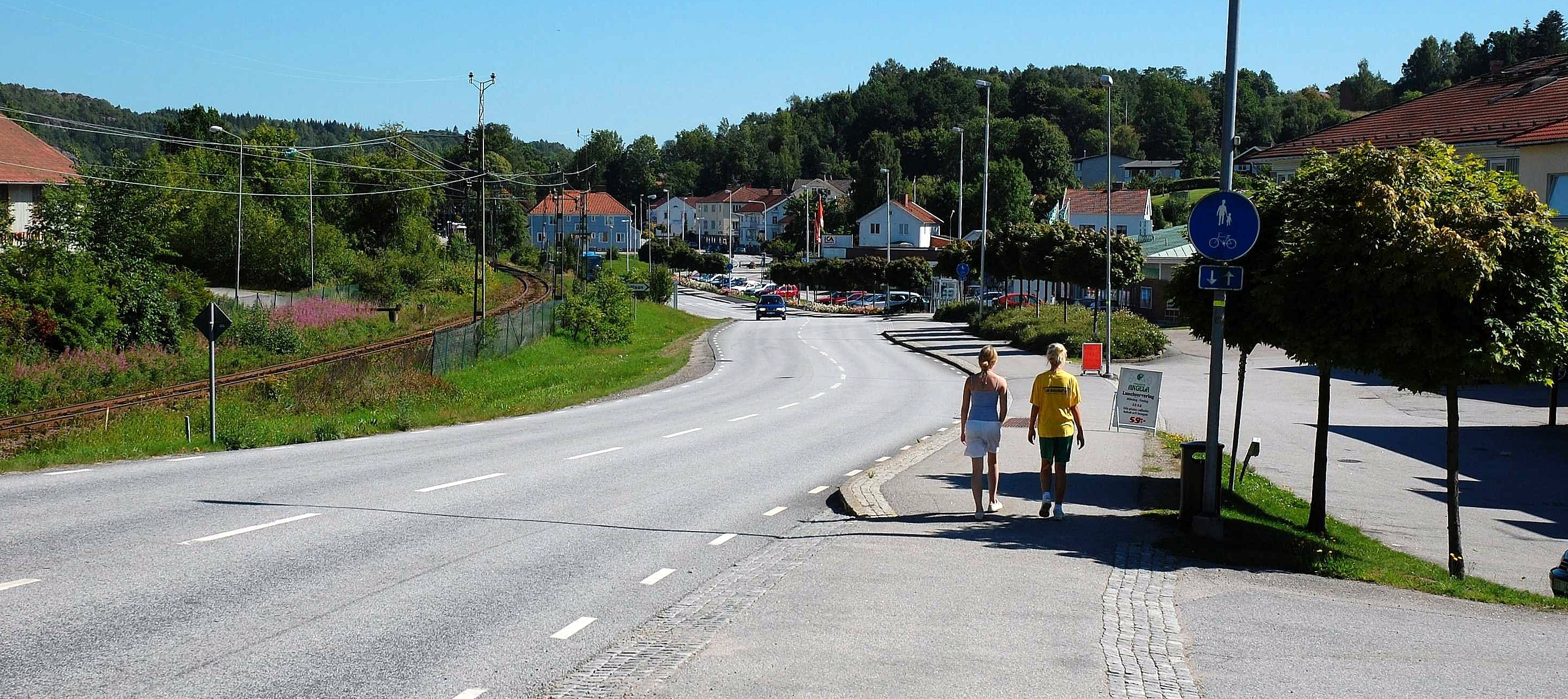
- Central Munkedal

- Location within Västra Götaland Location within Sweden
- Coordinates: 58°29′N 11°41′E
- Country: Sweden
- Province: Bohuslän
- County: Västra Götaland County
- Municipality: Munkedal Municipality

Area
  - Total: 5.41 km^{2} (2.09 sq mi)

Population (31 December 2010)
  - Total: 3,718
  - Density: 687/km^{2} (1,780/sq mi)
- Time zone: UTC+1 (CET)
  - Summer (DST): UTC+2 (CEST)

Munkedal is a locality and the seat of Munkedal Municipality, Västra Götaland County, Sweden with 3,718 inhabitants in 2010. Joakim Andersson, an ice hockey player for the Detroit Red Wings, grew up in Munkedal. Olympian Erland Koch was born here. The Battle of Kvistrum took place near the town.
