= Jörlanda =

- Location within Västra Götaland Location within Sweden
- Coordinates: 57°59′N 11°50′E
- Country: Sweden
- Province: Bohuslän
- County: Västra Götaland County
- Municipality: Stenungsund Municipality

Area
  - Total: 0.67 km^{2} (0.26 sq mi)

Population (31 December 2010)
  - Total: 789
  - Density: 1,182/km^{2} (3,060/sq mi)
- Time zone: UTC+1 (CET)
  - Summer (DST): UTC+2 (CEST)

Jörlanda is a locality situated in Stenungsund Municipality, Västra Götaland County, Sweden with 789 inhabitants in 2010.
