= Gothenburg archipelago =

Swedish islands in the Kattegat

Archipelago of Gothenburg
Native name: Göteborgs skärgård
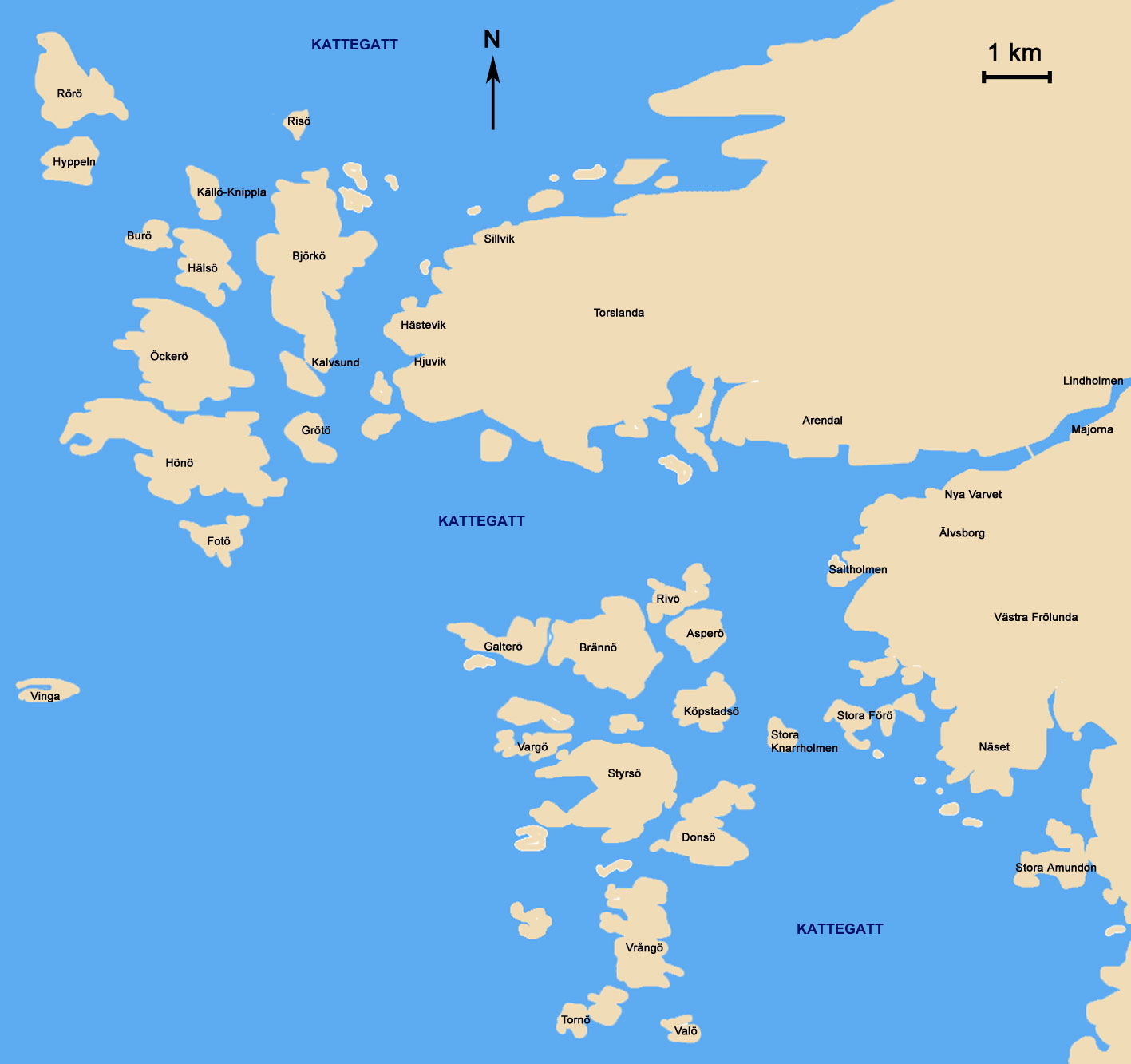
- Archipelago of Gothenburg
- Interactive map of Archipelago of Gothenburg

Geography
- Location: Kattegat
- Coordinates: 57°37′N 11°47′E

Administration
- Sweden

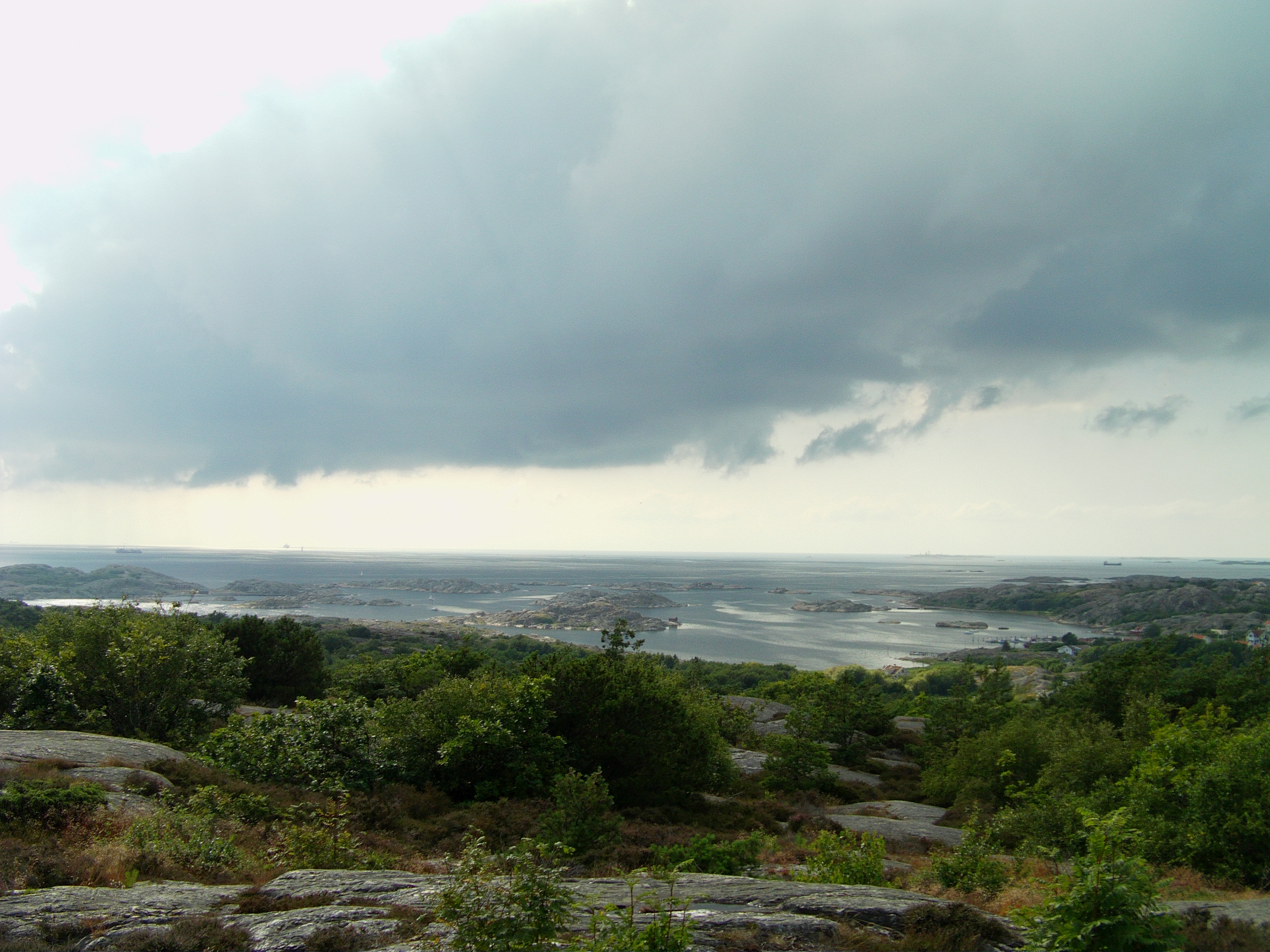
Panoramic view across the Archipelago of Gothenburg (Göteborgs skärgård).

The archipelago of Gothenburg (Swedish: Göteborgs skärgård) comprises northern and southern archipelagoes in the Kattegat. The southern archipelago is part of Gothenburg municipality located in the province of Västergötland while the northern archipelago is Öckerö municipality, located in the province of Bohuslän.

== Northern archipelago ==
The main islands of the northern Gothenburg archipelago are:

- Björkö
- Fotö
- Grötö
- Hyppeln
- Hälsö
- Hönö
- Kalvsund
- Källö-Knippla
- Rörö
- Öckerö

== Southern archipelago ==
The southern Gothenburg archipelago lies off the coast of Gothenburg, Sweden's second-largest city. It has 5,000 permanent and another 6,000 summer residents. The archipelago is completely car free. Transportations is carried out by means of cycles, delivery mopeds, electric cars and ferries.

In the Norse sagas, it was called Elfarsker (the river islets), as the river Göta älv had its estuary there. The islands appear to have been famous as a location for holmgangar during the Viking Age.

Sagas where the location appears:

- Örvar-Odds saga
- Bósa saga ok Herrauðs
- Þorsteins saga Víkingssonar

One of the islands, Brännö, is described as an important location for fairs in the Laxdæla saga, and it is also considered to be the likely location of Breca and the Brondings of the Anglo-Saxon poems Widsith and Beowulf.

- Köpstadsö is often called Kössö. It is a small island with narrow footpaths. Not even mopeds are allowed here. The name of the island implies trading.
- Styrsö: during the 1830s the Öberg family established a guesthouse there. This was the start of a bathing resort, which expanded rapidly with the start of steamboats in 1867.
- Donsö is an important fishing and ship-owning community. The harbour is the center of the island. It is surrounded by 20th century fishing facilities.
- Vargö has been a nature reserve since 1986. The varied sea landscape offers a diversity of flora. It is a good place to see razorbills, woodland birds, gulls and eiders.
- Vrångö is the southernmost inhabited island with a small town centre and a hiking route round both the north and south of the island.

== Transport ==
The northern archipelago is accessible by car ferries operated by Trafikverket, departing from Lilla Varholmen to islands like Hönö and Björkö. Some islands are interconnected by road bridges, facilitating vehicle traffic.

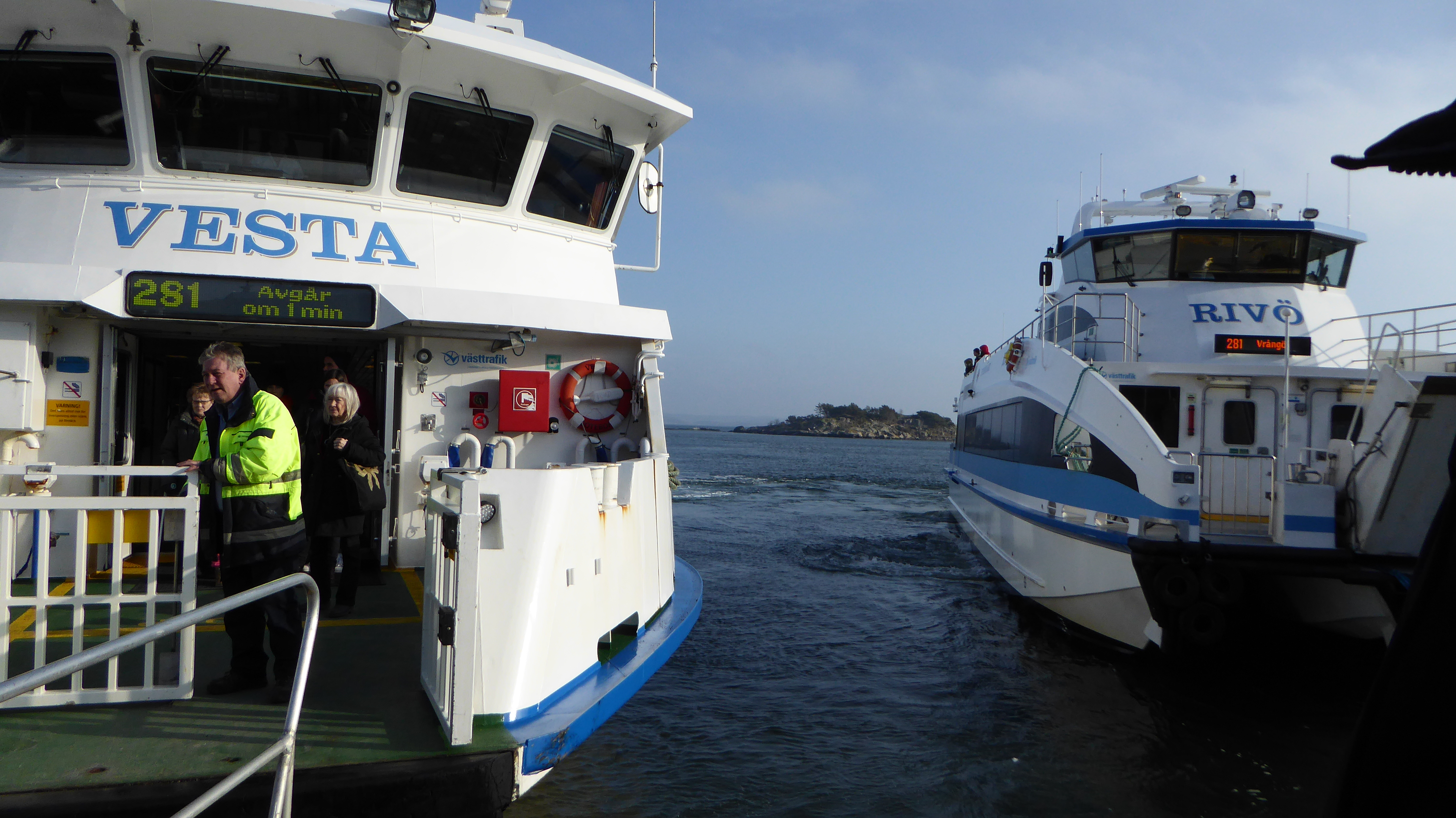
Styrsöbolaget ferries arriving at the island of Styrsö

In the southern archipelago, transportation is operated by Styrsöbolaget, a subsidiary of Transdev Sverige, under contract with Västtrafik, the regional public transport authority. Ferries depart year-round from Saltholmen, with additional departures from Stenpiren Travel Centre in central Gothenburg. Routes serve islands such as Asperö, Brännö, Styrsö, Donsö, and Vrångö.

Ferries are integrated into the public transport system, allowing passengers to use the same tickets as for buses and trams. Bicycles are permitted on board when space allows.

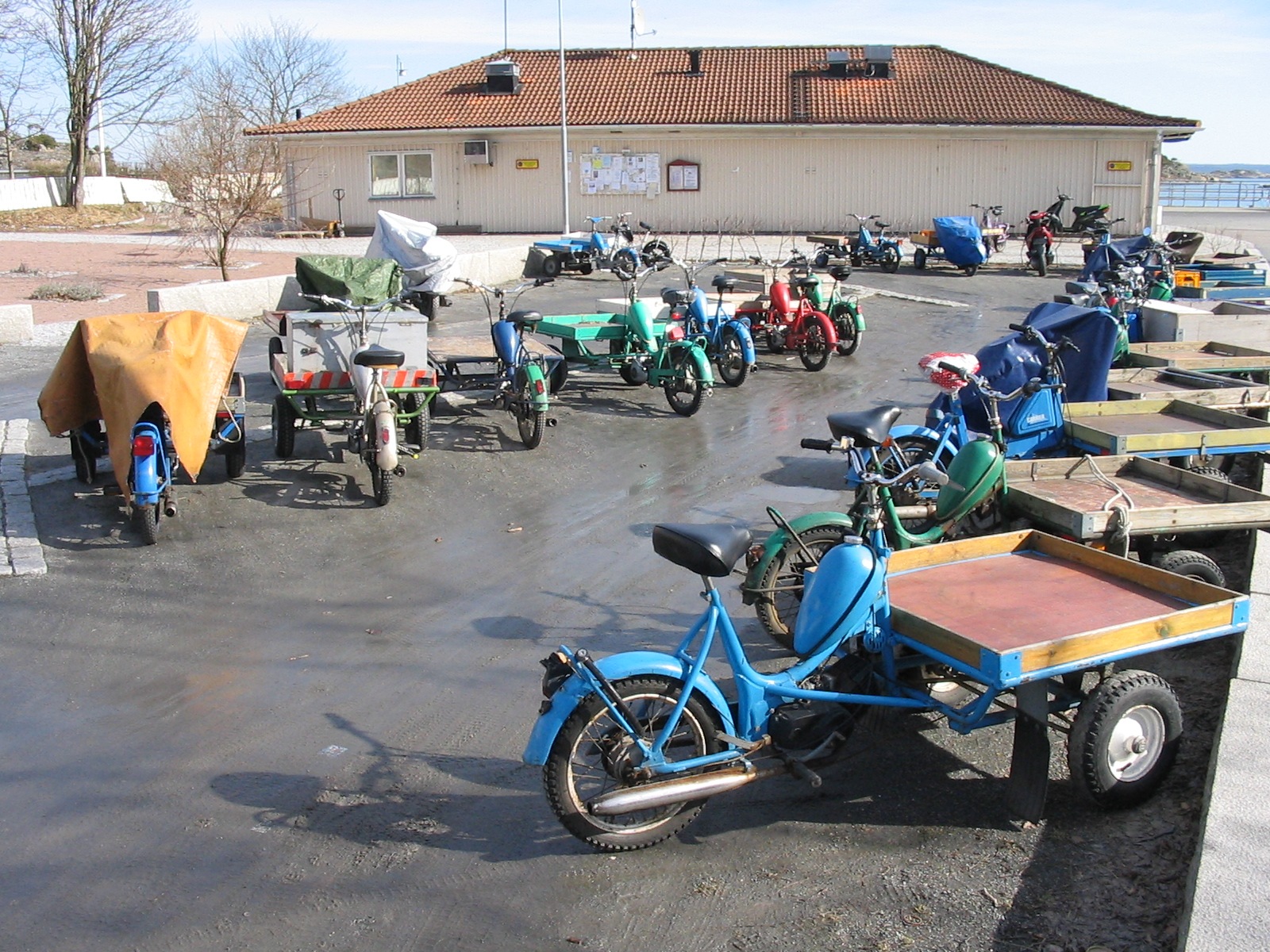
Flakmopeds

In contrast to the northern archipelago, the use of motor vehicles in the south is restricted, with most people using flakmopeds (flatbed mopeds, small service scooters with a cargo bed). An exception to this is Köpstadsö, where even mopeds are banned. Instead, residents primarily rely on wheelbarrows for transporting items.
