= List of islands by name (V) =

This article features a list of islands sorted by their name beginning with the letter V.

== V ==
Island's Name	Island group(s)	Country/Countries
Väddö och Björkö		Sweden
Værøya	Lofoten, Nordland	Norway
Vágar	Faroe Islands	Denmark
Vahanga	Acteon Group, Tuamotus, French Polynesia	Overseas collectivity of France
Vahitahi	Tuamotu Archipelago, French Polynesia	Overseas collectivity of France
Väike-Pakri	Pakri Islands	Estonia
Vaila	Shetland Islands	Scotland
Île aux Vainqueurs	Saint-Pierre and Miquelon	Overseas collectivity of France
Vairaatea	Tuamotu Archipelago, French Polynesia	Overseas collectivity of France
Valcour	Lake Champlain, New York	United States
Valdes	Gulf Islands, British Columbia	Canada
Valentia		Ireland
Île Valhuec	Morbihan, Brittany	France
Vanavana	Tuamotu Archipelago, French Polynesia	France
Vancouver	British Columbia	Canada
Vandruff	Rock River, Illinois	United States
Vanna	Karlsøy	Norway
Vanua Lava	Banks Islands	Vanuatu
Vardim	Danube River	Bulgaria
Vargö	Southern Gothenburg Archipelago	Sweden
Värmdön	Stockholm archipelago	Sweden
Vassøy	Øyane archipelago, Stavanger Municipality	Norway
Vatersay	Outer Hebrides	Scotland
Vega	The Vega Archipelago, Nordland	Norway
Vejrø	North of Lolland	Denmark
Vementry	Shetland Islands	Scotland
Ven		Sweden
Vendsyssel-Thy	Jutland Peninsula	Denmark
Ventotene	Pontine Islands	Italy
Veránka-sziget	Danube River	Hungary
Verde	Ribatejo islands	Portugal
Île Verdelet	Sept Îles, Bretagne	France
Île Verte	Saint-Pierre and Miquelon	Overseas collectivity of France
Île Verte	Îles des Embiez (La Ciotat)	France
Île Verte	Gironde estuary	France
Île Verte	Archipel de Molène, Brittany	France
Île Verte	Peros Banhos, Chagos Archipelago	British Indian Ocean Territory
Île Verte	Gulf of Saint Lawrence, Quebec	Canada
Vestvågøya	Lofoten, Nordland	Norway
Vétaounde	Banks Islands	Vanuatu
Victoria	Nunavut	Canada
Victoria	Lagos	Nigeria
Viðoy	Faroe Islands	Denmark
Vikna	Nærøysund Municipality, Trøndelag	Norway
Vilm	Baltic Sea	Germany
Vilsandi	Baltic Sea	Estonia
Vimy	Lake Huron, Ontario	Canada
Vincent		United States
Île Violette	Kerguelen Islands, French Southern and Antarctic Lands	France
Vis	Adriatic Sea	Croatia
Visingsö	Lake Vättern	Sweden
Vivara	Flegree Islands	Italy
Vivian Island	Nunavut	Canada
Vlieland	West Frisian Islands	Netherlands
Vohilaid	Väinameri Sea	Estonia
Volvo Island	Illinois	United States
Voorne-Putten	South Holland	Netherlands
Vormsi	West Estonian archipelago; Baltic Sea	Estonia
Vostok	Line Islands	Kiribati
Ostrov Vrangelya	Chukotka Autonomous Okrug	Russia
Vrångö	Southern Gothenburg Archipelago	Sweden
Vulcano	Aeolian Islands	Italy
Vamizi Island	Quirimbas Islands	Mozambique

== See also ==
- List of islands (by country)
- List of islands by area
- List of islands by population
- List of islands by highest point
