= Hönökaka =

Swedish flat bread

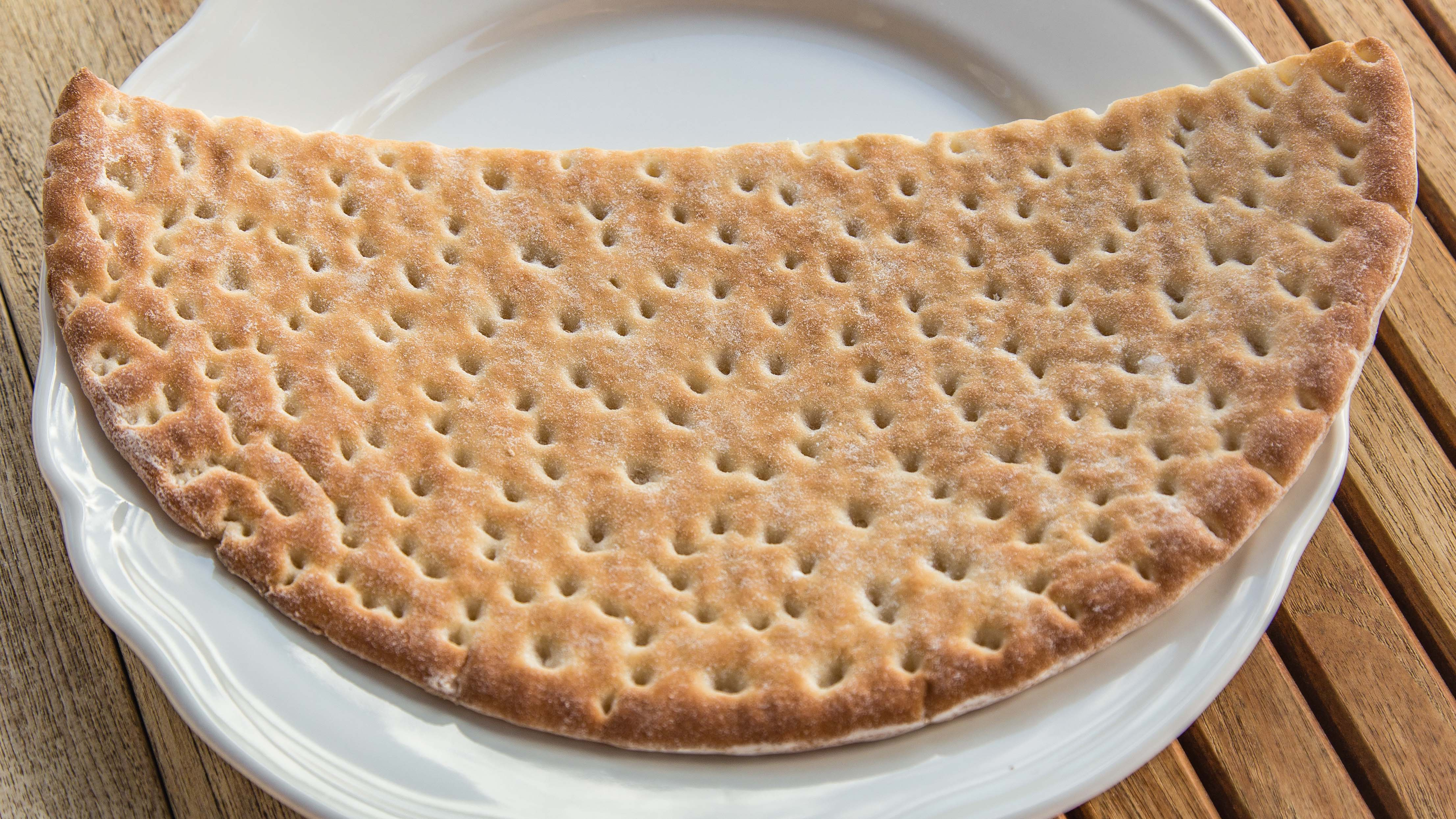
- Industrial made hönökaka
- Type: Bread
- Course: Main course, side dish, or snack
- Place of origin: Sweden
- Region or state: Gothenburg archipelago
- Cooking time: 1 hour 35 min to 1 hour 55 min
- Serving temperature: Cold
- Main ingredients: Wheat and/or rye flour; Yeast; Water; Salt
- Food energy (per 112 g serving): 295 kcal (1,230 kJ)Pågen.se
Nutritional value
(per 112 g serving)
- Protein: 9.7 g
- Fat: 3.6 g
- Carbohydrate: 53.8 g

Hönökaka (English: Hönö bread or Hönö cake) is a type of Swedish flat soft white pricked bread. It is named after the island town Hönö in Gothenburg's northern archipelago, and was originally baked by the people living on said archipelago's different islands. The bread is baked in round flat pieces, but is usually sold as half-circles. In 2014, industrially made hönökaka was produced by two manufactures, Åkes Äkta Hönökakor and Pågen.

Åke "Grytens-Karl" Johannesson began his bakery business in Hönö in 1934, and moved his operations to Torslanda in 1960.

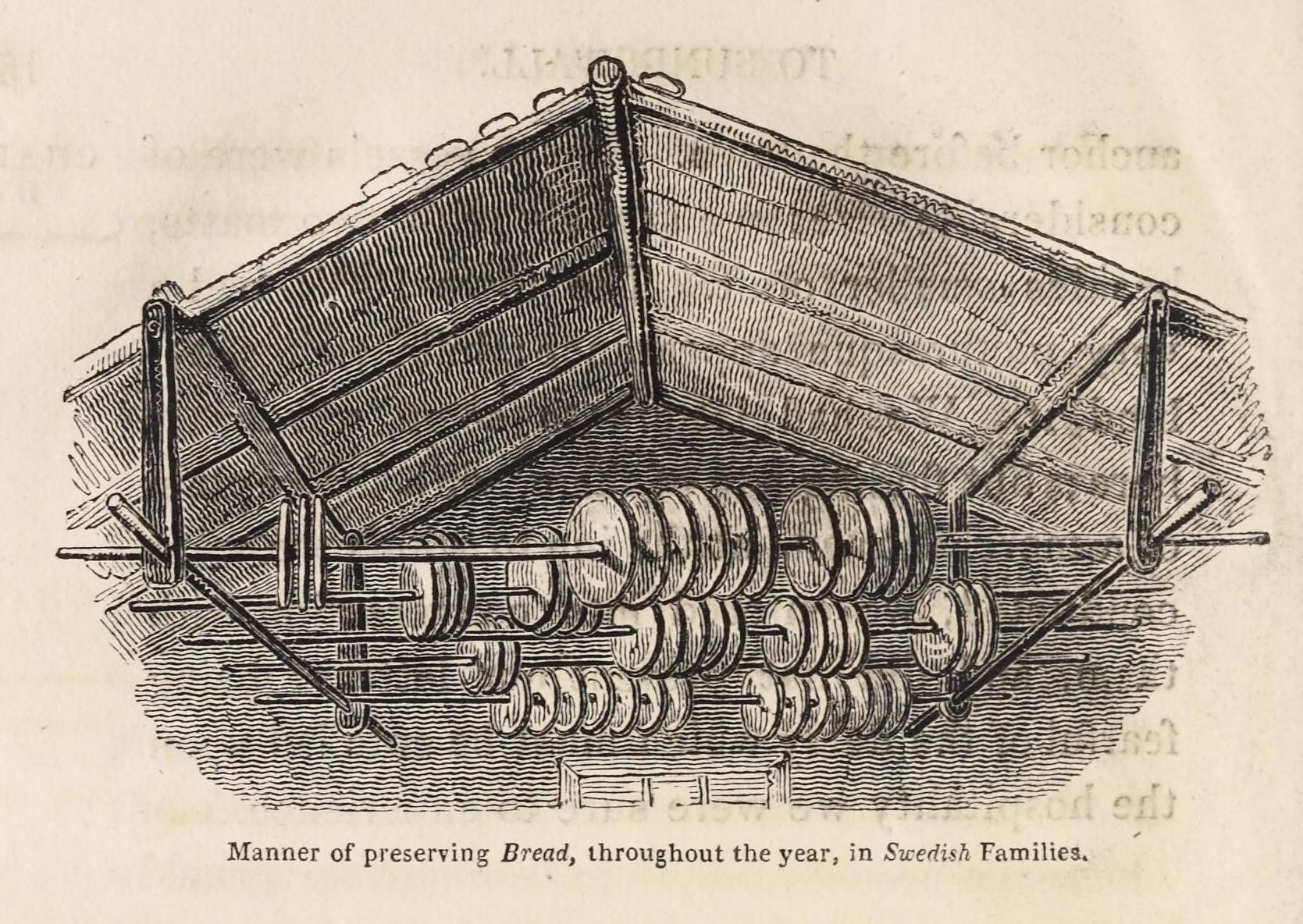
Hönökaka was stored in the same way as crispbread.

The bread was baked on Hönö by the area's fishing and farming families. The flatbread was easy to store and eat during fishing trips on the sea. Just as with crispbread, the hönökaka was holed so that they could be hung from the rafters on poles. The bread was stored for a long time and was often eaten even after it gone stale and hard. Homemade hönökaka is usually slightly firmer than industrially baked.
