= Johanna Hård =

Swedish pirate

Johanna Hård née Jungberg (3 December 1789 – 12 March 1851), was a Swedish pirate.

== Life ==
She was the daughter of farmer tenant Sven Haraldsson Jungberg (1763-1830) and Anna Britta Nilsdotter (1761-1825) in Hisingen in Gothenburg. In 1813, she married bookkeeper Fredrik Hård (1776-1817). As a widow, she lived on Vrångö Island. She had difficulty supporting herself as a widow, and was once arrested for smuggling after having sailed to Copenhagen and sold textiles against the custom regulations. In 1822, she was put on trial after being accused of murdering her newborn child, but freed after an investigation proved the child to have been stillborn.

In 1823, she was put on trial along with her servant Anders Andersson, boatswain Johan Andersson Flatås from Gothenburg (the spouse of her paternal aunt), fisher Christen Andersson, and his servant Carl Börjesson from Styrsö. They were accused of having attacked, plundered, and killed the crew of the Danish ship Frau Mette, which had been found plundered at Fotö and its crew slain. Hård denied all charges, but her co-accused testified that, while Hård had not been present during the attack on the ship, they had planned the act in her home, with her as the leading figure and brain behind the whole plot. Hård wrote a letter to her father asking him to testify to her favor and specifically to confirm that her servant Andersson had been at her home at the time of the attack; when the authorities confiscated the letter and asked her about them, she claimed to have written them during temporary insanity and confusion.

Johan Andersson Flatås, Anders Andersson, and Christen Andersson were beheaded for piracy and murder in 1824, and Carl Börjesson (d. 1835) was sentenced to forced labor. The evidence against Hård was insufficient for a verdict against her denial, and she was therefore released. She was confirmed to have lived in Stockholm from 1825, where she called herself a sea captain's widow. Apparently she managed to hide her past and eventually secured a position within the Royal Post Office, where she had a good reputation. She died in a charity hospital in Stockholm in 1851.

== Legacy ==
Johanna Hård was remembered in popular memory as one of two images; as the hardened criminal who persuaded her lover to abandon his honest profession to become a pirate; or as the poor destitute widow who did what she could to support herself.

== Sources ==
- Folke Danbratt, Strandad jakt (Vetlanda 1963).
- Kindgren, Marianne; Tingdal, Birgitta. Johanna Hård - En sjörövarhistoria. Tre Böcker (2013).
- Danbratt, Folke; Odenvik Nathan (1966). Styrsö socken: ur dess historia från forntid till nutid. Styrsö: Styrsö kommun. Libris 720346
- Fredberg, Carl Rudolf A:son (1977[1919]). Det gamla Göteborg: lokalhistoriska skildringar, personalia och kulturdrag. Lund: Ekstrand. Libris 7640796. ISBN 91-7408-015-6 (inb.)
- Harrison, Dick (2007). ”Kvinnorna som blev pirater: två kvinnliga sjörövare står fram i vår historia : kaparredaren Ingela Gatenhielm och piratdrottningen Johanna Hård : båda visade att brott kan löna sig!”. Svenska turistföreningens årsbok "2007,": sid. 24-35. 0283-2976. ISSN 0283-2976. Libris 10633193
- Kroman, ”Fanøsømænd i Storm och Stille (Esbjerg 1936).
- Lager, Göran & Ersatz: Döden i skogen. Svenska avrättningar och avrättningsplatser. (2006)
- Johanna Hård at Svenskt kvinnobiografiskt lexikon
