= Hjuvik =

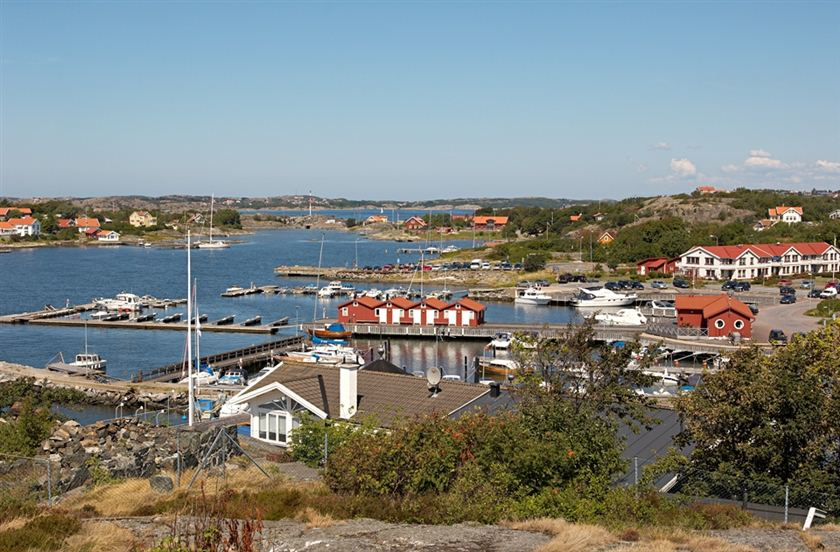
- Hjuviks Harbour

- Location within Västra Götaland Location within Sweden
- Coordinates: 57°42′N 11°43′E
- Country: Sweden
- Province: Bohuslän
- County: Västra Götaland County
- Municipality: Göteborg Municipality

Area
  - Total: 2.79 km^{2} (1.08 sq mi)

Population (31 December 2010)
  - Total: 3,928
  - Density: 1,408/km^{2} (3,650/sq mi)
- Time zone: UTC+1 (CET)
  - Summer (DST): UTC+2 (CEST)

Hjuvik is a locality situated in Göteborg Municipality, Västra Götaland County, Sweden. It had 3,928 inhabitants in 2010 in an area of 279,01 hectares. It is situated in the south west corner of Hisingen, north west of the oil refineries.

Hjuvik consists mainly of villas, and the area is seen as exclusive due to its scenic location. From the hilltops one has a view of the North Sea. The ferry terminal to the Öckerö islands, located on Lilla Varholmen, is connected to Hjuvik via an embankment/road. The eastern parts of Hjuvik are dominated by an ex-military area now owned by Myrsjöhus construction and development company. The Torslanda Battery used to be stationed in the military area with a measuring station and two 24mm canons in armoured towers.

Hjuvik used to be a fishing community with herring salting houses and train oil distillation houses. Remnants of this era can be seen on the island of Smedmansholmen west of Hjuvik where a number of foundations and old jetties can be found. The only remaining herring salting house left in region is located on the nearby island of Kalven (Kalvsund) in Öckerö Municipality. Settlement was previously rather sparse but since the Second World War more and more summerhouses were constructed in the area. The local farmers sold unfarmable land on the hillsides.

In the 1960s many more villas were built. Most summerhouses have been made into permanent dwellings and a school has been constructed.
