= Donsö =

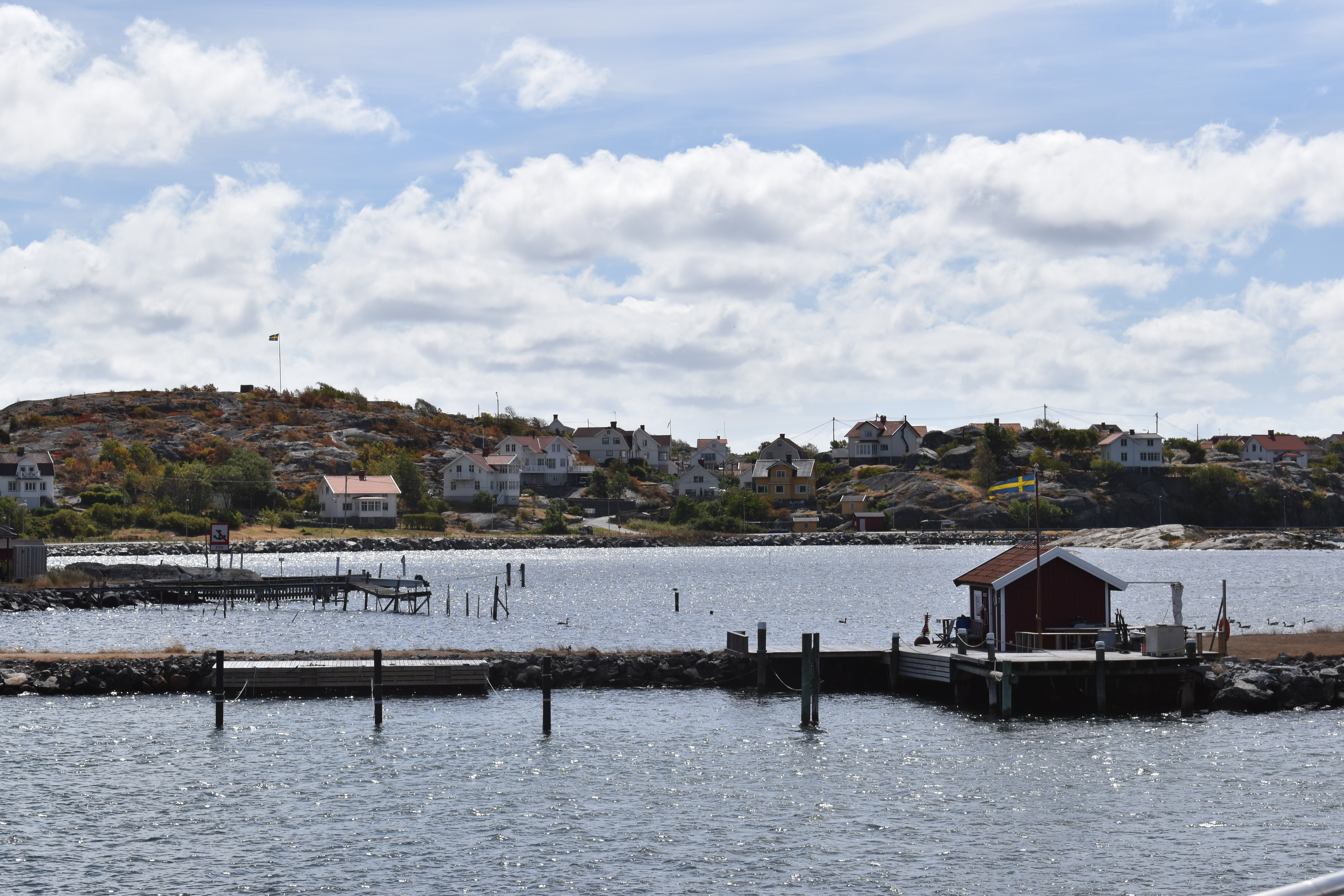
- Donsö, as seen from the sea

- Location within Västra Götaland Location within Sweden
- Coordinates: 57°36′N 11°48′E
- Country: Sweden
- Province: Västergötland
- County: Västra Götaland County
- Municipality: Göteborg Municipality

Area
  - Total: 0.97 km^{2} (0.37 sq mi)

Population (31 December 2010)
  - Total: 1,407
  - Density: 1,451/km^{2} (3,760/sq mi)
- Time zone: UTC+1 (CET)
  - Summer (DST): UTC+2 (CEST)

Donsö (Swedish pronunciation: [ˈdûːnsøː]) is a small island in the Southern Gothenburg Archipelago and a locality situated in Gothenburg Municipality, Västra Götaland County, Sweden. It had 1,407 inhabitants in 2010. The local covenant church on Donsö has approximately 500 members.

== Sports ==
The following sports clubs are located in Donsö:

- Donsö IS

== Shipping ==
Donsö has a long history of shipping, especially in tanker businesses. The following companies are located or owned by people living on Donsö.

- Donsötank
- Furetank
- Veritas Tankers
- Sirius Rederi
- Swedia Rederi
- Tärntank
- Älvtank
- GotShip (OljOla)
- Donsö Bunker Service
- Kiltank Rederi AB
- BunkerTell Rederi
- Northern Offshore Services

== Neighboring inhabited Islands ==
- Styrsö
- Vrångö
- Sjumansholmen
