= Hyppeln =

Island in Sweden

Coordinates: 57.76°N 11.61°E

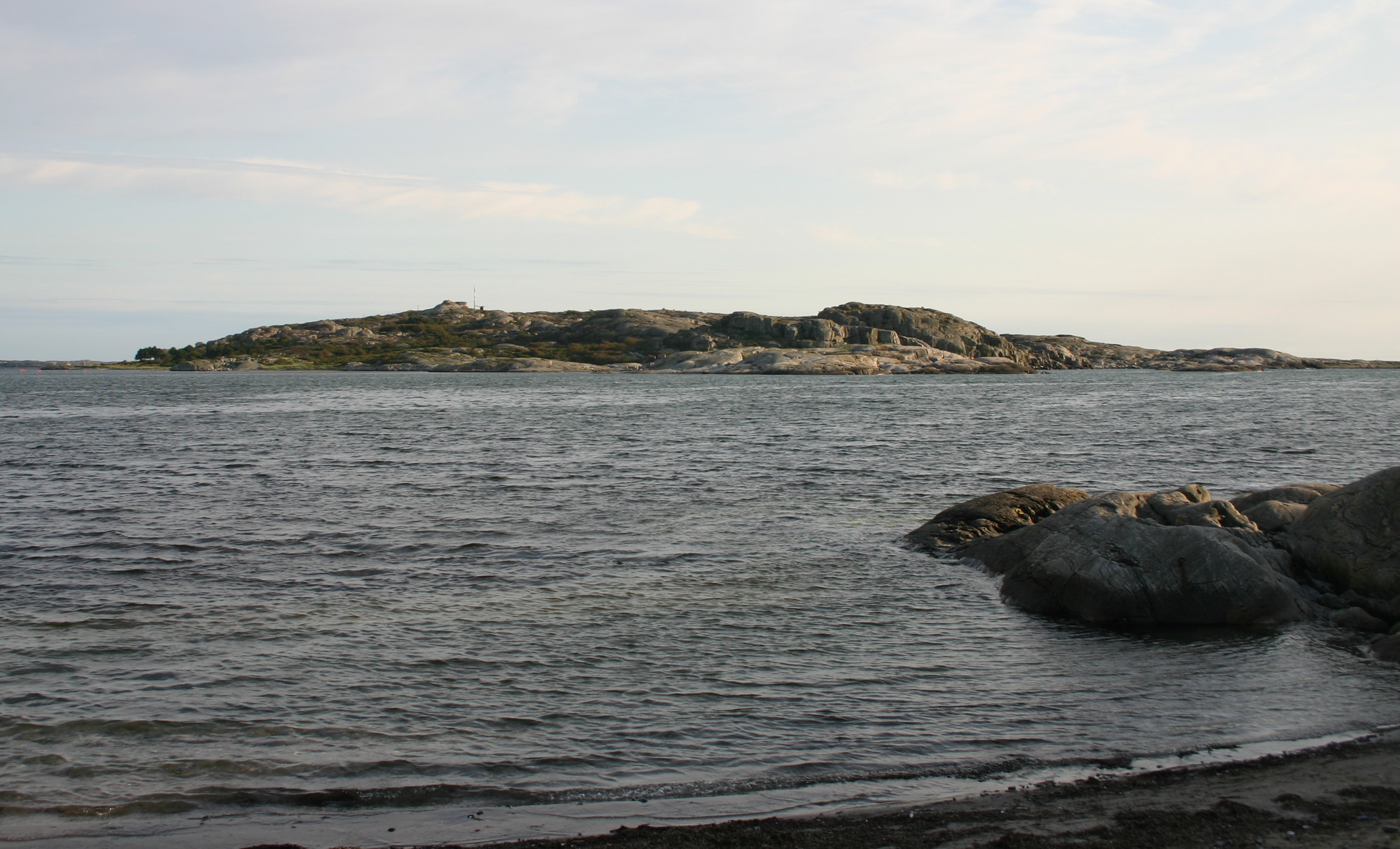
Hyppeln, an island in the Gothenburg northern archipelago

Hyppeln is a Swedish island in the archipelago of Gothenburg, part of Öckerö Municipality. It is about 1.5 kilometres (0.9 mi) long. To reach Hyppeln, visitors must take a car ferry from Lilla Varholmen to Hönö. Then, they can use a personal car or ride a bus to the ferry terminal. The island is home to many seabirds.

"Hyppeln" is also the name of the village on the island, which has about 150 permanent residents.

The island has a selection of points of interest to visitors. Man-made structures include a sauna, grocery store, and guest harbour. The guest harbor features 60 open spots and has a depth of 2.5-3.5m, and is the location of other amenities such as a restrooms and a laundry room. There is also a rocky hiking trail, which is 3km long and takes 1-2 hours to complete. The trail features an old military fort as well as a point where one can see across the land - 'Jättehuvudet'.
