= Felicia Schröder =

Swedish footballer (born 2007)

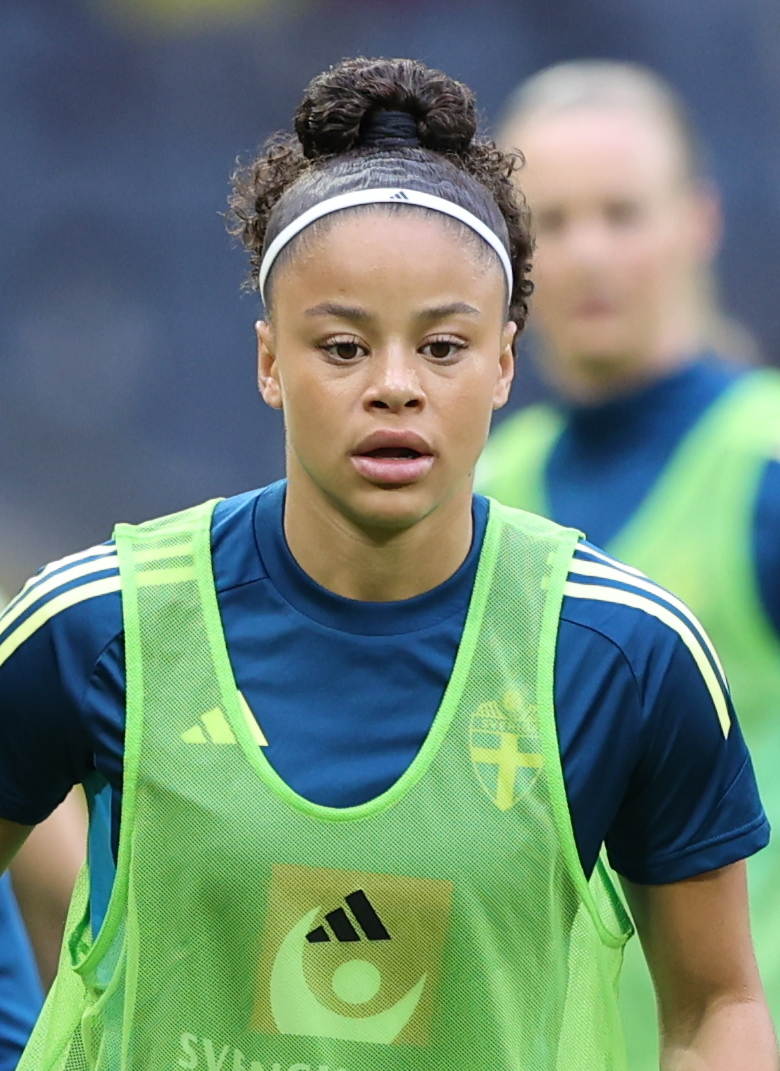
- Schröder with Sweden in 2026

Personal information
- Full name: Felicia Maria Shakira Schröder
- Date of birth: 13 April 2007 (age 19)
- Place of birth: Bohus-Björkö, Sweden
- Position: Forward

Team information
- Current team: Real Madrid
- Number: 12

Youth career
- –2022: IFK Björkö

Senior career*
Years	Team	Apps	(Gls)
2023	BK Häcken II	7	(6)
2023–2026	BK Häcken	72	(49)
2026–	Real Madrid	9	(8)

International career^{‡}
2022–2024	Sweden U17	16	(9)
2024–2025	Sweden U19	6	(6)
2024–2025	Sweden U23	6	(4)
2025–	Sweden	13	(5)
- * Club domestic league appearances and goals as of 21 November 2026 ‡ National team caps and goals as of 13 October 2026

Felicia Maria Shakira Schröder (Swedish: [fɛˈliːsɪa maˈriːa ʃaˈkiːra ˈskrøːdɛr]; born 13 April 2007) is a Swedish professional footballer who plays as a striker for Liga F club Real Madrid and the Sweden national team.

== Early life ==
Schröder was born on 13 April 2007 in Bohus-Björkö in Öckerö Municipality, Västra Götaland County. She was born to a Jamaican father and a Swedish mother, who met each other whilst in Jamaica.

== Club career ==
=== BK Häcken ===
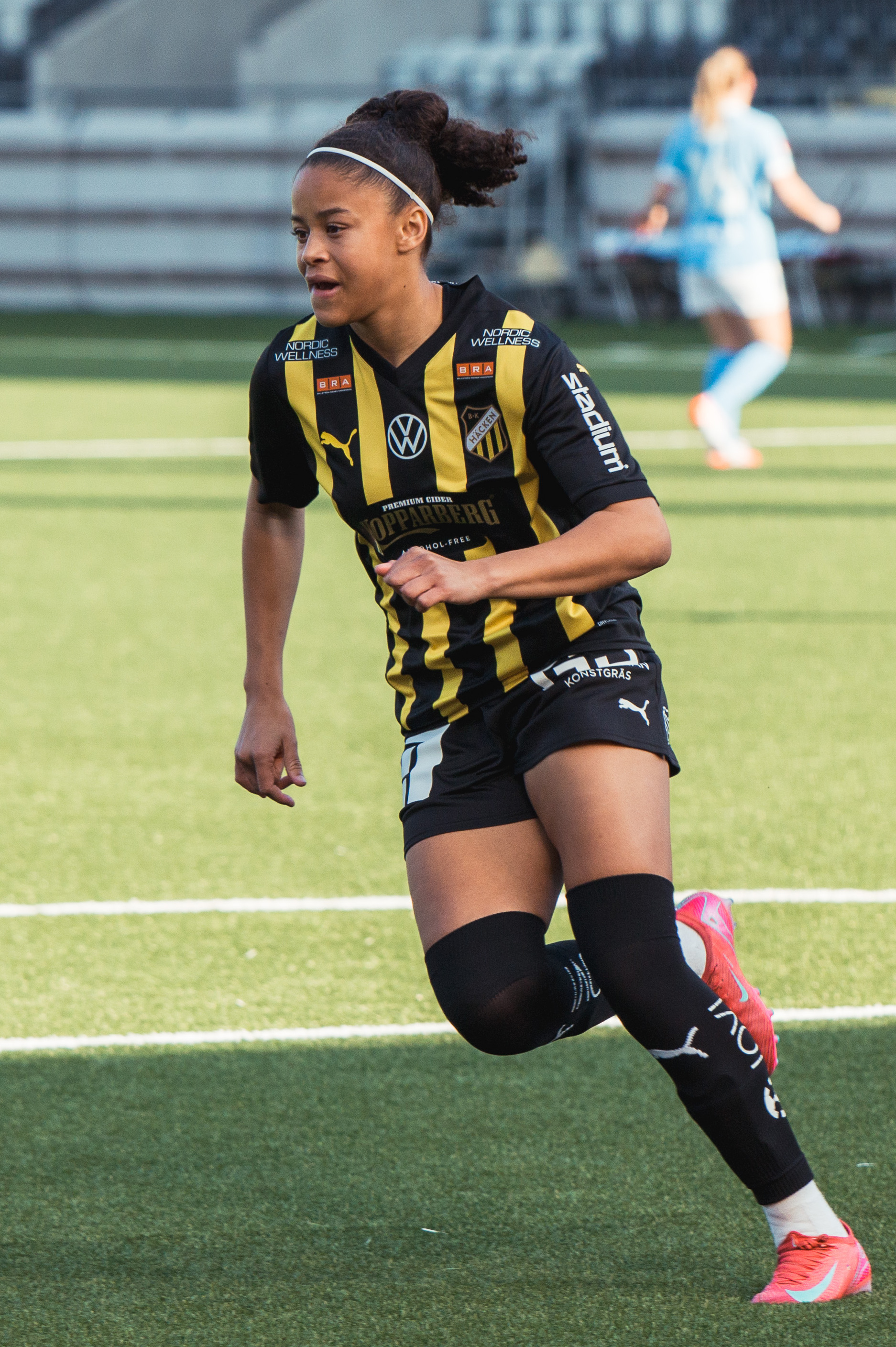
Schröder playing for BK Häcken in 2023.

On 5 April 2023, Schröder signed a three year A team contract with BK Häcken, after training with BK Häcken in the fall and playing for IFK Björkö. On 27 April 2023, she was brought on as a substitute for Rosa Kafaji, making her league debut for the club, and scored in the 90th+6th minute, becoming the first player born in 2007 to score a goal in the Damallsvenskan. In October 2023, Schröder scored her first goal in the UEFA Women's Champions League against FC Twente.

=== Real Madrid ===
On 23 June 2026, Schröder signed with Liga F club Real Madrid for a potentially world record transfer fee.

== International career ==
In August 2022, Schröder was called up to the Sweden U15s for a training tournament in Norway.

In July 2023, Schröder was selected in the Swedish U16s for the Nordic Cup, and scored four goals in three matches, becoming the top scorer of the Swedish team in the tournament.

Schröder made her international debut for the senior side against Italy on 30 May 2025, starting the match before being substituted off for Kosovare Asllani in the 62nd minute.

On October 9 2026 Schröder scored her first senior side goal, scoring a penalty in the 24th minute against Lithuania in the European playoffs for the 2027 Women's World Cup . Schröder went on to score a hattrick in the match.

== Career statistics ==
=== International ===
As of match played 13 October 2026

Appearances and goals by national team and year
National team	Year	Apps	Goals
Sweden	2025	5	0
Sweden	2026	8	5
Total		13	5

As of match played 13 October 2026
Scores and results list Sweden's goal tally first, score column indicates score after each Schröder goal.

No.	Date	Venue	Opponent	Score	Result	Competition
1	9 October 2026	Darius and Girėnas Stadium, Kaunas, Lithuania	Lithuania	1–0	5–0	2027 FIFA Women's World Cup qualification
2	9 October 2026	Darius and Girėnas Stadium, Kaunas, Lithuania	Lithuania	2–0	5–0	2027 FIFA Women's World Cup qualification
3	9 October 2026	Darius and Girėnas Stadium, Kaunas, Lithuania	Lithuania	3–0	5–0	2027 FIFA Women's World Cup qualification
4	13 October 2026	Nationalarenan, Stockholm, Sweden	Lithuania	5–0	10–0	2027 FIFA Women's World Cup qualification
5	13 October 2026	Nationalarenan, Stockholm, Sweden	Lithuania	6–0	10–0	2027 FIFA Women's World Cup qualification

== Honours and awards ==
BK Häcken

- Damallsvenskan: 2025
- UEFA Women's Europa Cup: 2025–26

Individual

- Damallsvenskan Player of the Year: 2025
- Damallsvenskan Golden Boot: 2025
- UEFA Women's Europa Cup top scorer: 2025–26
