= World Open Shogi Championship =

- Sport: Shogi
- Founded: 2000
- Organising body: Federation of European Shogi Associations
- Continent: Europe
- Website: FESA

The World Open Shogi Championship (WOSC) is an international shogi tournament organised annually by the Federation of European Shogi Associations (FESA). It is held together with the European Shogi Championship and is open to players from all countries, including Japanese professionals and amateurs.

== Overview ==
The championship was established in 2013 as an open world-level event separate from the European title competition. Unlike the European Shogi Championship, which is restricted to European players for the title, the World Open Shogi Championship allows participants from any country to compete for the overall title.

FESA promotes shogi through the annual organisation of both the European Shogi Championship and the World Open Shogi Championship, as well as through its international rating system and support for national federations.

The championship has been held in several European countries, including Germany, France, Slovakia, the Netherlands, Spain and Ukraine. Japanese players have frequently dominated the event, although players from Germany and France have also reached the podium.

== History ==
The first World Open Shogi Championship was held in 2000. Since then, the tournament has usually been organised every year alongside the European Shogi Championship. The 2020 edition was not held because of the COVID-19 pandemic.

The event is usually played in Swiss-system format over several rounds. Side events often include blitz tournaments, team competitions and teaching games with professional players from Japan.

The 2022 edition in Ludwigshafen attracted 87 players. Kasey Nishimoto of Japan won the tournament with a perfect score of 9/9.

== Results ==
| Year | Location | 1st Place | 2nd Place | 3rd Place | Players |
|---|---|---|---|---|---|
| 2000 | (United Kingdom) London | (Japan) Ayumu Sato | (Thailand) Chiaki Ito | (United Kingdom) Tony Hosking | 82 |
| 2001 | (United Kingdom) London | (Japan) Yutaka Ishii | (United States) Larry Kaufman | (Austria) Thomas Pfaffel | 36 |
| 2002 | (Belgium) Brussels | (Germany) Boris Mirnik | (Austria) Gert Schnider | (Germany) Jochen Drechsler | 55 |
| 2003 | (Sweden) Öckerö | (Japan) Yoshiyuki Uemura | (Germany) Boris Mirnik | (Austria) Gert Schnider | 48 |
| 2004 | (Germany) Pullach | (Japan) Tsukasa Sera | (Japan) Yuji Kikuta | (Japan) Hideki Tashiro | 53 |
| 2005 | (Czech Republic) Pardubice | (Japan) Tsukasa Sera | (Japan) Yuji Kikuta | (Japan) Hideki Tashiro | 64 |
| 2006 | (France) Colmar | (Japan) Yuji Kikuta | (Hong Kong) Wan Leung Kai | (Japan) Kimio Takahashi | 61 |
| 2007 | (Czech Republic) Pardubice | (Germany) Boris Mirnik | (Germany) Tobias Marczewski | (Japan) Kimio Takahashi | 35 |
| 2008 | (Czech Republic) Pardubice | (Ukraine) Artem Kolomiyets | (Germany) Karl Wartlick | (Netherlands) Marc Theeuwen | 39 |
| 2009 | (Sweden) Stockholm | (Germany) Karl Wartlick | (Japan) Kimio Takahashi | (Japan) Yuji Kikuta | 32 |
| 2010 | (Hungary) Debrecen | (Japan) Kimio Takahashi | (France) Jean Fortin | (Germany) Frank Roevekamp | 39 |
| 2011 | (Germany) Ludwigshafen | (Japan) Makoto Kawato | (Japan) Kimio Takahashi | (Japan) Yasuhiko Utsunomiya | 82 |
| 2012 | (Poland) Kraków | (Japan) Yasuhiko Utsunomiya | (Japan) Kimio Takahashi | (Japan) Makoto Kawato | 87 |
| 2013 | (Belarus) Minsk | (Japan) Takumi Ito | (Belarus) Sergey Korchitsky | (Ukraine) Artem Kolomiyets | 92 |
| 2014 | (Hungary) Budapest | (Poland) Karolina Styczynska | (Japan) Makoto Kawato | (Germany) Thomas Leiter | 78 |
| 2015 | (Czech Republic) Prague | (Japan) Hideaki Takahashi | (Japan) Makoto Kawato | (France) Jean Fortin | 119 |
| 2016 | (Netherlands) Amsterdam | (Japan) Hideaki Takahashi | (Japan) Shou Otsuka | (Japan) Kazuki Itoh | 121 |
| 2017 | (Ukraine) Kyiv | (Japan) Shun Tokuni | (Belarus) Sergey Korchitsky | (Germany) Thomas Leiter | 66 |
| 2018 | (Germany) Berlin | (Japan) Hideaki Takahashi | (Germany) Thomas Leiter | (Belarus) Vincent Tanyan | 128 |
| 2019 | (Slovakia) Bratislava | (Japan) Hideaki Takahashi | (Belarus) Anton Starykevich | (Germany) Thomas Leiter | 104 |
| 2021 | (Belarus) Minsk | (Belarus) Sergey Korchitsky | (Belarus) Anton Starykevich | (Belarus) Vincent Tanyan | 67 |
| 2022 | (Germany) Ludwigshafen | (Japan) Kasey Nishimoto | (Belarus) Uladzislau Zakrzheuski | (France) Jean Fortin | 87 |
| 2023 | (France) Strasbourg | (Belarus) Anton Starykevich | (Germany) Thomas Leiter | (Japan) Kasey Nishimoto | 136 |
| 2024 | (Spain) Barcelona | (Japan) Taichi Kobayashi | (Japan) Kasey Nishimoto | (Japan) Kazushi Shibutani | 107 |
| 2025 | (Poland) Wrocław | (Belarus) Anton Starykevich | (Japan) Kasey Nishimoto | (Singapore) Zhuo Loon Lim | |

== See also ==
- European Shogi Championship
- Federation of European Shogi Associations
- Shogi
