= European Shogi Championship =

- Sport: Shogi
- Founded: 1985
- Organising body: Federation of European Shogi Associations
- Continent: Europe
- Website: https://fesashogi.eu/

The European Shogi Championship (ESC) is an annual international shogi tournament organised by the Federation of European Shogi Associations (FESA), held to determine the continental champion among European players. The championship has been staged since 1985 and typically takes place alongside the World Open Shogi Championship (WOSC), a broader open competition that allows participants from any country to compete.

== Overview ==
The ESC is restricted to European players eligible for the continental title, although tournaments held in parallel (such as the World Open Shogi Championship) allow international participation. The event is usually contested in a Swiss‑system format over several rounds, with additional side events often including blitz tournaments and team competitions.

The European Shogi Championship plays a central role in the promotion and competitive development of shogi across Europe. It is supported and recognised by FESA, which comprises national shogi associations from countries including Austria, Belgium, Belarus, Czech Republic, France, Germany, Netherlands, Poland, Slovakia, Spain, Sweden, Ukraine, and others.

== History ==
The first official European Shogi Championship took place in 1985, shortly after the establishment of FESA. Since then, the championship has been held annually, with exceptions during periods of global disruption (for example, some events around 2020 were affected by the COVID-19 pandemic).

Traditionally the ESC has run alongside the World Open Shogi Championship at the same venue, allowing both the continental title and open world‑level competition to be decided within the same event. The European tournament follows eligibility rules that focus on European players for the title, although the broader open event welcomes players from outside Europe.

Over the years, winners have included prominent European players from across the continent. The tournament has been hosted in a variety of European cities, reflecting the international character of the European shogi community.

== Format ==
The championship is typically contested using the Swiss pairing system, with a fixed number of rounds depending on the number of participants. Players accumulate points across all rounds, and the competitor with the highest score is crowned European Champion. Tie‑break systems are often used to rank players with equal scores. Supplementary events such as blitz championships or team competitions may be organised alongside the main event.

To be eligible for the European Shogi Championship title, players must represent a European country that is a member of FESA. Non‑European participants may still compete in associated open tournaments, but are not eligible for the European title itself. National associations under FESA include member federations from at least 21 European nations across the continent.

== Results ==
| Year | Location | 1st Place | 2nd Place | 3rd Place | Players |
|---|---|---|---|---|---|
| 1985 | (Netherlands) The Hague | (Belgium) Hans Secelle | (United Kingdom) Mike Sandeman | (Japan) Katsura Yamamoto | 24 |
| 1986 | (Belgium) Merelbeke | (Netherlands) Reijer Grimbergen | (Netherlands) Rene Aaij | (United Kingdom) Mike Sandeman | 40 |
| 1987 | (Netherlands) Utrecht | (United Kingdom) Mike Sandeman | (Netherlands) Reijer Grimbergen | (Netherlands) Jan Oosterwijk | 30 |
| 1988 | (Belgium) Ghent | (United Kingdom) Stephen Lamb | (United Kingdom) Mike Sandeman | | 40 |
| 1989 | (United Kingdom) Hythe | (Netherlands) Arend van Oosten | (United Kingdom) Stephen Lamb | (Japan) Y. Mitsui | 41 |
| 1990 | (Germany) Frankfurt | (United Kingdom) David Murphy | (Netherlands) Pieter Stouten | (Japan) Katsura Yamamoto | 60 |
| 1991 | (United Kingdom) Ramsgate | (United Kingdom) Stephen Lamb | (Netherlands) Arend van Oosten | (United Kingdom) Mike Sandeman | 34 |
| 1992 | (United Kingdom) London | (Netherlands) Reijer Grimbergen | (France) Eric Cheymol | (United Kingdom) Michael Trent | 32 |
| 1993 | (Netherlands) The Hague | (Netherlands) Arend van Oosten | (United Kingdom) Tony Hosking | (Netherlands) Reijer Grimbergen | 32 |
| 1994 | (Belgium) Brussels | (Japan) Shuji Takahara | (Belgium) Hans Segers | (France) Eric Cheymol | 41 |
| 1995 | (Belgium) Brussels | (Netherlands) Reijer Grimbergen | (United Kingdom) Les Blackstock | (Netherlands) Arend van Oosten | 52 |
| 1996 | (Belgium) Brussels | (Netherlands) Arend van Oosten | (Japan) Toyokazu Miyamoto | (Japan) Tsutomu Fukumura | 62 |
| 1997 | (Belgium) Brussels | (Japan) Toyokazu Miyamoto | (Japan) Susumu Hara | (France) Eric Cheymol | 63 |
| 1998 | (Netherlands) Leiden | (Germany) Boris Mirnik | (Netherlands) Reijer Grimbergen | (Belgium) Matt Casters | 48 |
| 1999 | (Netherlands) Leiden | (Netherlands) Arend van Oosten | (United Kingdom) Stephen Lamb | (United Kingdom) Tony Hosking | 47 |
| 2000 | (United Kingdom) London | (United Kingdom) Tony Hosking | (Japan) Kei Ichiyanagi | (Netherlands) Arend van Oosten | 82 |
| 2001 | (United Kingdom) London | (France) Frederic Pottier | (Austria) Gert Schnider | (United Kingdom) Richard Sams | 36 |
| 2002 | (Belgium) Brussels | (Germany) Boris Mirnik | (France) Eric Cheymol | (Austria) Gert Schnider | 55 |
| 2003 | (Sweden) Öckerö | (Japan) Yoshiyuki Uemura | (Sweden) Thore Angqvist | (Germany) Boris Mirnik | 48 |
| 2004 | (Germany) Pullach | (Japan) Yuji Kikuta | (Japan) Hideki Tashiro | (Japan) Yoshiyuki Uemura | 53 |
| 2005 | (Czech Republic) Pardubice | (Ukraine) Artem Kolomiyets | (Netherlands) Arend van Oosten | (Germany) Boris Mirnik | 64 |
| 2006 | (France) Colmar | (Netherlands) Arend van Oosten | (Germany) Frank Roevekamp | (Germany) Jochen Drechsler | 61 |
| 2007 | (Czech Republic) Pardubice | (Russia) Victor Zapara | (Germany) Boris Mirnik | (Netherlands) Marc Theeuwen | 35 |
| 2008 | (Czech Republic) Pardubice | (Ukraine) Artem Kolomiyets | (Germany) Karl Wartlick | (Netherlands) Marc Theeuwen | 39 |
| 2009 | (Sweden) Stockholm | (France) Jean Fortin | (Germany) Karl Wartlick | (Sweden) Christer Hartman | 32 |
| 2010 | (Hungary) Debrecen | (France) Jean Fortin | (Hungary) Gergely Buglyo | (Germany) Thomas Leiter | 39 |
| 2011 | (Germany) Ludwigshafen | (France) Jean Fortin | (Germany) Boris Mirnik | (Germany) Thomas Leiter | 82 |
| 2012 | (Poland) Kraków | (Germany) Thomas Leiter | (Belarus) Sergey Korchitsky | (Hungary) Laszlo Abuczki | 87 |
| 2013 | (Belarus) Minsk | (Belarus) Sergey Korchitsky | (Russia) Victor Zapara | (Ukraine) Artem Kolomiyets | 92 |
| 2014 | (Hungary) Budapest | (Poland) Karolina Styczynska | (Austria) Marco Dietmayer | (France) Jean Fortin | 78 |
| 2015 | (Czech Republic) Prague | (France) Jean Fortin | (Ukraine) Sergei Krivoshey | (Hungary) Laszlo Abuczki | 119 |
| 2016 | (Netherlands) Amsterdam | (France) Jean Fortin | (Belarus) Vincent Tanyan | (Germany) Karl Wartlick | 121 |
| 2017 | (Ukraine) Kyiv | (Belarus) Vincent Tanyan | (Belarus) Sergey Korchitsky | (Germany) Thomas Leiter | 66 |
| 2018 | (Germany) Berlin | (Germany) Thomas Leiter | (France) Jean Fortin | (Belarus) Vincent Tanyan | 128 |
| 2019 | (Slovakia) Bratislava | (Belarus) Vincent Tanyan | (Germany) Thomas Leiter | (Belarus) Anton Starykevich | 109 |
| 2021 | (Belarus) Minsk | (Belarus) Sergey Korchitsky | (Belarus) Vincent Tanyan | (Belarus) Anton Starykevich | 67 |
| 2022 | (Germany) Ludwigshafen | (Belarus) Uladzislau Zakrzheuski | (France) Jean Fortin | (Belarus) Anton Starykevich | 87 |
| 2023 | (France) Strasbourg | (Belarus) Anton Starykevich | (Germany) Thomas Leiter | (Belarus) Maxim Shaporov | 136 |
| 2024 | (Spain) Barcelona | (France) Jean Fortin | (Germany) Frank Rövekamp | (Greece) Stefanos Mandalas | 87 |
| 2025 | (Poland) Wrocław | (Belarus) Anton Starykevich | (Belarus) Uladzislau Zakrzheuski | (France) Jean Fortin | 87 |

== See also ==
- World Open Shogi Championship
- Federation of European Shogi Associations
- Shogi
