= Sjumansholmen =

Island in Gothenburg Municipality, Sweden

Coordinates: 57.59289°N 11.76535°E

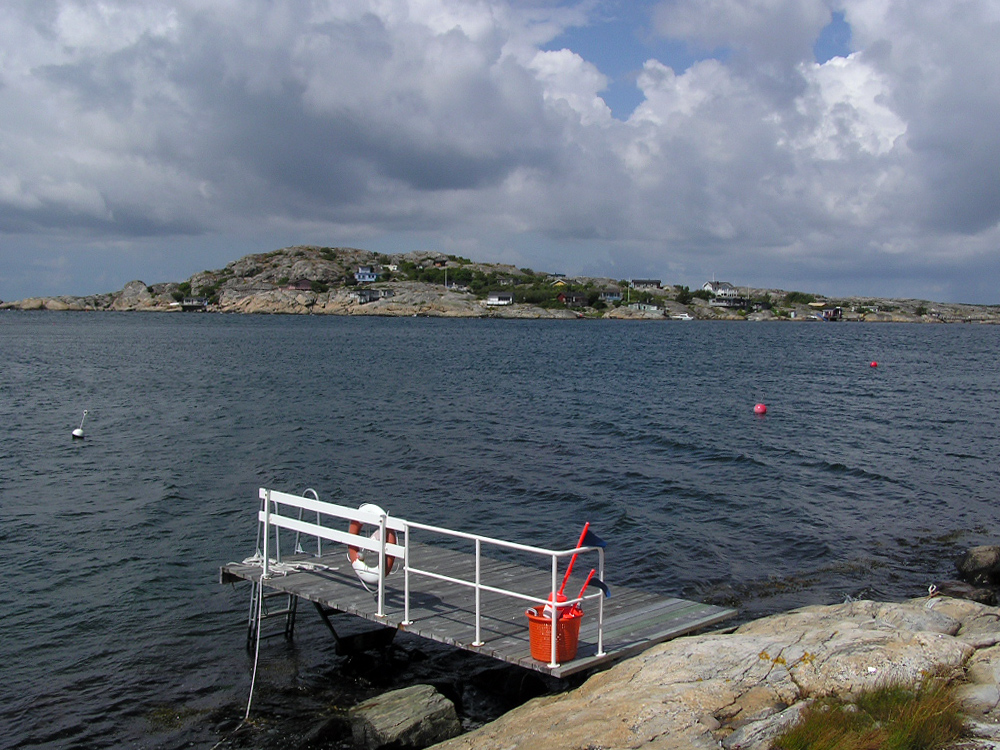
Sjumansholmen

Sjumansholmen is the smallest island of the Southern Gothenburg Archipelago serviced by public ferry transport.
