= Lilla Varholmen =

Island in Sweden

Coordinates: 57°42′23″N 11°42′16″E

Lilla Varholmen is an island in Gothenburg's northern archipelago. The island is attached to Hisingen via a bridge and a car ferry service to Öckerö and Björkö is operated from here. The first lighthouse was established in 1889. The current lighthouse is from 1927. Lilla Varholmen is a small island located in the Gothenburg archipelago, in Västra Götaland County, Sweden. It lies just off the coast near Hisingen and marks the transition between the Göta älv river and the Kattegat sea. The island plays a strategic role in regional transportation and maritime navigation.

Lilla Varholmen is best known for its lighthouse, which has served as a vital beacon for vessels navigating the coastal waters. The original lighthouse was built in 1889 and has since been replaced by a modern light. The island is connected to Hisingen by a short bridge and serves as the ferry terminal for routes to the northern archipelago, including the islands of Hönö, Öckerö, and Björkö.

Today, Lilla Varholmen is primarily a transit point, but it also offers scenic views and is a popular spot for recreational boating and fishing.

References

1. Sjofartsverket. "Svenska fyrar – Lilla Varholmen." https://www.sjofartsverket.se
2. Västtrafik. “Ferry Services from Lilla Varholmen.” https://www.vasttrafik.se
