= Donsö IS =

Swedish football club

- Full name: Donsö Idrottssällskap
- Nickname: DIS
- Ground: Donsövallen; Donsö; Sweden
- Chairman: Kurt Ingemar Andersson
- League: Division 4 Göteborg B
Home colours	Away colours

Donsö IS is a Swedish football club located in Donsö.

== Background ==
Donsö IS currently plays in Division 4 Göteborg B which is the sixth tier of Swedish football. They play their home matches at the Donsövallen in Donsö.

The club is affiliated to Göteborgs Fotbollförbund. Donsö IS have competed in the Svenska Cupen on 1 occasion and have played 3 matches in the competition.

== Season to season ==
Season	Level	Division	Section	Position	Movements
1999	Tier 6	Division 5	Göteborg B	1st	Promoted
2000	Tier 5	Division 4	Göteborg B	10th	
2001	Tier 5	Division 4	Göteborg B	11th	Relegated
2002	Tier 6	Division 5	Göteborg B	3rd	
2003	Tier 6	Division 5	Göteborg B	4th	
2004	Tier 6	Division 5	Göteborg B	1st	
2005	Tier 6	Division 5	Göteborg B	3rd	Promoted
2006*	Tier 6	Division 4	Göteborg B	10th	
2007	Tier 6	Division 4	Göteborg B	11th	Relegated
2008	Tier 7	Division 5	Göteborg B	5th	
2009	Tier 7	Division 5	Göteborg B	6th	
2010	Tier 7	Division 5	Göteborg B	1st	Promoted
2011	Tier 6	Division 4	Göteborg B	10th	

* League restructuring in 2006 resulted in a new division being created at Tier 3 and subsequent divisions dropping a level.
