= Öckerö IF =

Swedish football club

- Full name: Öckerö Idrottsförening
- Ground: Prästängen; Öckerö; Sweden
- Chairman: David Fränne
- League: Division 2 Göteborg B
Home colours	Away colours

Öckerö IF is a Swedish football club located in Öckerö.

== Background ==
Öckerö IF currently plays in Division 3 Göteborg B which is the sixth tier of Swedish football. They play their home matches at the Prästängen in Öckerö.

The club is affiliated to Göteborgs Fotbollförbund. Öckerö IF have competed in the Svenska Cupen on 12 occasions and have played 22 matches in the competition.

== Season to season ==
In their most successful period Öckerö IF competed in the following divisions:

Season	Level	Division	Section	Position	Movements
1974	Tier 4	Division 4	Göteborg B	1st	Promoted
1975	Tier 3	Division 3	Nordvästra Götaland	11th	Relegated
1976	Tier 4	Division 4	Göteborg B	1st	Promoted
1977	Tier 3	Division 3	Nordvästra Götaland	8th	
1978	Tier 3	Division 3	Nordvästra Götaland	12th	Relegated
1979	Tier 4	Division 4	Göteborg B	7th	
1980	Tier 4	Division 4	Göteborg B	9th	
1981	Tier 4	Division 4	Göteborg B	1st	Promoted
1982	Tier 3	Division 3	Nordvästra Götaland	12th	Relegated
1983	Tier 4	Division 4	Göteborg B	7th	

In recent seasons Öckerö IF have competed in the following divisions:

Season	Level	Division	Section	Position	Movements
1999	Tier 7	Division 6	Göteborg D	1st	Promoted
2000	Tier 6	Division 5	Göteborg A	2nd	Promoted
2001	Tier 5	Division 4	Göteborg A	3rd	
2002	Tier 5	Division 4	Göteborg A	6th	
2003	Tier 5	Division 4	Göteborg A	2nd	Promotion Playoffs
2004	Tier 5	Division 4	Göteborg A	2nd	Promotion Playoffs – Promoted
2005	Tier 4	Division 3	Mellersta Götaland	10th	Relegated
2006*	Tier 6	Division 4	Göteborg B	6th	
2007	Tier 6	Division 4	Göteborg B	9th	
2008	Tier 6	Division 4	Göteborg B	6th	
2009	Tier 6	Division 4	Göteborg B	7th	
2010	Tier 6	Division 4	Göteborg B	7th	
2011	Tier 6	Division 4	Göteborg B	3rd	

* League restructuring in 2006 resulted in a new division being created at Tier 3 and subsequent divisions dropping a level.
