= Rörö =

- Location within Västra Götaland Location within Sweden
- Coordinates: 57°47′N 11°37′E
- Country: Sweden
- Province: Bohuslän
- County: Västra Götaland County
- Municipality: Öckerö Municipality

Area
  - Total: 0.53 km^{2} (0.20 sq mi)

Population (31 December 2010)
  - Total: 269
  - Density: 510/km^{2} (1,300/sq mi)
- Time zone: UTC+1 (CET)
  - Summer (DST): UTC+2 (CEST)

Rörö is a locality situated in Öckerö Municipality, Västra Götaland County, Sweden with 269 inhabitants in 2010.
