= Pågen =

Swedish bakery company

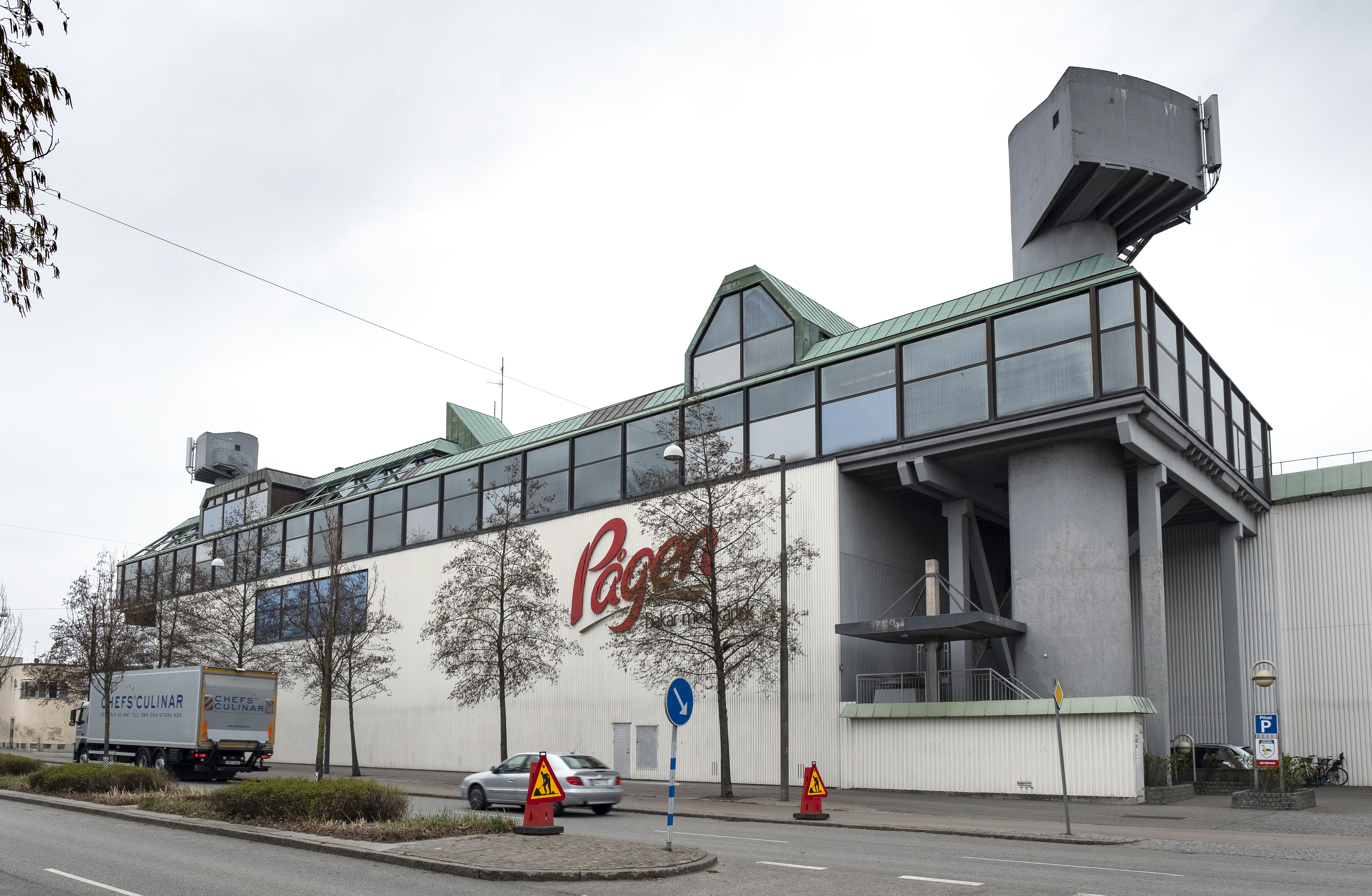
Pågen (2021)

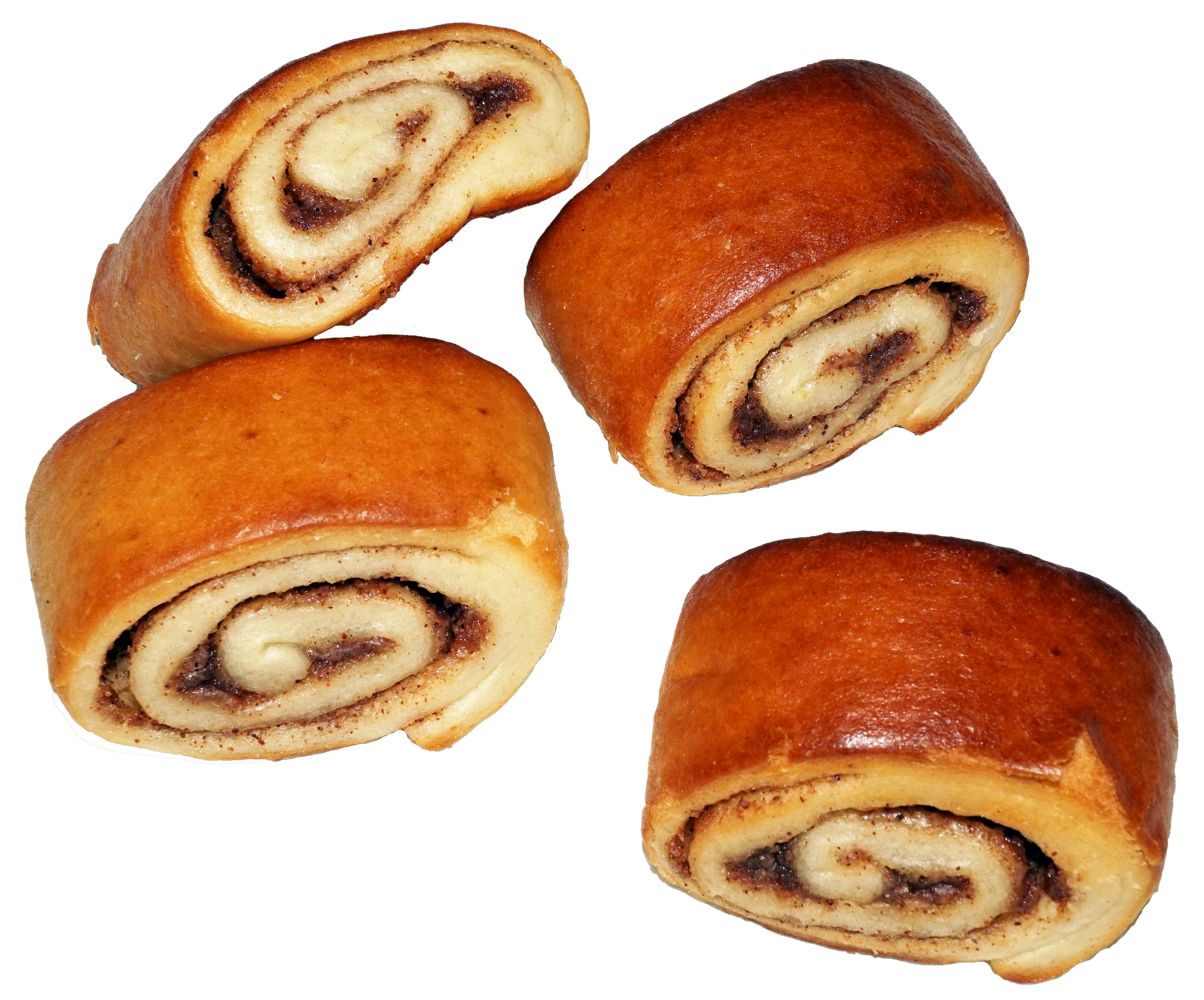
Pågen Gifflar cinnamon rolls

Pågen is a Swedish bakery company founded in 1878 by Anders and Matilda Påhlsson. The company started off as a small bakery in Malmö, in the southern province of Scania. Their bakeries are run by around 1350 employees, and are located in Malmö and Gothenburg. Their products include brands such as Krisprolls and various types of bread, pastries and cookies. With key export markets in France, United Kingdom, Belgium, and Denmark, Pågen is currently one of Sweden's leading food exporters with an annual turnover of around 220 million euros.

== Name ==
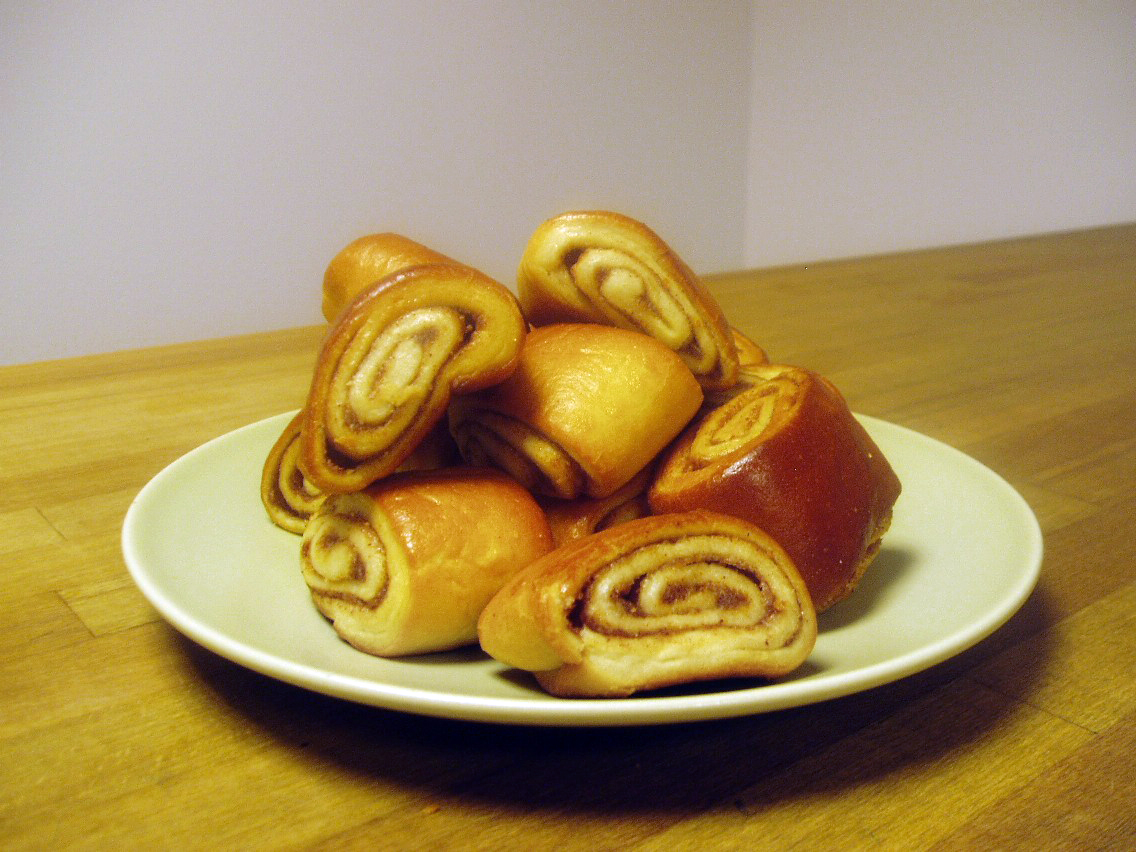
Gifflar cinnamon rolls, as seen on a plate.

Pågen is the definite form of the word påg, meaning boy in the Scanian dialect of Swedish.

== Culture ==
Pågen marketed their 'Tosca Pågar' cookies as 'Florentine Pogens' in the United States until 1992, and Frank Zappa wrote a song called 'Florentine Pogen', with the opening line "She was the daughter of a wealthy Florentine Pogen", which was released on the album One Size Fits All (1975).
