= Styrsö =

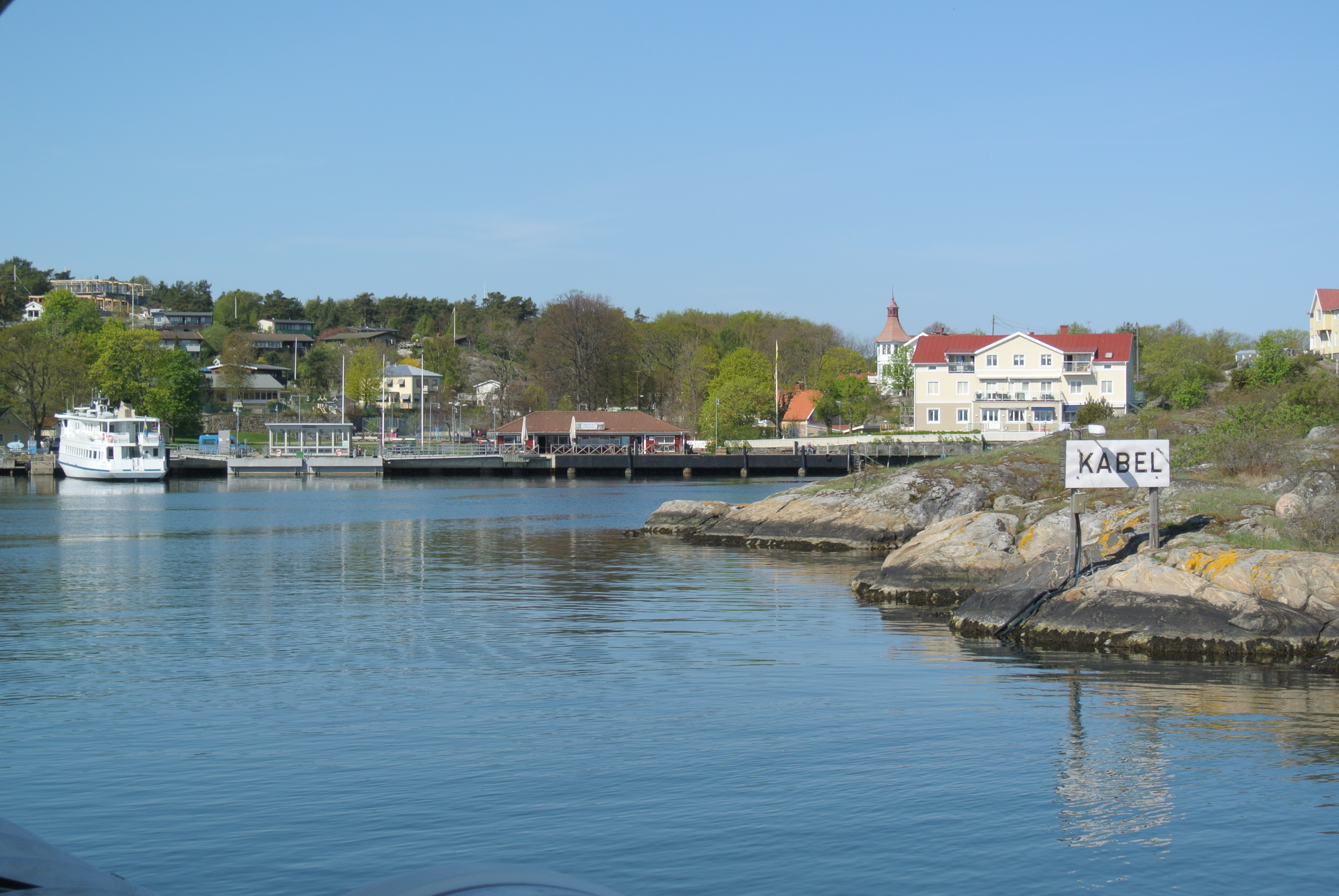
- Styrsö as seen from the sea

- Location within Västra Götaland Location within Sweden
- Coordinates: 57°37′N 11°47′E
- Country: Sweden
- Province: Västergötland
- County: Västra Götaland County
- Municipality: Göteborg Municipality

Area
  - Total: 1.58 km^{2} (0.61 sq mi)

Population (31 December 2010)
  - Total: 1,304
  - Density: 824/km^{2} (2,130/sq mi)
- Time zone: UTC+1 (CET)
  - Summer (DST): UTC+2 (CEST)

Styrsö (Swedish pronunciation: [ˈstʏ̂ʂːœ]) is a small island and a locality situated in Gothenburg Municipality, Västra Götaland County, Sweden. It had 1,304 inhabitants in 2010.

It lies in the Southern Gothenburg Archipelago of Sweden with about 1,400 inhabitants. Regular ferries connect the island to Gothenburg and a bridge links Styrsö with Donsö. The main type of land transport on the island is a three-wheeled moped, called a flakmoped in Swedish. (The locals call it lastmoppe). Regular cars are not allowed on the Island.

On Styrsö there are four small communities with different characters. The oldest is the Village, called "Byn" with the church from 1752, farms and old cultivated land. "Styrsö Tången" (Seaweed) is the traditional fishing village with dense buildings and winding narrow roads. In "Halsvik", the well-ordered seacaptains made their mark on the buildings and "Bratten" got the nice summer guests. Recent years Styrsö Sandvik has become a popular guest harbour for sailors.

== History ==
People were living on the island as far back as the stone-age, who collected fish and shellfish from the rich coastal supply. Remains can be found from the bronze-age, including the Stora Rös on the southern part of the island.

In the 16th century the Swedish king Gustav Vasa supported the establishment of a farming/fishing society on the island, who could deliver fish to people living further up the river Göta Älv. The rich herring periods in the centuries to come brought temporary economic boosts, but otherwise, the circumstances for the islanders were economically challenging.

=== Stora Rös ===
Stora Rös is the archipelago's highest point with its bronze-age cairn. On clear days you can see Bohuslän in the north, Gothenburg in the east, Halland to the south and the silhouette of Vinga against the horizon in the west. At Brännholmsviken lies the Vikingakyrkogården and the bronze-age settlement.

== The Villages ==
=== Bratten ===
In the beginning of the 1800s the Öberg family took over the herring salting factory which was situated by the sea and established an inn – Café Öbergska today. Öbergs House from 1812 can also be seen. In the end of that century a spa company was formed, while wealthy people built fancy summer houses nearby.

The Arbores Society are active today and are responsible for planting trees in the nearby park for recreational purposes and organizing the traditional Midsummer festivities on Bratten. Today there are a pub and a traditional café as well as a guest harbour and a beach 200 meters further to north.

=== Bye (The Village) ===
The earliest village is situated around the present church. Craftsmen gathered here and shops were established. Southwest of the Village (Kyrkbyn) is where the Large Meadow is situated, where the villagers farmed, cultivated crops and kept animals. Lambs continue to graze there today. One of three larger garden centres was established here in the 18th century. There is a local History Museum near the church with a vast collection of old fishing equipment.

=== Halsvik ===
Southwest of the island, the freight skippers built their somewhat fancier villas, which are easy to recognize even today. On the road down to the harbour lies the oldest house on Styrsö: a red painted front chamber cottage on the left side.

=== Tången ===
Years ago, Tången was a separate part of the island, where the houses were built very close to each other, like in many other fishing communities in Bohuslän. The fishing trawlers which crowded the old port moved to the new port of Sandvik in 1960, where traditional fishing methods continue to operate. The guest harbour in Sandvik is well equipped with a new petrol station and is well protected from heavy sea.

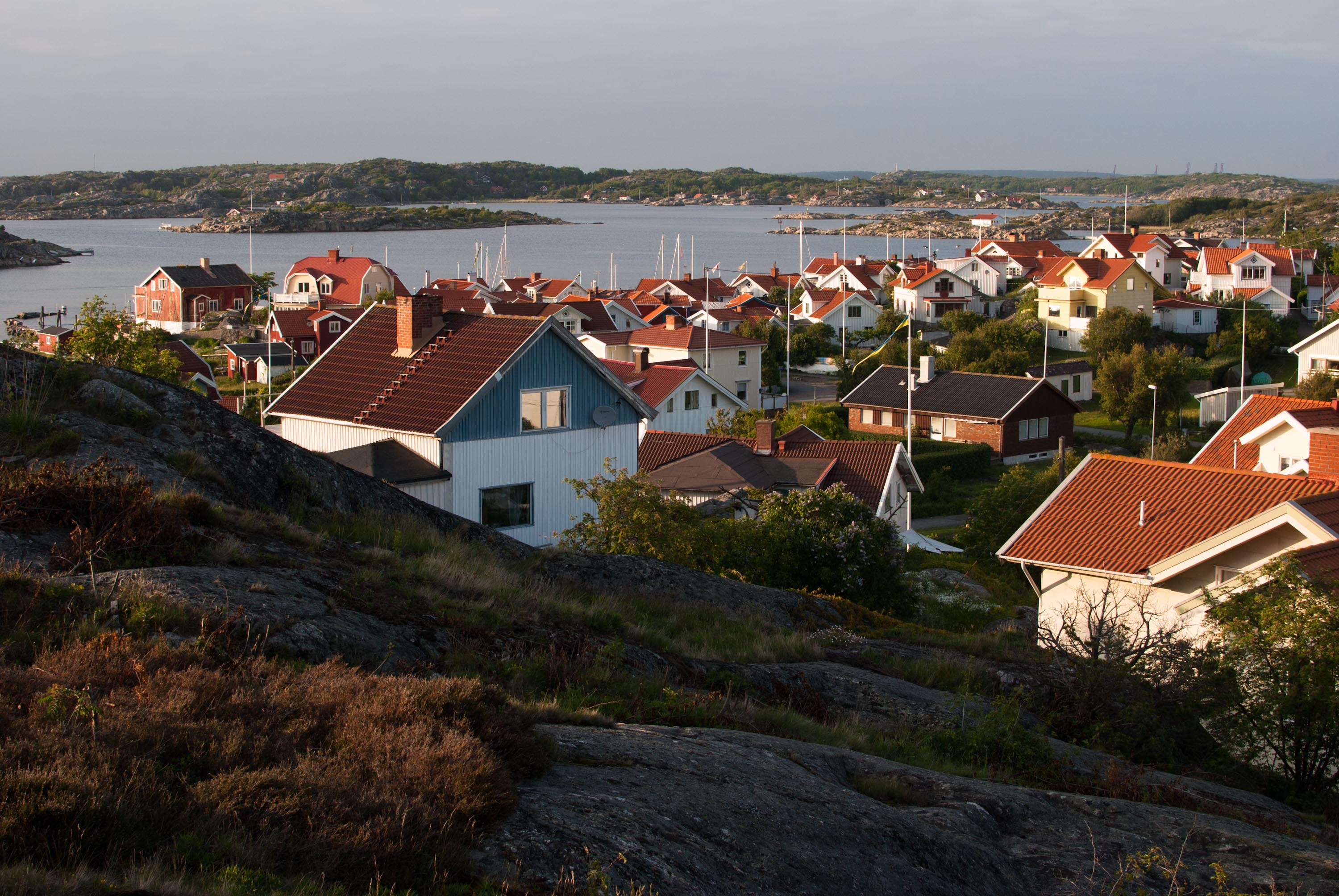
Styrsö

== Famous People from Styrsö ==
Director Ruben Östlund was born on Styrsö in 1974 and grew up on the Island.
