= Hälsö =

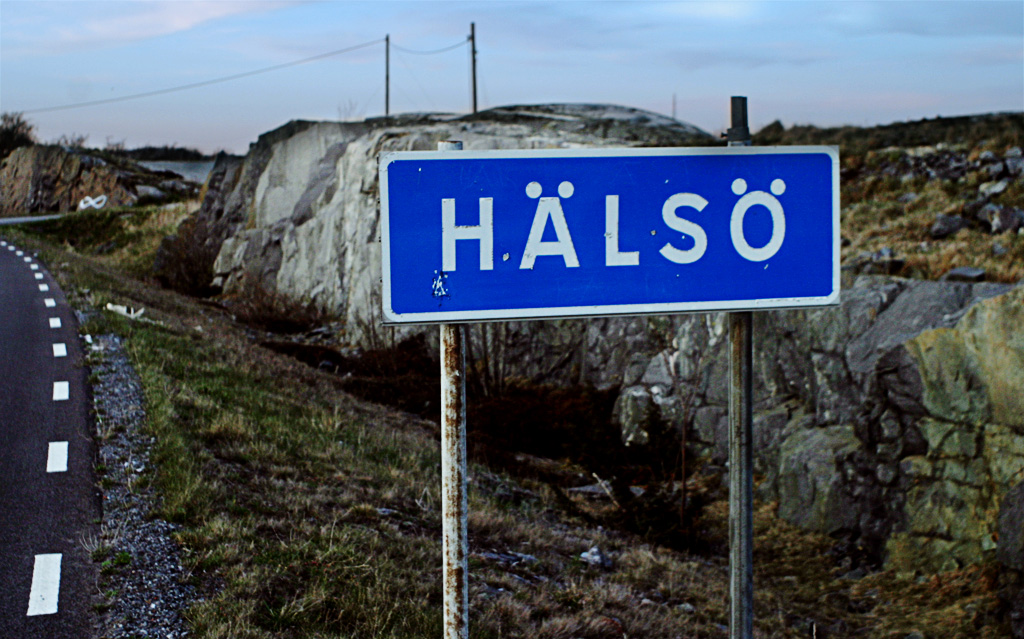

- Location within Västra Götaland Location within Sweden
- Coordinates: 57°44′N 11°39′E
- Country: Sweden
- Province: Bohuslän
- County: Västra Götaland County
- Municipality: Öckerö Municipality

Area
  - Total: 0.51 km^{2} (0.20 sq mi)

Population (31 December 2010)
  - Total: 611
  - Density: 1,190/km^{2} (3,100/sq mi)
- Time zone: UTC+1 (CET)
  - Summer (DST): UTC+2 (CEST)

Hälsö (Swedish pronunciation: [ˈhɛ̂lːsœ]) is an island and a locality situated in Öckerö Municipality, Västra Götaland County, Sweden with 611 inhabitants in 2010. Hälsö is situated in the northern part of the archipelago and offers nice harbour walks along small and winding roads. There are also ancient remains on the island, mainly stone circles from temporary fishing camps. On the northern part of the island there are good fishing opportunities. Tjolmen beach on the southern part of the island is the most popular for swimming.
