= Öckerö Municipality =

Öckerö Municipality Öckerö kommun
- Municipality
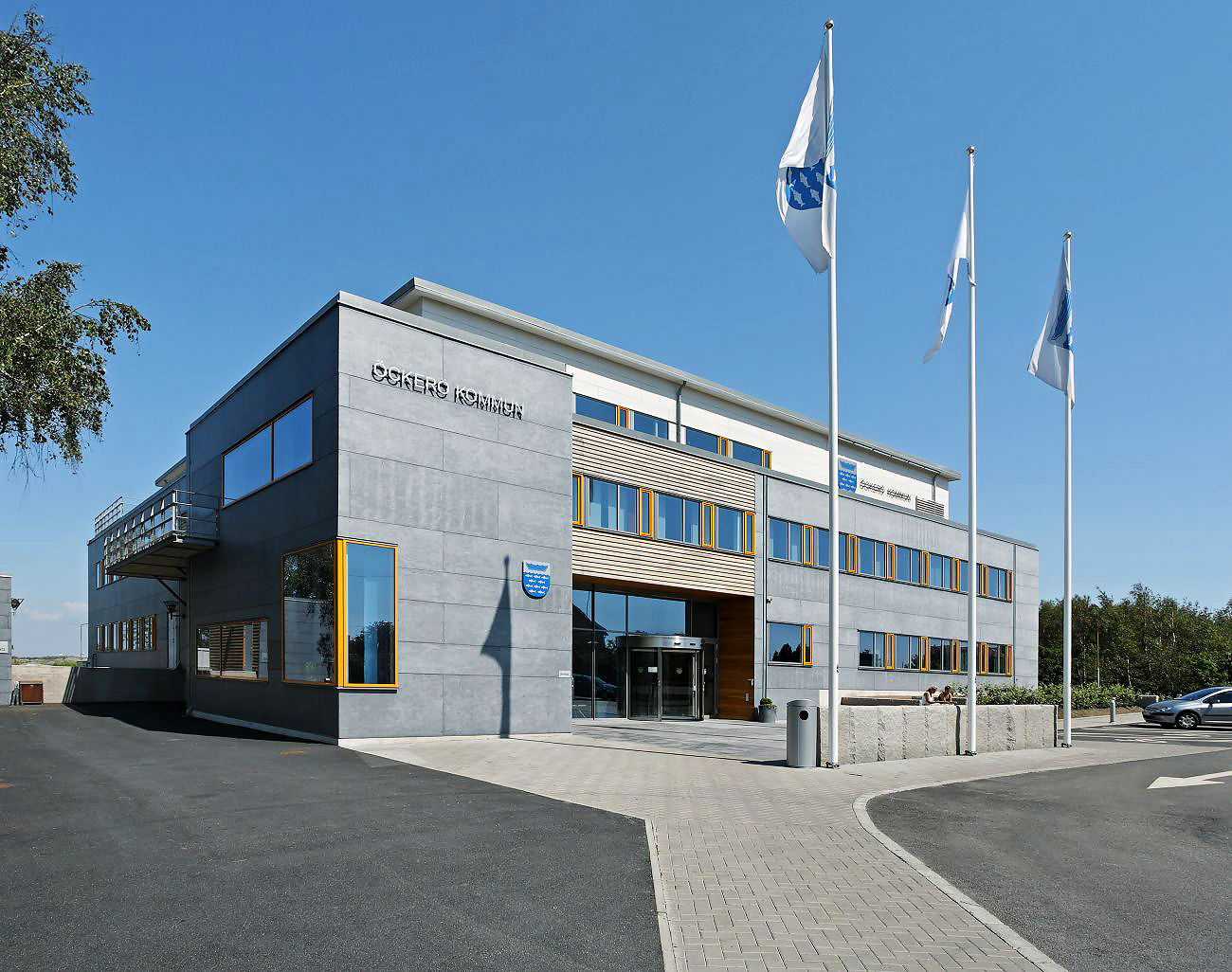
- Öckerö town hall

- Coat of arms

- Coordinates: 57°42′N 11°39′E
- Country: Sweden
- County: Västra Götaland County
- Seat: Öckerö

Area
  - Total: 511.4 km^{2} (197.5 sq mi)
  - Land: 25.74 km^{2} (9.94 sq mi)
  - Water: 485.66 km^{2} (187.51 sq mi)
- Area as of 1 January 2014.

Population (30 June 2025)
  - Total: 12,791
  - Density: 496.9/km^{2} (1,287/sq mi)
- Time zone: UTC+1 (CET)
  - Summer (DST): UTC+2 (CEST)
- ISO 3166 code: SE
- Province: Bohuslän
- Municipal code: 1407
- Website: www.ockero.se

Öckerö Municipality (Swedish: Öckerö kommun, pronounced [ˈœkːɛrø kɔˈmʉːn]) is a municipality in Västra Götaland County in western Sweden. Its seat is located in the town of Öckerö on the main island, which is also called Öckerö.

The municipality consists of islands in the Northern Gothenburg Archipelago just outside Gothenburg. With a total area of 26.03 km^{2} it is one of the smallest municipalities of Sweden.

The municipality is one of very few in Sweden which has not been amalgamated and thus still has the same area as the unit formed out of a parish (socken) by the first local government acts of 1862. In the period 1915–1959 there were a number of municipalsamhällen (a sort of boroughs within a rural municipality handling matters of urban character) in the municipality.

== Geography ==
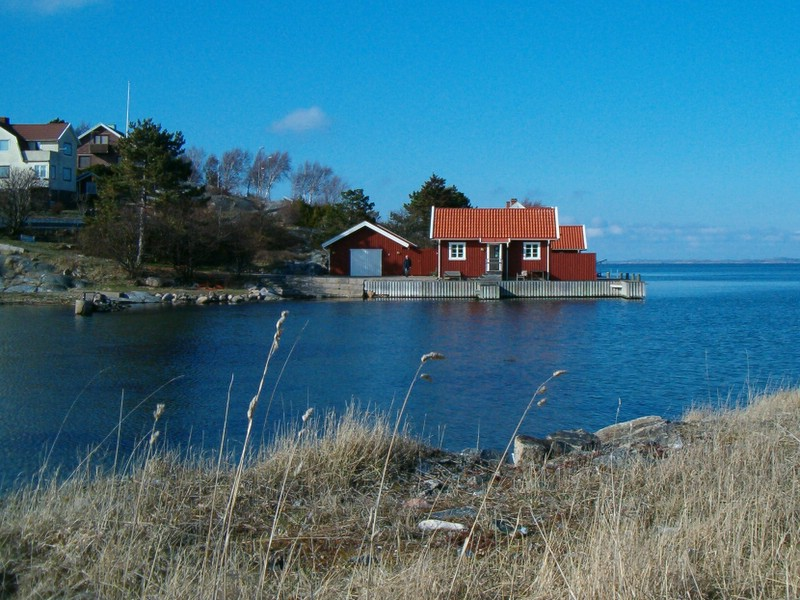
Hälsö island

The municipality consists of ten year-round inhabited islands. They are considered to stretch from the Vinga Lighthouse up to the coastal town of Marstrand in the municipality of Kungälv. The ten islands are named:

1. Björkö
2. Fotö
3. Grötö
4. Hyppeln
5. Hälsö
6. Hönö
7. Kalvsund
8. Källö-Knippla
9. Rörö
10. Öckerö

N.B. that "ö" means "island" in Swedish, hence there are many names ending with "ö". E.g. Björkö means "Birch Island".

Of these, Hönö is the largest with some 4,800 inhabitants, and Öckerö is also fairly large with 3,100. However, all ten are inhabited by people all year around. Most islands have bridge connection between each other. However, there is no road connection to the mainland, just car ferries from western Gothenburg. The ferry connections are good with a dense schedule. A local referendum in 2003 in Öckerö Municipality rejected the plans for a future bridge to the mainland.

== Demographics ==
This is a demographic table based on Öckerö Municipality's electoral districts in the 2022 Swedish general election sourced from SVT's election platform, in turn taken from SCB official statistics.

In total there were 12,895 residents, including 10,173 Swedish citizens of voting age. 38.3% voted for the left coalition and 60.6% for the right coalition.

Location	Residents	Citizen adults	Left vote	Right vote	Employed	Swedish parents	Foreign heritage	Income SEK	Degree
Location			%	%					
Bohus-Björkö	1,839	1,465	48.6	51.1	84	92	8	30,594	54
Fotö, Hönö S	2,547	1,962	34.3	64.1	85	92	8	29,314	41
Hyppeln, Hälsö	1,294	1,139	41.2	58.2	86	94	6	28,165	42
Hönö NO	1,666	1,311	40.1	58.8	82	92	8	25,245	31
Hönö NV	1,976	1,518	37.3	61.6	87	92	8	29,231	40
Öckerö N	1,826	1,399	32.0	66.6	85	90	10	29,108	43
Öckerö S	1,747	1,379	36.1	62.2	85	91	9	28,169	44
Source: SVT

== History ==
During the Viking Age the islands of Öckerö belonged to the Norwegian kings, and the part of the coast was known as Älvsyssel. In the 13th century the King Hakon Hakonarson built himself a house on Öckerö, because he was often around there with his navy.

In 1658 or thereabout, the area became Swedish together with Bohuslän.

In the middle of the 18th century, the fishing of herring blossomed into a full scaled industry, and the islands fishing communities flourished for some 50 years.

In the 1950s the coat of arms were designed. As the main industry has always been fishing, a boat and herring became symbols. The ten herrings correspond to the ten islands.

Ömål, also called öbo, is a Swedish Götamål dialect spoken on the islands of the Öckerö municipality. It has some features of the Gothenburg Swedish dialect (Göteborgska), but also features from English.
