= Vejrø =

Island in Denmark

Coordinates: 55°02′N 11°22′E

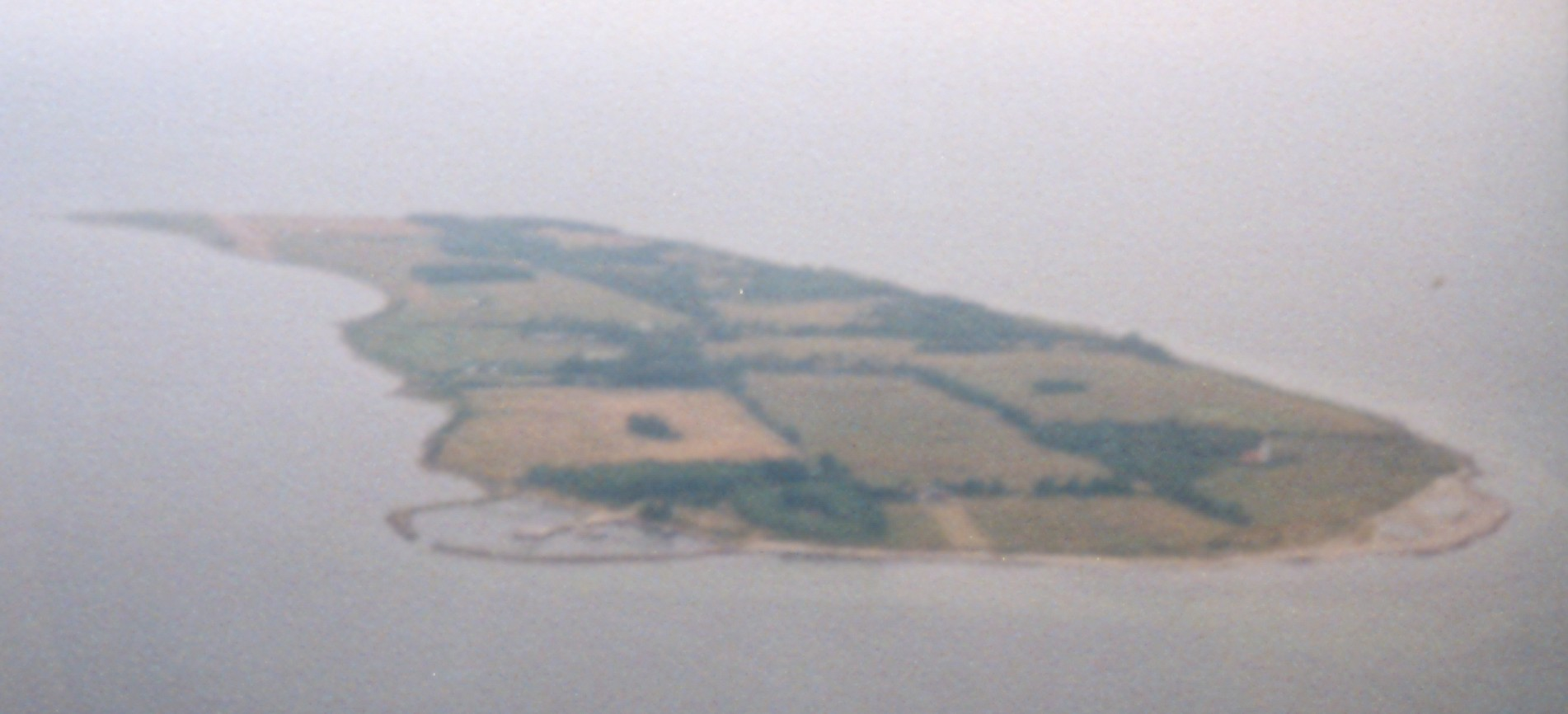
Vejrø

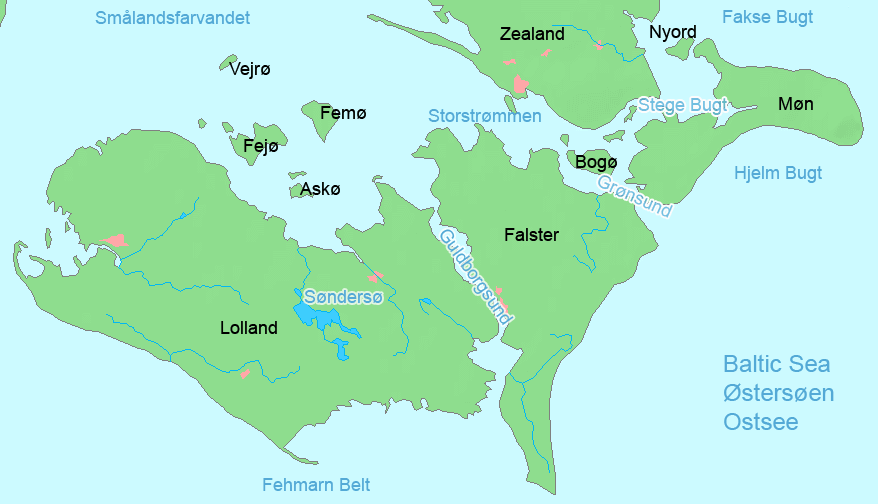
Vejrø north of Lolland.

Vejrø is a Danish island north of Lolland. It covers an area of 1.57 square kilometres (0.61 square miles) and has two inhabitants (as of 2005).

The island is private property; for tourists, it offers a marina, an airfield, and some cottages for rent.
