= Källö-Knippla =

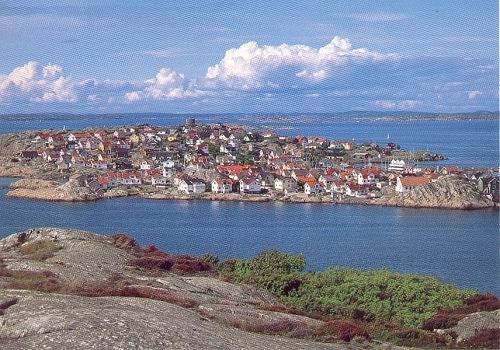

- Location within Västra Götaland Location within Sweden
- Coordinates: 57°45′N 11°39′E
- Country: Sweden
- Province: Bohuslän
- County: Västra Götaland County
- Municipality: Öckerö Municipality

Area
  - Total: 0.29 km^{2} (0.11 sq mi)

Population (31 December 2010)
  - Total: 369
  - Density: 1,276/km^{2} (3,300/sq mi)
- Time zone: UTC+1 (CET)
  - Summer (DST): UTC+2 (CEST)

Källö-Knippla (Swedish pronunciation: [ɕɛløː knɪpˈla]) is an island and a locality in Öckerö Municipality, Västra Götaland County, Sweden with 369 inhabitants in 2010.
