= IFK Björkö =

Swedish football club

- Full name: Idrottsföreningen Kamraterna Björkö
- Founded: 1925
- Ground: Björkövallen; Björkö; Sweden
- Chairman: Bo Stefan Granstav
- League: Division 4 Göteborg B
Home colours

IFK Björkö is a Swedish football club located in Bohus-Björkö.

== Background ==
IFK Björkö currently plays in Division 4 Göteborg B which is the sixth tier of Swedish football. They play their home matches at Björkövallen in Bohus-Björkö.

The club is affiliated to Göteborgs Fotbollförbund.

== Season to season ==
Season	Level	Division	Section	Position	Movements
2006*	Tier 8	Division 6	Göteborg C	2nd	Promotion Playoffs – Promoted
2007	Tier 7	Division 5	Göteborg A	1st	Promoted
2008	Tier 6	Division 4	Göteborg B	8th	
2009	Tier 6	Division 4	Göteborg B	6th	
2010	Tier 6	Division 4	Göteborg B	10th	
2011	Tier 6	Division 4	Göteborg B		

* League restructuring in 2006 resulted in a new division being created at Tier 3 and subsequent divisions dropping a level.
