= Vargö =

Nature reserve in Västra Götaland, Sweden

Coordinates: 57°37′N 11°4′E

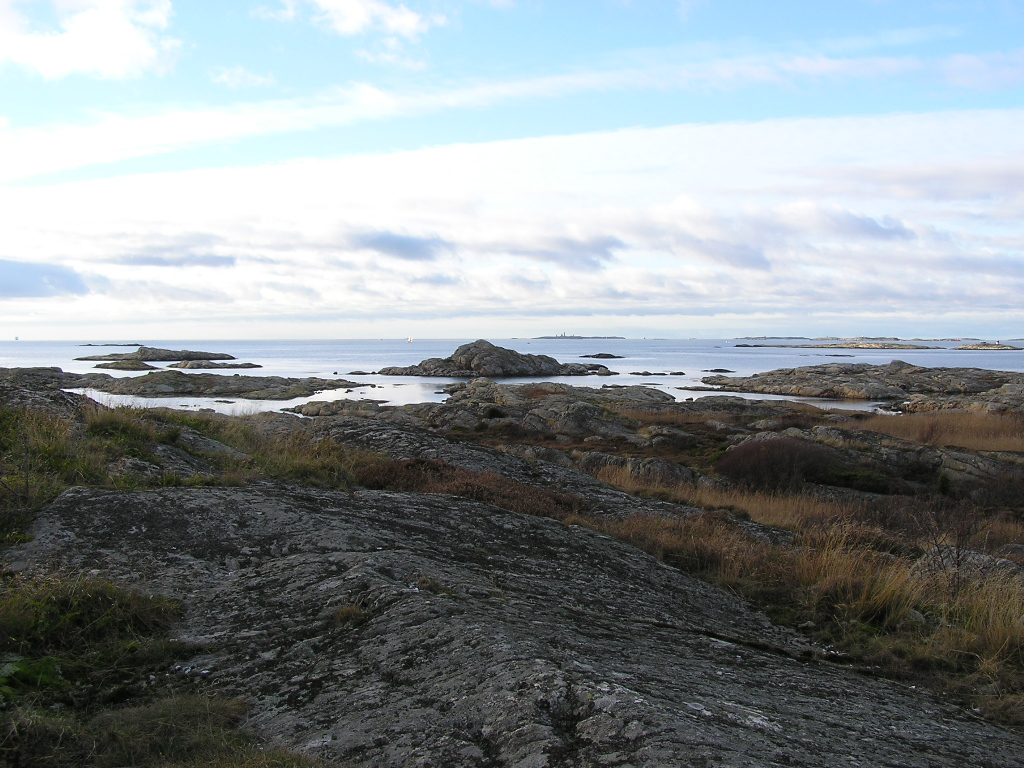
Vargö. View towards SW.

Vargö is a small island, one of the westmost in the Southern Göteborg Archipelago of Sweden. Facing the open sea, it is an almost completely barren island, and a nature reserve.

Bälviken with its beautiful sandy beach constitutes the best location for swimming.
