= Kalvsund =

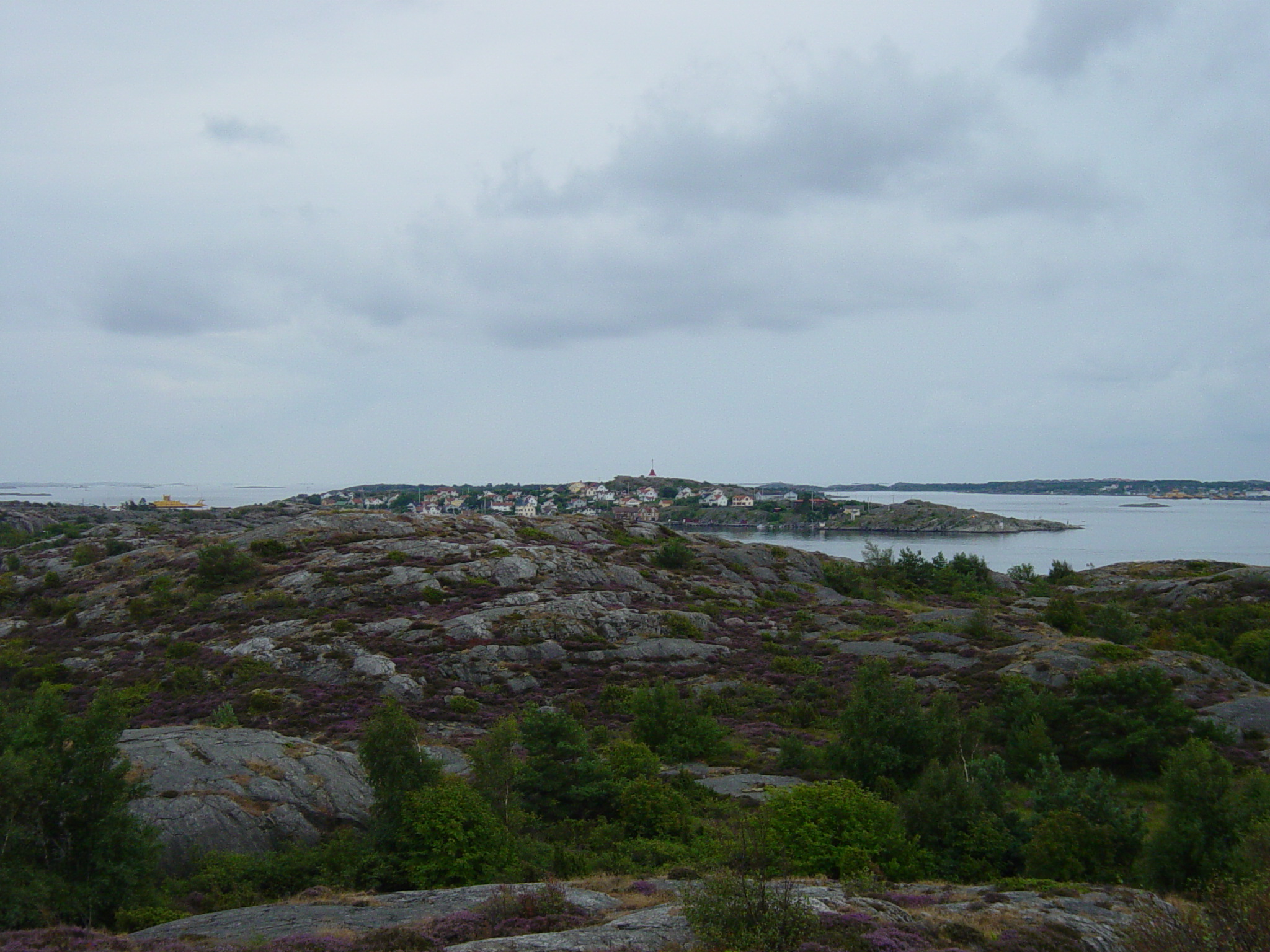

- Location within Västra Götaland Location within Sweden
- Coordinates: 57°42′30″N 11°40′50″E
- Country: Sweden
- Province: Bohuslän
- County: Västra Götaland County
- Municipality: Öckerö Municipality

Area
  - Total: 0.18 km^{2} (0.069 sq mi)

Population (31 December 2010)
  - Total: 221
  - Density: 1,202/km^{2} (3,110/sq mi)
- Time zone: UTC+1 (CET)
  - Summer (DST): UTC+2 (CEST)

Kalvsund is a locality situated in Öckerö Municipality, Västra Götaland County, Sweden with 221 inhabitants in 2010.
