= Fotö =

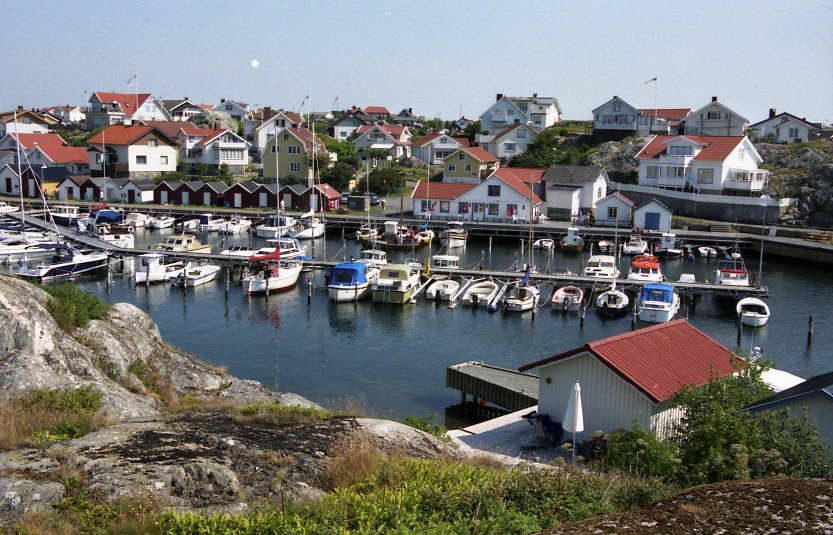

- Location within Västra Götaland Location within Sweden
- Coordinates: 57°40′N 11°40′E
- Country: Sweden
- Province: Bohuslän
- County: Västra Götaland County
- Municipality: Öckerö Municipality

Area
  - Total: 0.35 km^{2} (0.14 sq mi)

Population (31 December 2010)
  - Total: 620
  - Density: 1,751/km^{2} (4,540/sq mi)
- Time zone: UTC+1 (CET)
  - Summer (DST): UTC+2 (CEST)

Fotö is an island and a locality in Öckerö Municipality, Västra Götaland County, Sweden, with 620 inhabitants in 2010. It is connected to the island of Hönö with bridge.

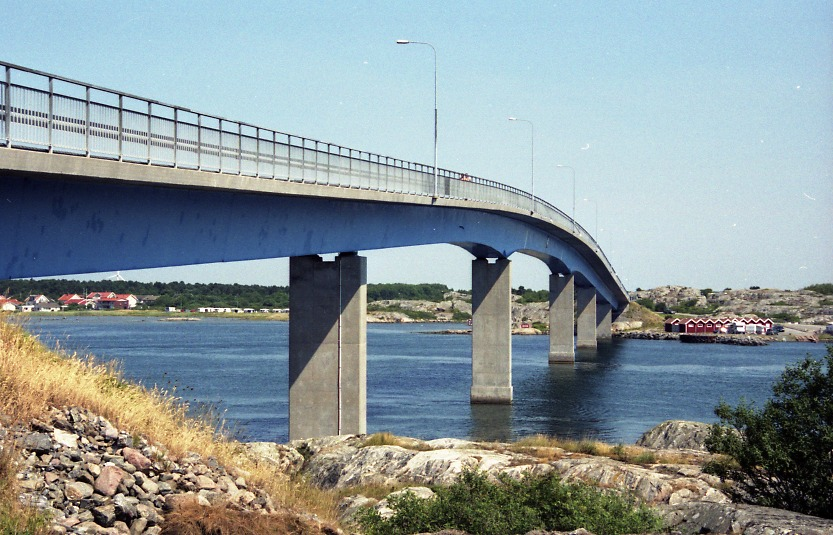
The bridge
