= Bohus-Björkö =

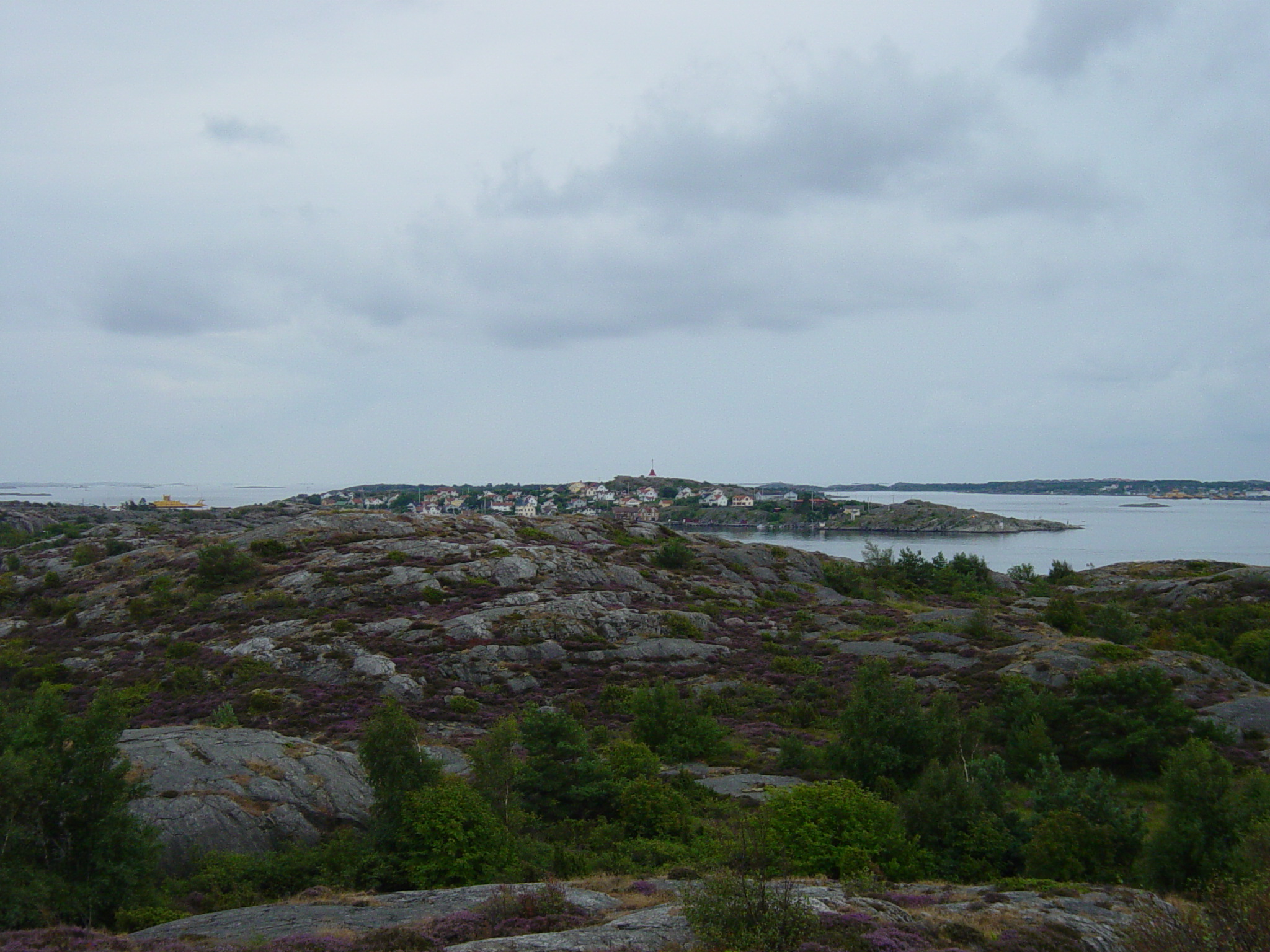
- Bohus-Björkö

- Location within Västra Götaland Location within Sweden
- Coordinates: 57°44′N 11°41′E
- Country: Sweden
- Province: Bohuslän
- County: Västra Götaland County
- Municipality: Öckerö Municipality

Area
  - Total: 0.91 km^{2} (0.35 sq mi)

Population (31 December 2010)
  - Total: 1,427
  - Density: 1,571/km^{2} (4,070/sq mi)
- Time zone: UTC+1 (CET)
  - Summer (DST): UTC+2 (CEST)

Bohus-Björkö (Swedish: [ˌbuːhʉs ˈbjœrˌkøː]), also simply known as Björkö, is a locality situated in Öckerö Municipality, Västra Götaland County, Sweden with 1,427 inhabitants in 2010.

== Sports ==
The following sports clubs are located in Björkö:

- IFK Björkö

== Notable people ==
- Felicia Schröder (born 2007), professional footballer
