= Vrångö =

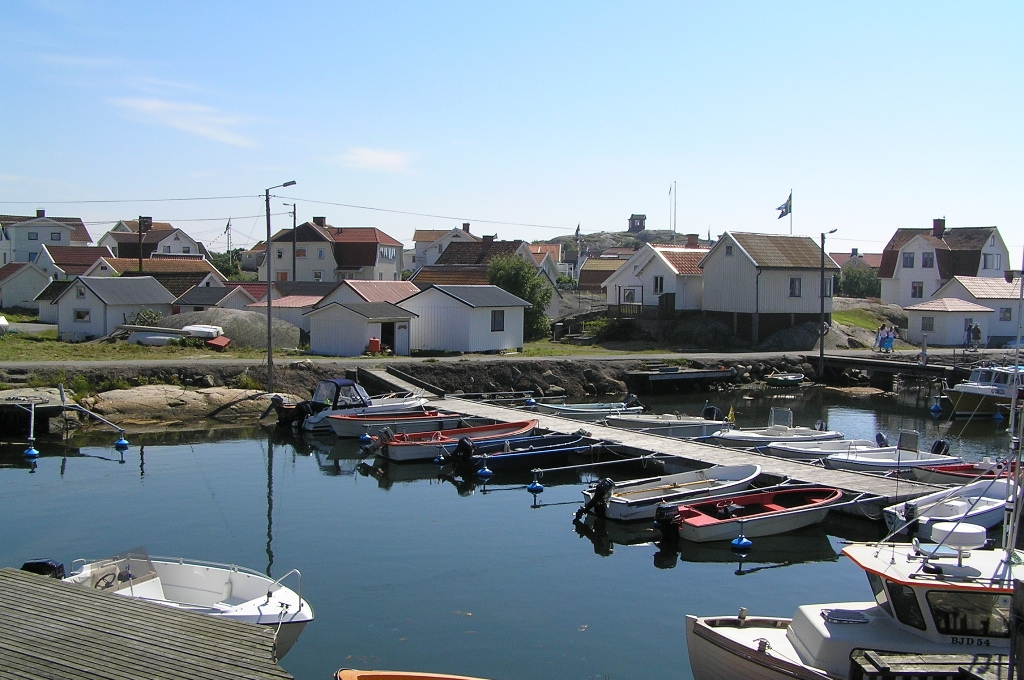

- Location within Västra Götaland Location within Sweden
- Coordinates: 57°34′N 11°47′E
- Country: Sweden
- Province: Västergötland
- County: Västra Götaland County
- Municipality: Gothenburg Municipality

Area
  - Total: 0.40 km^{2} (0.15 sq mi)

Population (31 December 2010)
  - Total: 364
  - Density: 919/km^{2} (2,380/sq mi)
- Time zone: UTC+1 (CET)
  - Summer (DST): UTC+2 (CEST)

Vrångö is the southernmost inhabited island in the Southern Gothenburg Archipelago and it is also a locality situated in Gothenburg Municipality, Västra Götaland County, Sweden. It had 364 inhabitants in 2010. The ferry 281 to Vrångö can be taken from Saltholmen.

The island has an old cemetery from the 1600s.
