= Hönö =

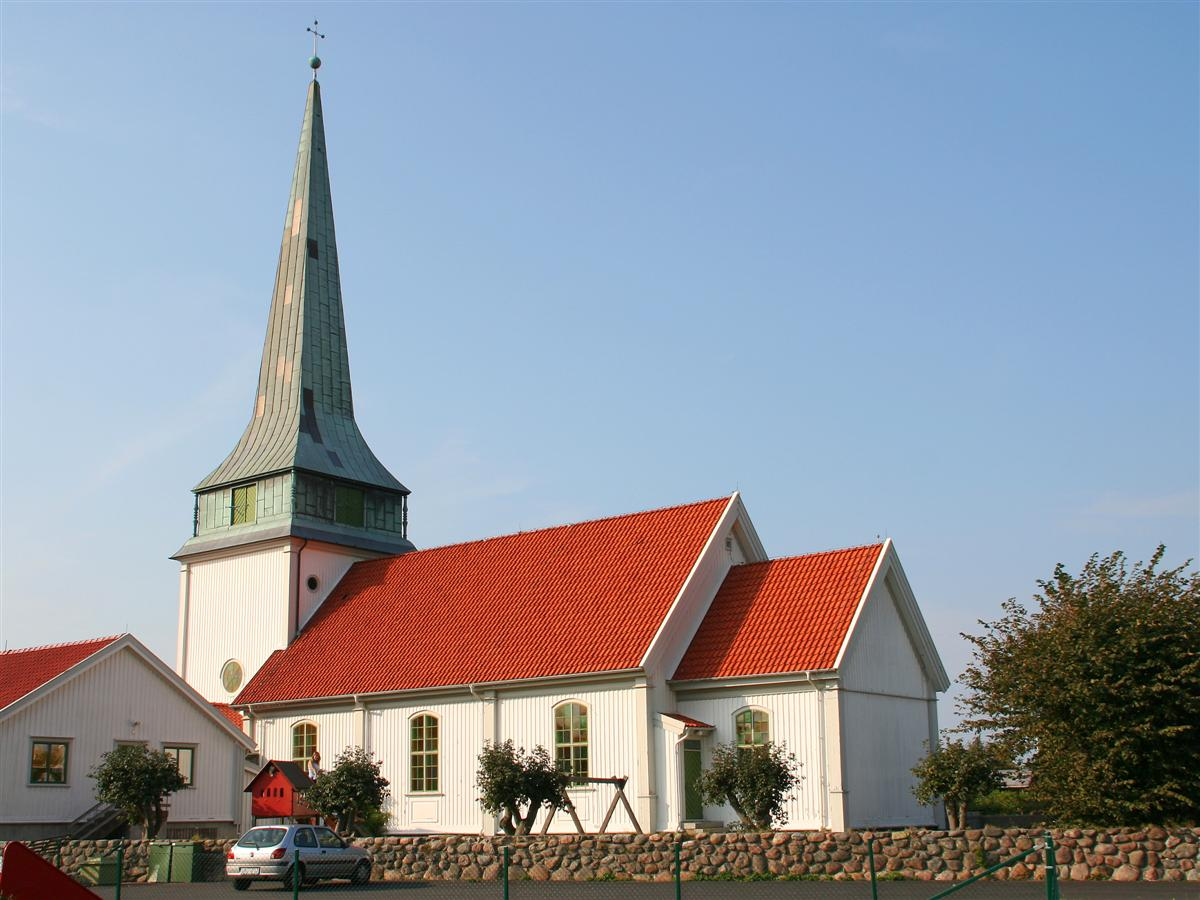
- Hönö church

- Location within Västra Götaland Location within Sweden
- Coordinates: 57°46′N 11°42′E
- Country: Sweden
- Province: Bohuslän
- County: Västra Götaland County
- Municipality: Öckerö Municipality

Area
  - Total: 3.06 km^{2} (1.18 sq mi)

Population (31 December 2010)
  - Total: 5,110
  - Density: 1,668/km^{2} (4,320/sq mi)
- Time zone: UTC+1 (CET)
  - Summer (DST): UTC+2 (CEST)

Hönö is a locality situated in Öckerö Municipality, Västra Götaland County, Sweden with 5,110 inhabitants in 2010.
