= Öckerö =

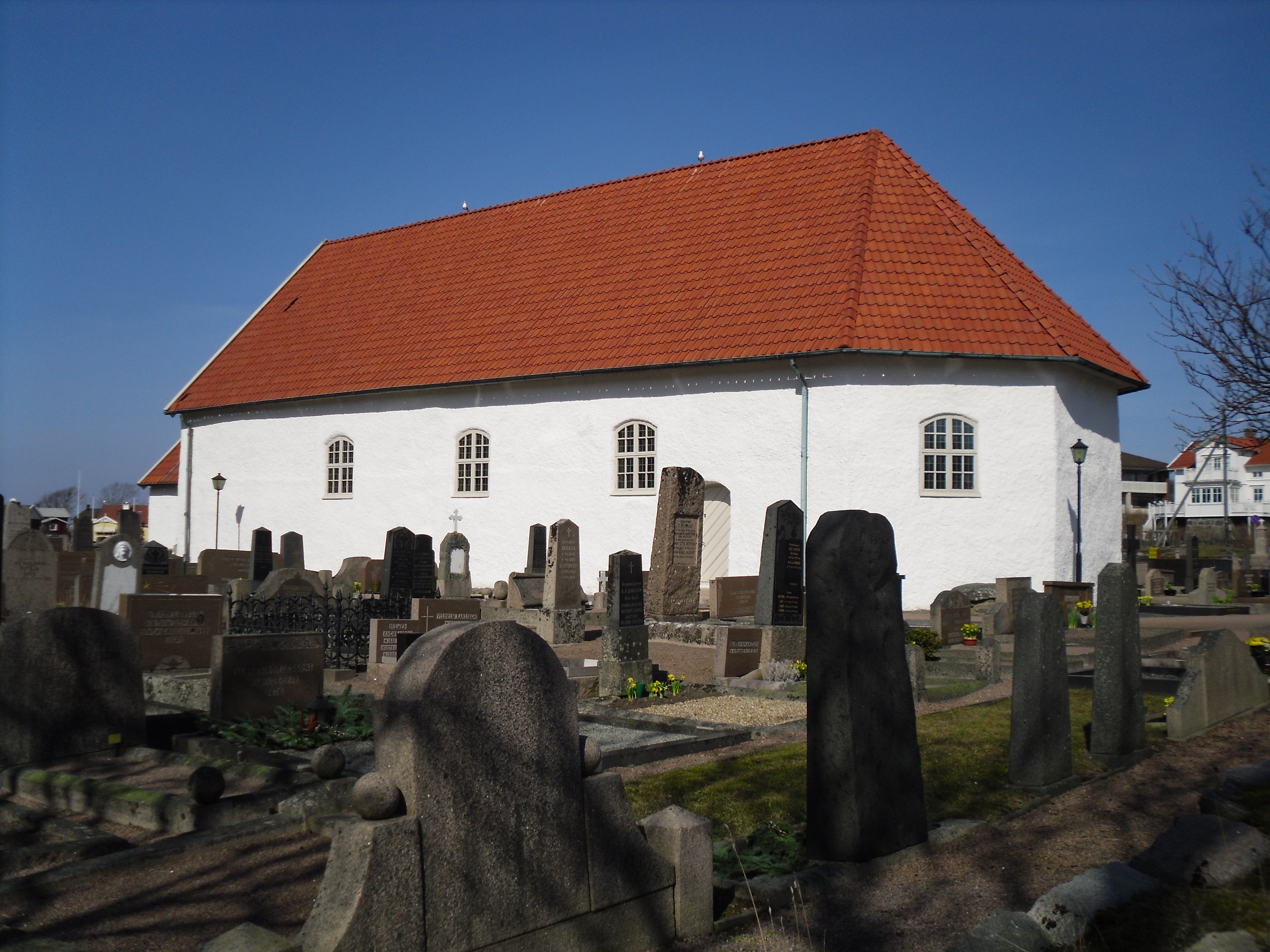
- Öckerö Old Church

- Location within Västra Götaland Location within Sweden
- Coordinates: 57°42′N 11°39′E
- Country: Sweden
- Province: Bohuslän
- County: Västra Götaland County
- Municipality: Öckerö Municipality

Area
  - Total: 2.42 km^{2} (0.93 sq mi)

Population (31 December 2010)
  - Total: 3,488
  - Density: 1,439/km^{2} (3,730/sq mi)
- Time zone: UTC+1 (CET)
  - Summer (DST): UTC+2 (CEST)

Öckerö (Swedish pronunciation: [œˈkɛrøː]) is an island and a locality and the seat of Öckerö Municipality, Västra Götaland County, Sweden with 3,488 inhabitants in 2010.

== Sports ==
The following sports clubs are located in Öckerö:

- Öckerö IF
