= Kämpersvik =

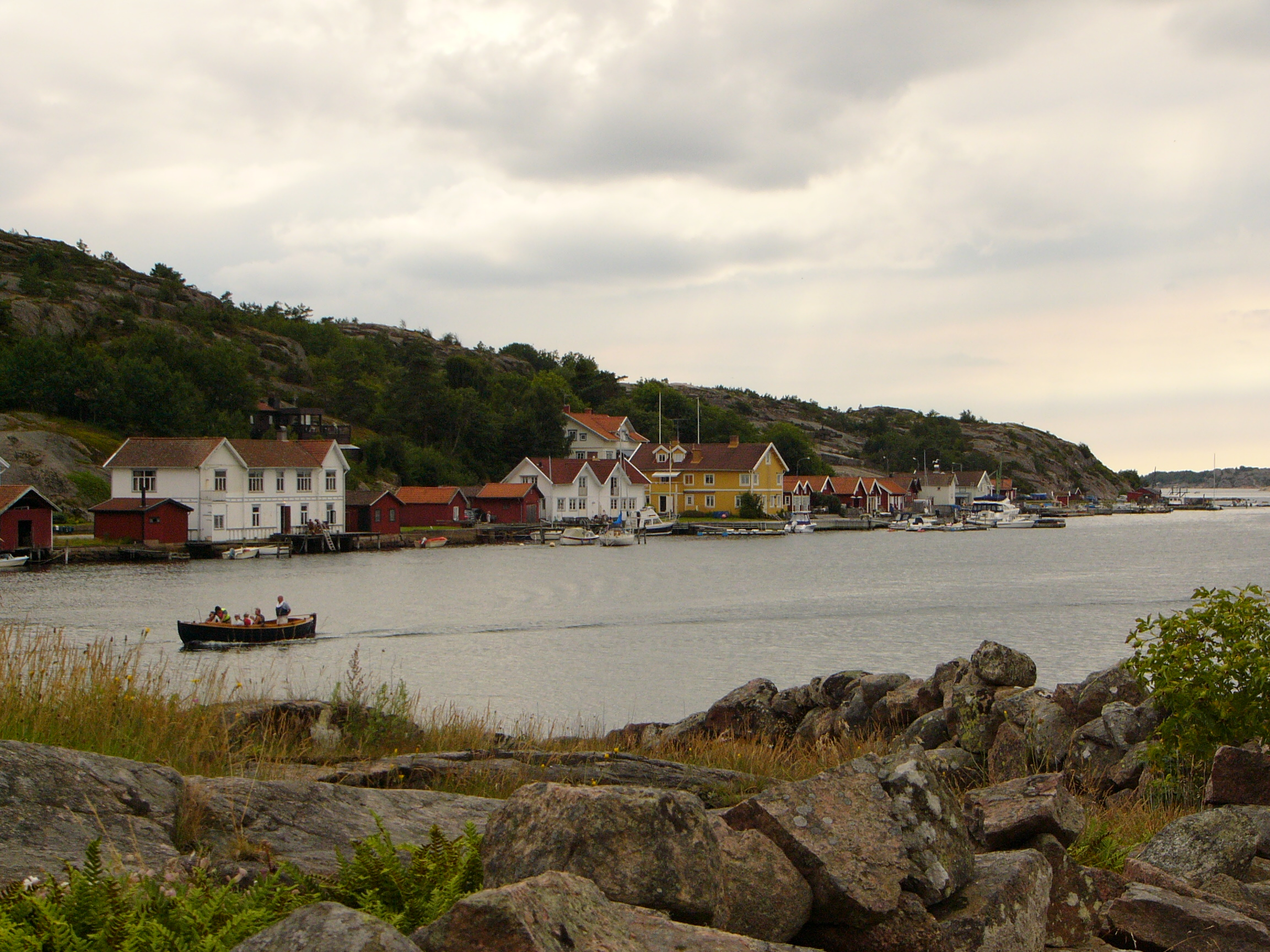
- West Kämpersvik

- Location within Västra Götaland Location within Sweden
- Coordinates: 58°38′51″N 11°17′14″E
- Country: Sweden
- Province: Bohuslän
- County: Västra Götaland
- Municipality: Tanum

Area
  - Total: 0.17 km^{2} (0.066 sq mi)

Population (2010)
  - Total: 60
  - Density: 355/km^{2} (920/sq mi)
- Time zone: UTC+1 (CET)
  - Summer (DST): UTC+2 (CEST)
- Website: kampersvik.se

Kämpersvik is a coastal smaller locality in Tanum Municipality, Bohuslän, Sweden. It has a population of 60 inhabitants and is located 5 kilometres south of the town of Grebbestad, to the west of the road leading to Fjällbacka.
