= Tanum Municipality =

Tanum Municipality Tanums kommun
- Municipality
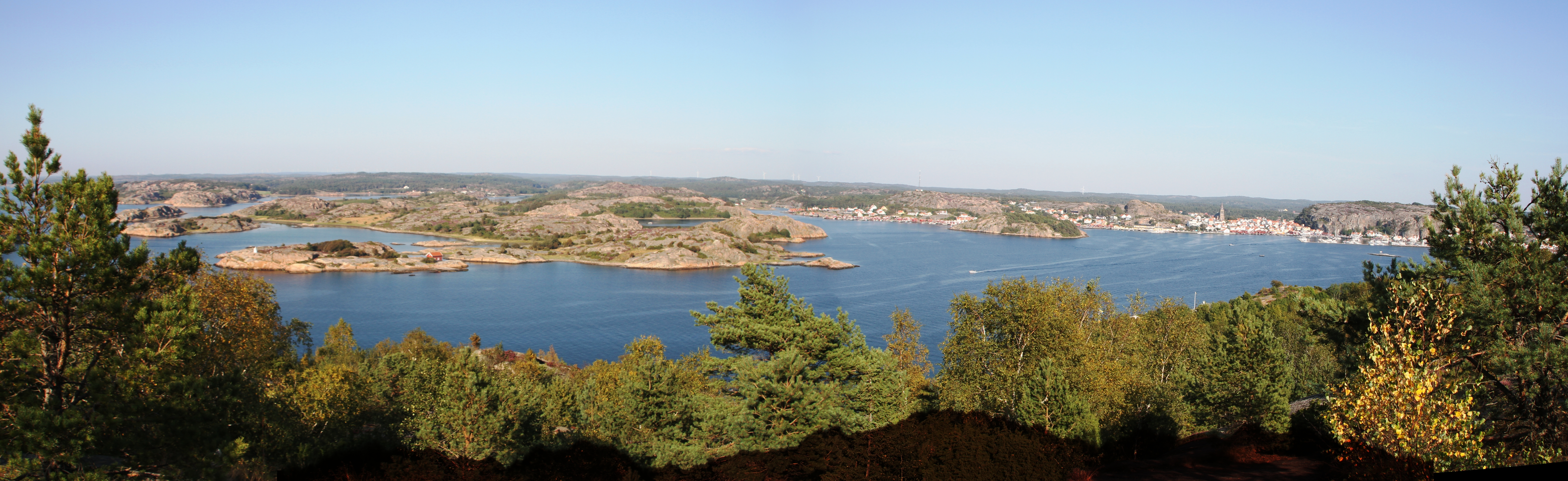

- Coat of arms

- Coordinates: 58°43′N 11°19′E
- Country: Sweden
- County: Västra Götaland County
- Seat: Tanumshede

Area
  - Total: 2,351.35 km^{2} (907.86 sq mi)
  - Land: 917.24 km^{2} (354.15 sq mi)
  - Water: 1,434.11 km^{2} (553.71 sq mi)

Population (30 June 2025)
  - Total: 12,757
  - Density: 13.908/km^{2} (36.022/sq mi)
- Time zone: UTC+1 (CET)
  - Summer (DST): UTC+2 (CEST)
- ISO 3166 code: SE
- Province: Bohuslän
- Municipal code: 1435
- Website: www.tanum.se

Tanum Municipality (Swedish: Tanums kommun; IPA: [ˈtânːɵm]) is a municipality in Västra Götaland County in southwestern Sweden. Its seat is the town of Tanumshede, with 1,600 inhabitants.

The present municipality was formed in 1971 through the amalgamation of three former units. Before the subdivision reform of 1952, there were seven entities in the area.

== Etymology ==
The parish is named after the old farm Tanum (Norse Túnheimr), since the first church was built there. The first element is tún 'country courtyard', the last element is heimr 'homestead, farm'.

== Localities ==
- Grebbestad
- Fjällbacka
- Hamburgsund
- Kämpersvik
- Rabbalshede
- Tanumshede
- Bullaren

== Demographics ==
This is a demographic table based on Tanum Municipality's electoral districts in the 2022 Swedish general election sourced from SVT's election platform, in turn taken from SCB official statistics.

In total there were 12,959 residents, including 10,274 Swedish citizens of voting age. 41.4% voted for the left coalition and 57.5% for the right coalition. Indicators are in percentage points except population totals and income.

Location	Residents	Citizen adults	Left vote	Right vote	Employed	Swedish parents	Foreign heritage	Income SEK	Degree
Location			%	%					
Bullaren	1,483	1,185	33.4	64.5	81	89	11	24,701	25
Fjällbacka	1,175	990	39.5	60.1	78	86	14	25,583	35
Grebbestad N	1,485	1,205	38.5	60.7	80	90	10	27,126	38
Grebbestad S	1,438	1,201	36.2	63.1	81	89	11	26,443	36
Hamburgsund	1,837	1,555	53.7	46.1	83	92	8	23,768	48
Kville-Rabbalshede	1,644	1,295	44.0	54.8	85	93	7	25,205	30
Tanumshede	2,018	1,451	40.2	57.9	76	71	29	23,129	23
Tanumshede-Lur	1,879	1,392	39.1	59.6	73	79	21	21,712	29
Source: SVT

== Sights ==
A rock carving at Tanum

The rock carvings at Tanum have been declared a UNESCO World Heritage Site. The heritage area is located around the seat of Tanumshede, covering an area of 18 km^{2}.

Most carvings show men and ships. Several show animals such as oxen and horses.

Tanum Municipality has made its rock carving the subject of its coat of arms.

The Greby grave field, the largest grave field in Bohuslän, lies near the locality of Grebbestad.

Tanum is one of the first municipalities to require urine separation toilets to help combat the looming global shortage of phosphorus.
