= Greby =

Iron Age grave field in Sweden

Coordinates: 58°42′03″N 11°15′40″E

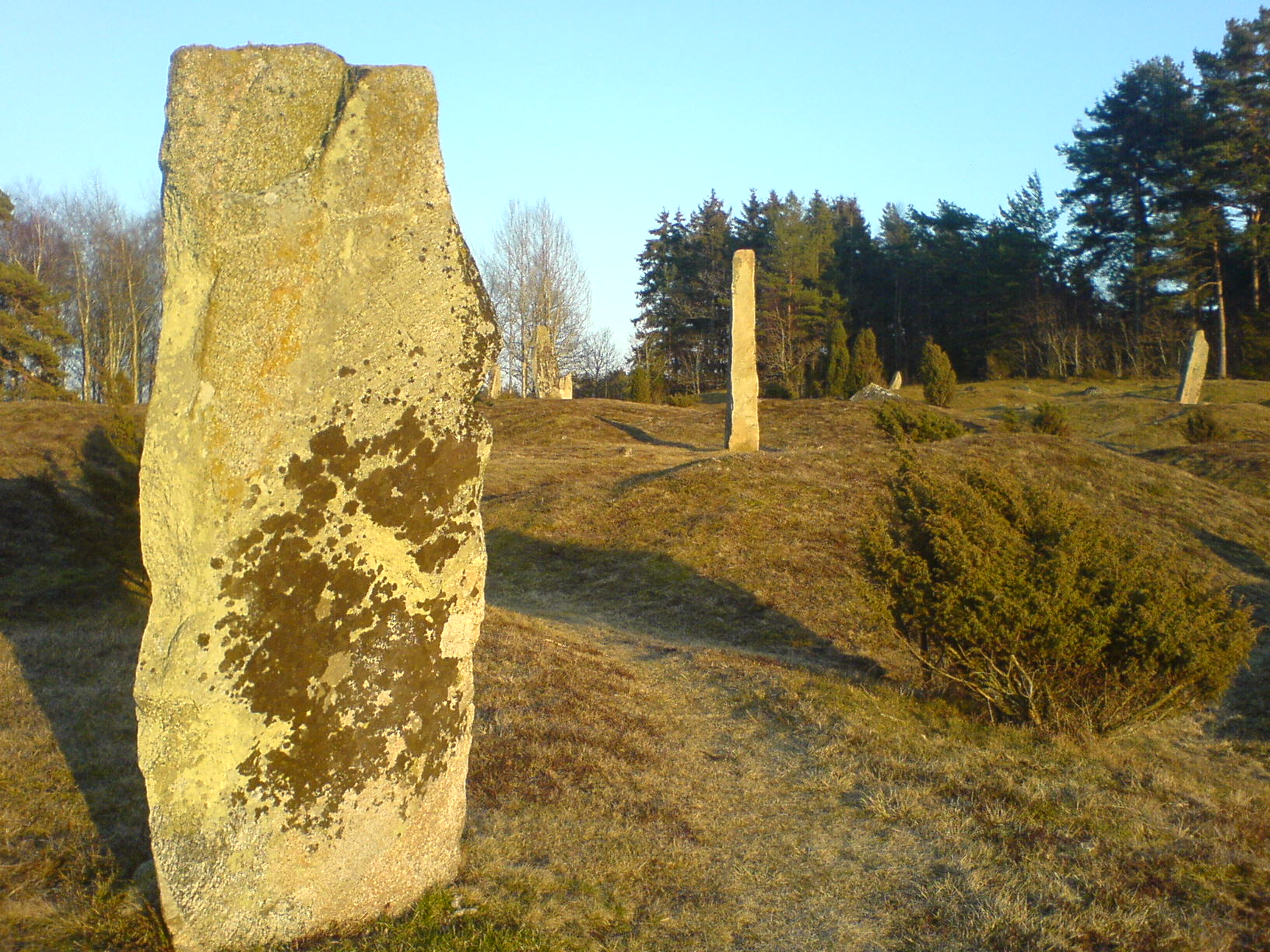
Greby grave field in March 2007

The Greby grave field (Swedish: Greby gravfält) is an Iron Age grave field in western Sweden. It is located north of Grebbestad, Tanum Municipality in Västra Götaland County. With its 220 graves, it is the largest site of this kind in Bohuslän.

In June 1873, Swedish archaeologist and cultural historian Oscar Montelius (1843–1921) examined eleven of the graves. The grave inventory included glass pearls, bone combs and other everyday objects, dating to the time of migration (approx. 400-500 AD). Similar artifacts have been found in a number of other places in Sweden as well as in Norway, Germany and England

Newer findings indicate that Greby might have been an ancient trading site.
