= Andalen =

- Location within Västra Götaland Location within Sweden
- Coordinates: 57°42′N 11°45′E
- Country: Sweden
- Province: Bohuslän
- County: Västra Götaland County
- Municipality: Göteborg Municipality

Area
  - Total: 1.58 km^{2} (0.61 sq mi)

Population (31 December 2010)
  - Total: 2,188
  - Density: 1,382/km^{2} (3,580/sq mi)
- Time zone: UTC+1 (CET)
  - Summer (DST): UTC+2 (CEST)

Andalen is a locality situated in Gothenburg Municipality, Västra Götaland County, Sweden. It had 2,188 inhabitants in 2010.
