= Hamburgsund =

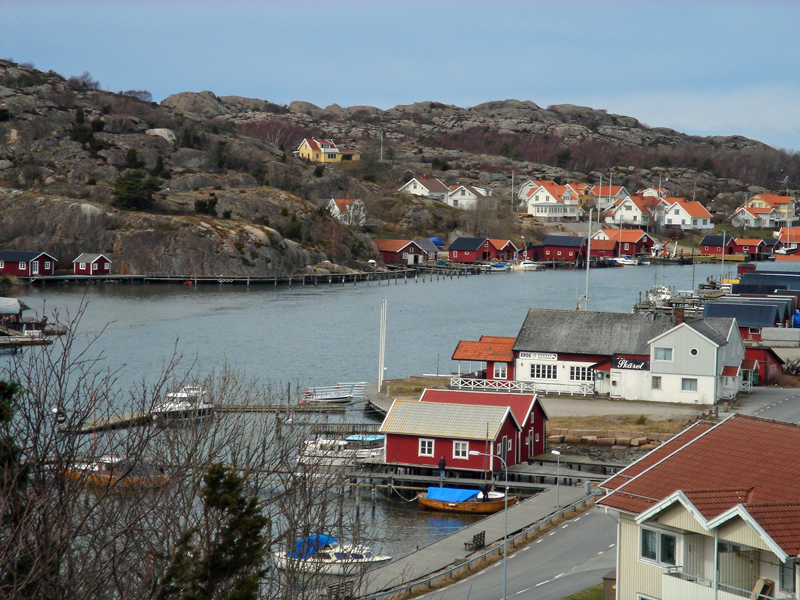

- Location within Västra Götaland Location within Sweden
- Coordinates: 58°33′N 11°16′E
- Country: Sweden
- Province: Bohuslän
- County: Västra Götaland County
- Municipality: Tanum Municipality

Area
  - Total: 1.01 km^{2} (0.39 sq mi)

Population (31 December 2010)
  - Total: 818
  - Density: 808/km^{2} (2,090/sq mi)
- Time zone: UTC+1 (CET)
  - Summer (DST): UTC+2 (CEST)

Hamburgsund (lit. Hamburg strait)is a locality situated in Tanum Municipality, Västra Götaland County, Sweden with 818 inhabitants in 2010. Despite its name, Hamburgsund is not known for hamburgers nor does it have any connection to the city of Hamburg. The name comes from the nearby island of Hamburgö (lit. 'Hamburg isle'), which also has no connection to neither Hamburg or hamburgers. It's speculated that the name evovled from "Hornbora", meaning 'the horned one'.
