= Dragsmark Abbey =

Ruins of Premonstratensian canonry in Bohuslän, Sweden

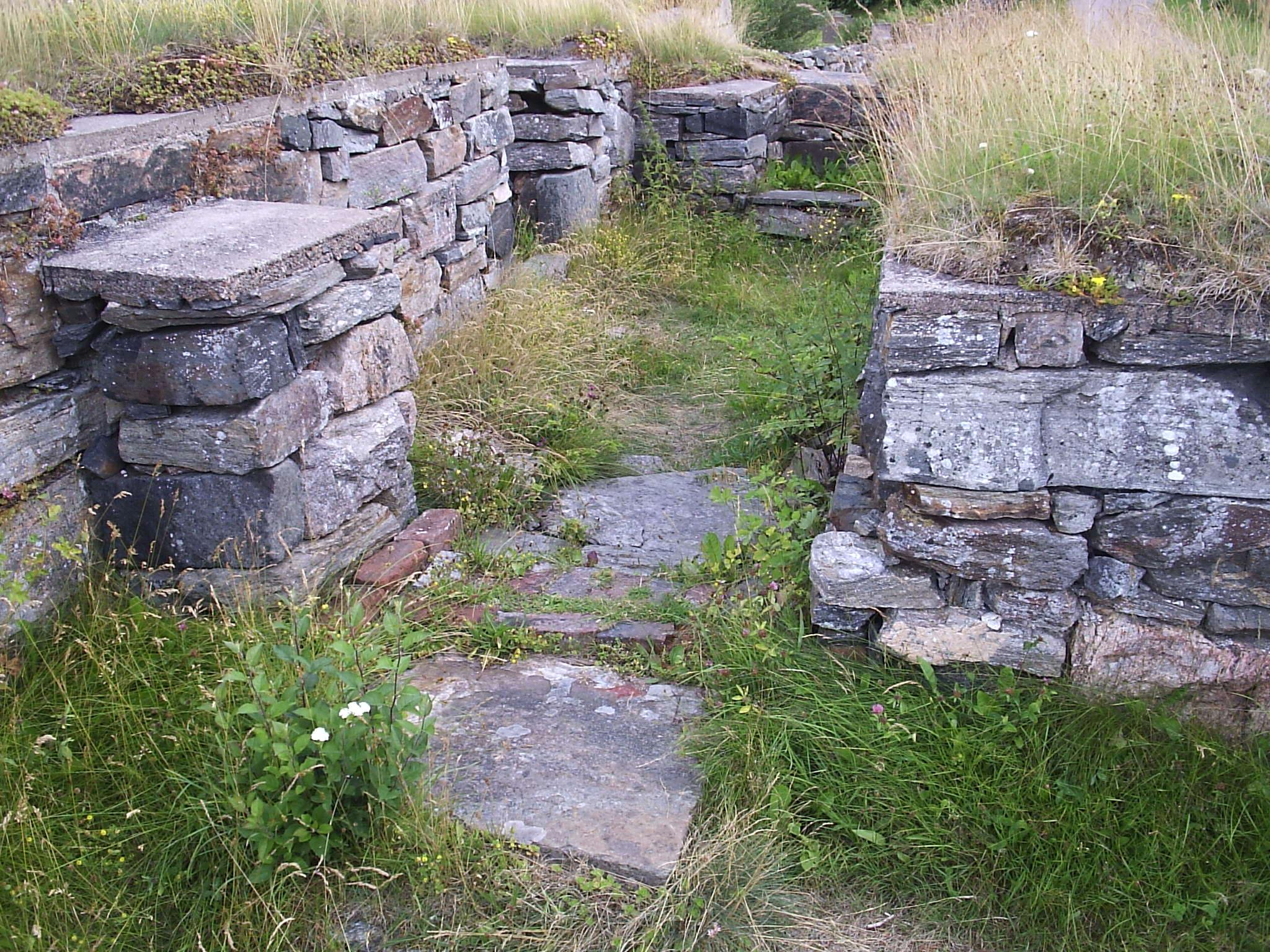
- Dragsmark Abbey ruins: entrance to church

- Location within Västra Götaland
- Interactive map of Dragsmark Abbey

Monastery information
- Order: Premonstratensians
- Established: before 1260
- Disestablished: 1532

People
- Founder: Håkon Håkonsson

Site
- Location: Bohuslän, Sweden
- Coordinates: 58°15′6.78″N 11°33′4.51″E

Dragsmark Abbey (Swedish: Dragsmarks kloster) was a Premonstratensian canonry in Båhuslen, formerly Norway, now Bohuslän, Sweden.

== History ==
The monastery at Dragsmark, also known as "Marieskog" in Norwegian, was founded some time before 1260, with the support of King Håkon Håkonsson, and was dedicated to the Blessed Virgin Mary.

The abbey was very wealthy in its heyday and ran a prestigious school, but declined during the 15th century, and as early as 1519 was in the control of a lay administrator, the first monastery in Norway to be secularised. With the Reformation the Crown granted it to a tenant in 1532, with a condition that the remaining canons had to be maintained. The buildings fell into disrepair, and in 1610 were used as a quarry for stone for the construction of Båhus Fortress.

== Site ==
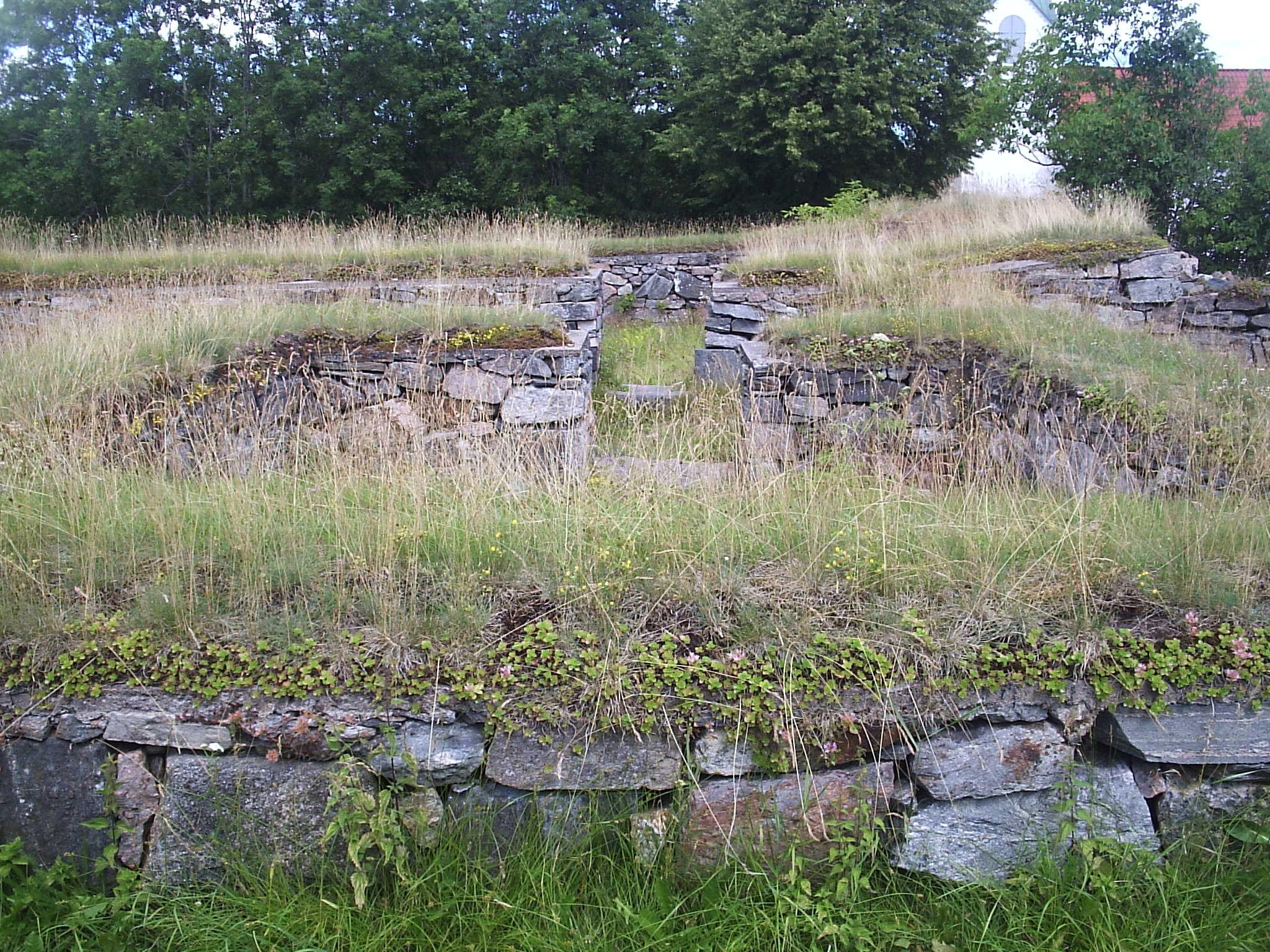
Dragsmark Abbey ruins: chapter house

The monastery ruins are on the west of Bokenäset on the fjord between Uddevalla and the sea, north of the island of Orust.

In 1897-98 the ruins were investigated. The church measured about 20 metres by 10 metres, with the conventual buildings to the south, but only two chambers nearest the church have been explored, probably the sacristy and the chapter house. There are traces of other buildings further to the south, and to the west the remains of another building, the relation of which to the rest of the site is not clear.

== Sources ==
- Norges klostre i middelalderen: Dragsmark (in Norwegian)
