= Tanumshede =

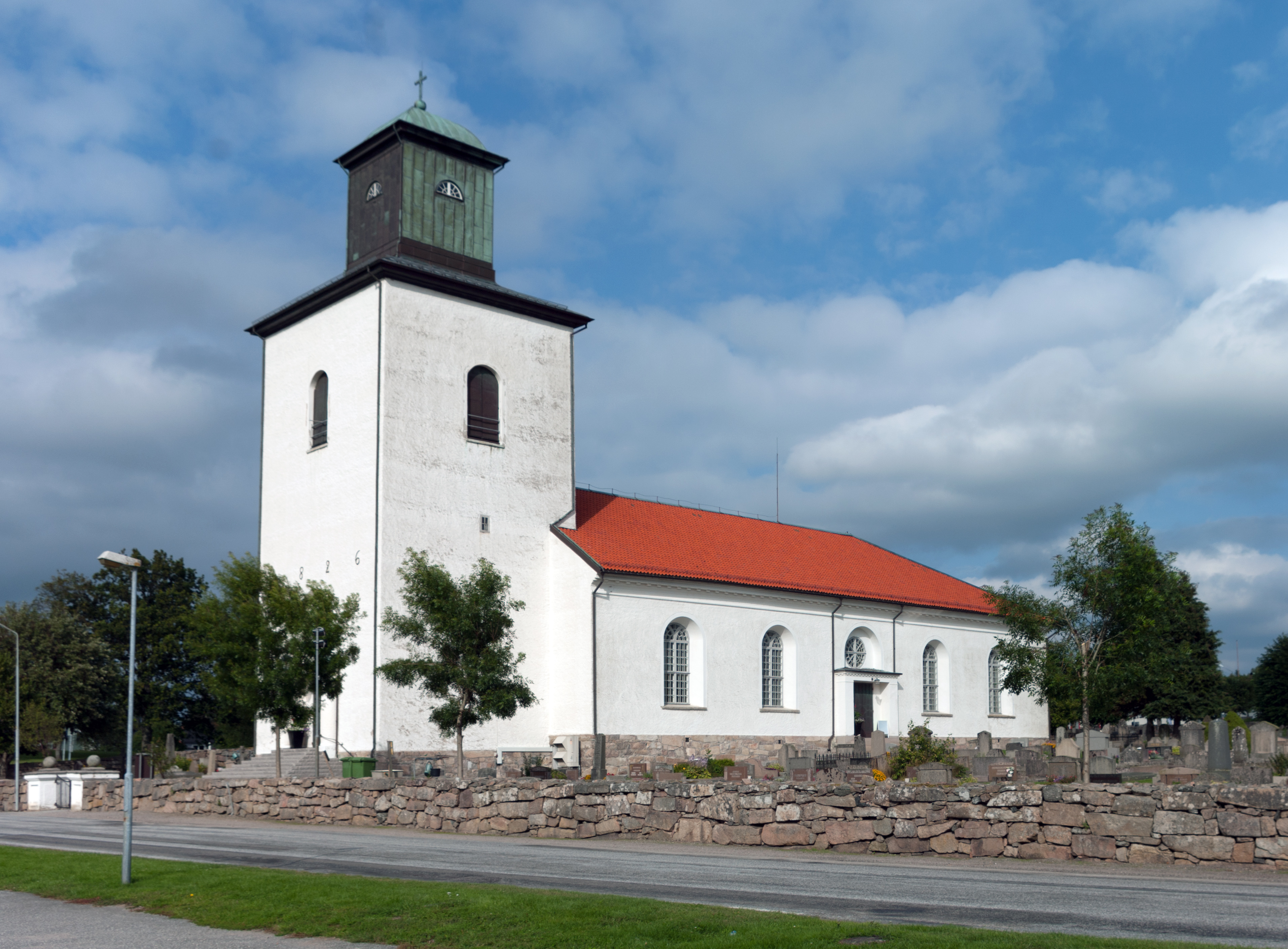
- Tanum Church in August 2015

- Location within Västra Götaland Location within Sweden
- Coordinates: 58°43′25″N 11°19′25″E
- Country: Sweden
- Province: Bohuslän
- County: Västra Götaland County
- Municipality: Tanum Municipality

Area
  - Total: 1.87 km^{2} (0.72 sq mi)

Population (2020)
  - Total: 2,043
  - Density: 905/km^{2} (2,340/sq mi)
- Time zone: UTC+1 (CET)
  - Summer (DST): UTC+2 (CEST)

Tanumshede is a locality and the seat of Tanum Municipality in Västra Götaland County, Sweden with 1,697 inhabitants in 2010.

== See also ==
- Rock Carvings in Tanum
