= Elin i Staxäng =

Swedish folk healer executed for witchcraft (died 1671)

Elin i Staxäng (née Andersdotter; died 22 June 1671, Kungälv) was a Swedish folk healer, who was accused of witchcraft during the Great Noise Witch Trials of 1668 to 1676. Put on trial alongside her husband Iver Rearsson i Staxäng, the couple were executed together and belong to the known victims of the Great Noise Witch Trials of Bohuslän.

== Life ==
Elin Andersdotter married the farmer Iver Reorsson i Staxäng in Bro socken in Stångenäs härad in Bohuslän. While unmarried, she was known by her patronymicon Andersdotter, but as a married woman, Elin Andersdotter became known as Elin i Staxäng, "Elin of Staxäng", efter her husband's farm Staxäng. Her husband also had his own fishing boat. The birth year of her and her husband is not explicitly given, but they appear to have been fairly young, and Elin is noted to have been pregnant during the three-year-long process against her. It appeared that both Elin and Iver were active in selling claimed magical services for money as cunning folk.

In 1668, a witch hysteria took place in Sweden known as the Great noise. In June 1669, the first witchcraft case in Bohuslän during the Great noise took place when Anna i Holta was charged with sorcery in Marstrand.

The witchcraft cases in Bohuslän had a very different character than those in the rest of the country, since they did not involve witches abducting children to the Witches' Sabbath in Blockula, and were thus not really connected to the rest of the Great noise witch trials. Nevertheless, when a witchcraft case occurred in Bohuslän as well, the authorities in the capital became concerned that the witch hunt should spread also to this part of the country.

The Governor was therefore given an order to conduct an investigation of all witchcraft in the County of Bohuslän. After the case of Marstrand, it was followed by the investigation against Malin i Viken in Mollösund, and then finally against Elin i Staxäng in Stångenäs.

=== First trial ===
On 27 August 1669, Elin i Staxäng stood trial in Bro in Stångenäs in the presence of Governor Gustaf Farther.

The Custom official Per Henriksson i Lysekil claimed that in 1663, he had visited Elin to inquire about her husband's fishing boat, which Henriksson had confiscated in his capacity of a custom official. Elin told him to leave her husband alone, or misfortune would befall him. Henriksson claimed, that on his way back from Elin a sudden whiff of wind had knocked him of his saddle, and he fell into the ditch. His horse had sunk when the ice broke under. The boat he had confiscated from Iver had been lost at sea, and he suspected that Elin had caused the boat to sink by use of sorcery.

Anna Olofsdotter, wife of the milner Halward i Holma in Berfendals socken, claimed that Elin had cast a spell on her. She explained that Elin had employed her husband to grind for her. After her husband had performed this task for the "witch", however, Anna had fallen ill with "weakness, a heavy mind, etcetera". Anna asked the "husband of the witch", Iver, who told her to employ the services of a male folk healer in a neighboring parish: "It is your blood that changed when you got angry. But there is a man in Foss socken. His name i Jacob Klockare. Go to him, and you will be fine", and Anna had indeed been well after that.

Elin denied the charges. She was given the opportunity to declare herself free if she could call eleven character witnesses to swear on her innocence, with herself as the twelfth. Her husband summoned eleven men to swear for her. When they were summoned, however, the men stated for the court that while they had no knowledge of the charges, they could not swear on Elin's innocence, because of her longstanding reputation for sorcery. Having failed to gather character witnesses to swear for her, Elin was subjected to the ordeal by water. She failed the test when she "floated and swam on the water like a bird".

=== Second trial ===
In August 1669, the government order for a Witchcraft Commission to be formed to deal with the witchcraft cases in Bohuslän. In January 1670, the trial against Elin was resumed.

Elin's accuser, Per Henriksson, stood by his former accusation against her.

The accusation made by the milner's wife Anna Olofsdotter, however, was somewhat discredited. It was revealed that when the milner Halward had grinded for Elin, his wife Anna had caught them embracing, and it was this that had caused Anna to become "ill" with jealousy. Anna had visited Elin and asked her to remove the spell she accused her of having given her, but Elin had denied having done such a thing. It was after this Anna had gone to Elin's husband Iver and asked his advice, and he had advised her to visit Jacob Klockare (who was now dead), to remove what she thought was a spell. Both Elin and Iver said that they believed that Anna had become "ill" because of jealousy and not because of witchcraft.

During this trial, new accusations were put forward. Elin was stated to trade in magical services. In 1659, Elin had been employed by a noblewoman on the Åby manor. This noblewoman was stated to have been the unmarried lady Anna Fricks, whose father, the lord of Åby manor, had betrothed her against her will to a rich older man by the name Ahlefeldt. Fricks's maidservant Elisabeth from Stångenäs had offered to consult Elin, and Anna Fricks had done so. Elin had advised Fricks to perform a number of magical rituals in order to cause her undesirable fiancé to feel disgust for her and thus break the engagement. Per Skotte testified that he had been used by Fricks as a messenger between her and Elin, and Per Eriksson Lifskytt testified that he had escorted Elin to Åby manor on several occasions when Fricks wished to consult her.

Elin continued to deny the accusations also after having failed the ordeal of water. She was now subjected to torture. She continued to deny that she had performed any sorcery herself. She did however admit that her husband had engaged a fortune teller from Dalsland for Anna Fricks, and that she and her husband had visited Ingri Glasmästars in the city of Marstrand, whom Fricks had engaged for magical services. She thus claimed that she and her husband had merely acted as messengers between Fricks and the actual sorcerers.

Her husband Iver was summoned and questioned about his visit with Elin in Marstrand on the assignment of Fricks. He denied that the visit had anything to do with sorcery and that Fricks had employed Ingri Glasmästers for medical treatment, and not for witchcraft. However, this testimony caused Iver to be arrested and charged for sorcery himself and accused as the accomplice of his wife.

Elin was now subjected to further torture. She confessed to have purchased things from Ingri Glasmästers and Anna i Holte in Marstrand on the assignment of Fricks but denied that she had used these objects to perform sorcery for Fricks. Ingri Glasmästers and Anna i Holte were both women who were charged for witchcraft in Marstrand. The Court ordered her to be tortured for the third time, and harder than before.

According to the protocol, she was hanged up in strappado and asked to confess, but did not appear much affected, and eventually asked the hangman to let her down, and she would give him a kiss.

She was taken back to prison. It appears that Elin thought herself doomed beforehand. Being pregnant, she asked to be able to give birth before her execution so that the child would not be burned with her. When the court was informed that she was pregnant, the proceedings were postponed.

=== Third trial ===
On 25 September 1670, the trial against Elin and her husband Iver was resumed by the Witchcraft Commission in Tega outside of Kungälv.

Both Elin and Iver denied the charges and threatened to sue the court for slander. It was during the third trial, however, that Elin finally confessed her guilt. According to the commission, she did so willingly without pressure or torture. In her confession, Elin stated that she had been initiated in witchcraft by the infamous witch Ingri Glasmästars in Marstrand when she had been sent to her on assignment by Anna Fricks; that she had been introduced to Satan and made a pact with him; that she had been given a "Grey Boy" as her servant by Satan and visited the Witches' Sabbath in Blockula regularly flying on a cutting board; and that Satan visited her and had sexual intercourse with her.

In her first confession, Elin denied that her husband was implicated and instead claimed that when she visited the witches' sabbath, she had left a piece of enchanted wood in the marital bed that took her place during her absence so that her husband never noticed her absence. After having been subjected to pressure, however, she changed her confession in order to implicate Iver as her accomplice. In her second confession, she confessed that Ingri Glasmästers had given her an apple. She had eaten one bit of the apple three Thursdays in a row, after which the Devil had appeared and wrote her name in his book with blood from her left little finger. Her husband had been informed and initiated himself, and he had accompanied her on her visits to Satan.

She then named seven women as her accomplices: Karin Klockars, Malin Nils Fredrikssons, Karin Joens, Rangela sunnan för bron, Ingri Jon Håkanssons, Karin Olufs and a woman whose name she claimed not to know. She also confessed on having had several children with Satan.

When Iver Rearsson i Staxäng was confronted with his wife's testimony against him, he was threatened with torture if he did not confess. He then confessed without having been tortured, and repeated his wife's confession almost word for word; though he noted that when Satan wrote his name in the book, it was with blood from his right finger, not his left, and that the servant he had been given had been a calf, and described the musicians at the witches' sabbath as small grey boys.

He then named two accomplices who were already imprisoned in Marstrand, Malin Ruths and Per Mattsson; when he was threatened with torture, he named one man and three women as well, all of whom were confirmed as witches by his wife: Jöns i Vräland, Per Holländars widow, Börta Cornelis and Catharina Bengts.

=== Verdict and execution ===
On 15 February 1671, both Elin and Iver i Staxäng were judged guilty as charged for witchcraft and sentenced to death. The Witcraft Commission considered their crimes so serious that they should be burned alive, but since the king had banned people from being burned alive, they received the customary sentence of being decapitated before burning.

In June 1671, the Witchcraft Commission opened procedures in Kungälv. The people accused by Elin and Iver were to be put on trial, followed by the execution of Elin and Iver.

Elin and Iver were kept alive in order to testify against the people they had named as their accomplices, and brought to Uddewalla, where this was to take place.

One of their accused accomplices was Elin's aunt, Karin Joens. When she was confronted with Elin she told her niece: "God forgive you, how you lie on me", and then asked the court to tell her what they wanted her to say, "to make you happy".

Elin testified against Pedher Mathsson and Börtha Cornelius, who were both executed; and against Catharina Bengts, Ingrid Jon Håkanssons, Börta Peter Holländers and Karin Joens, who were acquitted.

Elin and Iver were both described as being in very bad condition after having spent the winter of 1670–1671 in prison. Despite described as young and healthy when she was first imprisoned, she was reportedly so exhausted during her testimony against her alleged accomplices that she sometimes confused one person with another.

In the summer of 1671, the Witchcraft Commission reported to their superiors that Elin and Iver were in such a bad condition in prison that it was necessary to "hurry them to execution" or they would both be dead before they could be executed.

Elin and Iver were executed together in Kungälv on 22 July 1671. Both of them retracted their confessions as well as their accusations against others before their execution. Iver stated that he had been forced to confess and that he had done so only out of consideration for his wife. Elin stated that she regretted that she had lied about herself as well as others, that she considered this to be a sin and asked the priests if she could be saved in the afterlife despite these lies.
