= Lisa Emelia Svensson =

Swedish diplomat

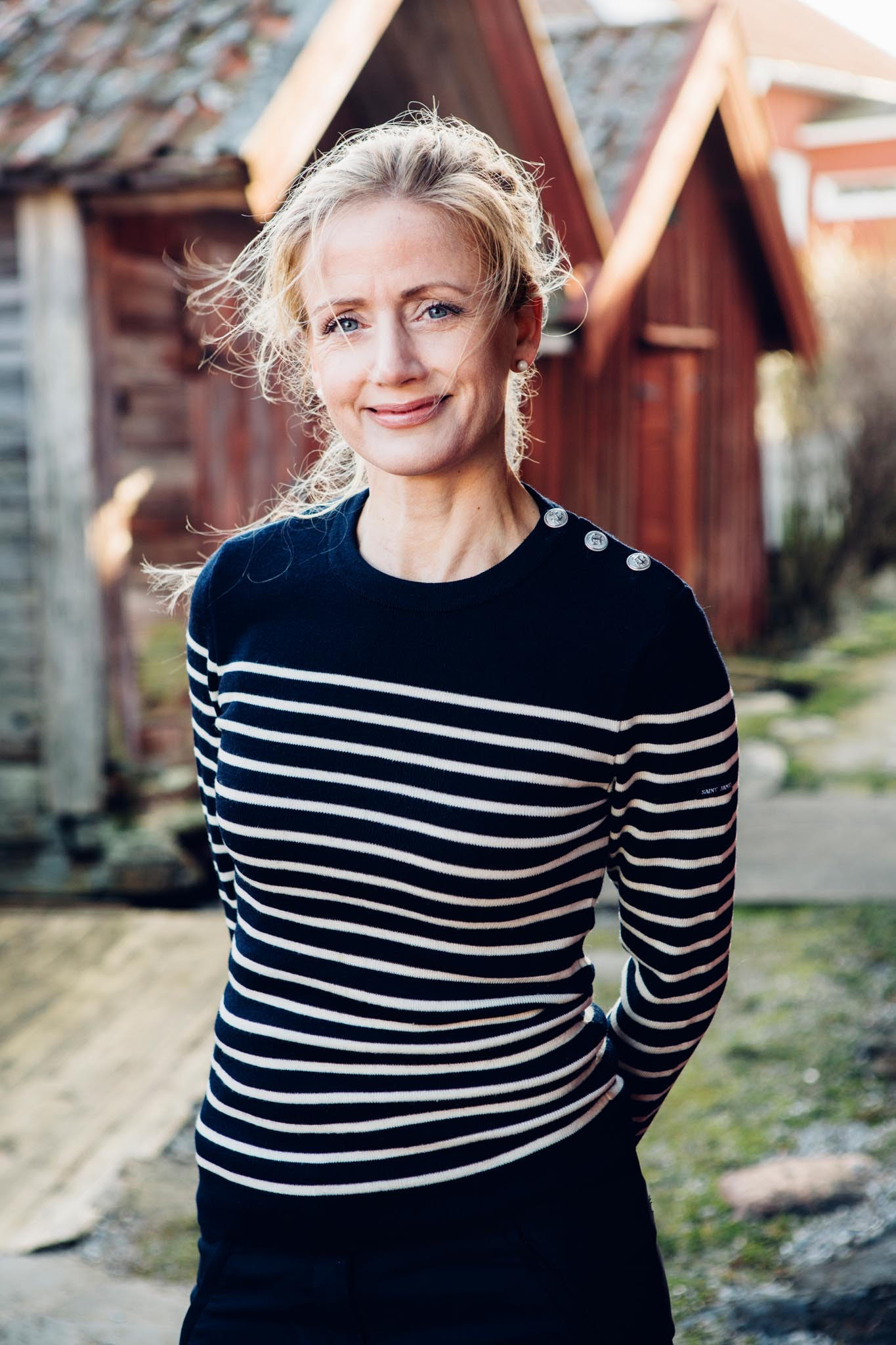
- Education: University of Gothenburg (PhD)
- Occupation: Diplomat
- Employer: Ministry for Foreign Affairs (Sweden)
- Known for: Sweden's Ambassador for Corporate Social Responsibility and Ambassador for Ocean, Seas and Fresh Water

Lisa Emelia Svensson is a Swedish diplomat. She was Sweden's Ambassador for Corporate social responsibility from 2010 and its Ambassador for Ocean, Seas and Fresh Water from 2012, and from 2016 led the ocean and marine programme of the United Nations Environment Programme (UNEP) in Nairobi. Since 2025 she has been Minister Counsellor at the Permanent Mission of Sweden to the United Nations in Geneva.

== Early life and education ==
Svensson grew up in Bohuslän, on Sweden's west coast. She attended LM Engström Gymnasium before studying at the School of Business, Economics and Law at the University of Gothenburg, where she earned a Master of Science in political economy. In 2008 she completed a PhD in political economy at the same institution with the dissertation Normerande idéparadox, on innovation policy and government strategies for economic growth.

== Career ==
Svensson began her career at Göteborg & Co in 1997 and later worked for the Swedish Trade Council (now Business Sweden) in New York. She joined Sweden's diplomatic service in 2002 and was posted to the Swedish Embassy in Washington, D.C., as trade attaché in 2004. She was then a diplomat-in-residence at the Center for Transatlantic Relations of the Johns Hopkins University School of Advanced International Studies, where she wrote Combating Climate Change: A Transatlantic Approach to Common Solutions (2008).

From 2008 she worked at the European Commission as a seconded national expert on trade, negotiating trade and sustainable development chapters in EU agreements, including with Singapore and with African, Caribbean and Pacific states.

In 2010 she was appointed Sweden's Ambassador for Corporate Social Responsibility, based in the trade policy department of the Ministry for Foreign Affairs. She was Sweden's chief negotiator in the 2011 revision of the OECD Guidelines for Multinational Enterprises, and served on the board of the Global Reporting Initiative and the advisory board of the United Nations Global Compact. In 2012 she became Ambassador for Ocean, Seas and Fresh Water at the Ministry of the Environment, and took part in Sweden's preparations for the 2017 UN Ocean Conference, which Sweden co-hosted with Fiji. She was one of the first diplomats appointed specifically to ocean affairs, and took part in the negotiations that led to Sustainable Development Goal 14 on life below water.

In 2016 she joined UNEP in Nairobi to lead its ocean and marine programme. In that role she spoke for UNEP on marine plastic pollution, which she described in 2017 as "a planetary crisis".

She returned to the Swedish Ministry for Foreign Affairs in 2021 and from 2023 worked as an adviser on global cybersecurity and digital affairs. In 2025 she was appointed Minister Counsellor at Sweden's Permanent Mission in Geneva, where she works on governance, oversight and reform of the United Nations system.

In January 2026, the documents were released by the United States Department of Justice as part of the Epstein files, which also included correspondence between Svensson and Jeffrey Epstein in 2010-2019. According to SVT, the emails showed that she had twice stayed in Epstein's apartment in Manhattan, in 2012 and 2015. Svensson confirmed this and said that she distanced herself from Epstein and his actions. The Ministry for Foreign Affairs said that, as it understood the matter, the contacts had not been related to her work at the ministry.

== Publications ==
- Svensson, Lisa Emelia (2008). Normerande idéparadox (PhD thesis) (in Swedish). University of Gothenburg.
- Svensson, Lisa Emelia (2008). Combating Climate Change: A Transatlantic Approach to Common Solutions. Center for Transatlantic Relations, Johns Hopkins University SAIS. ISBN 978-0-9801871-1-3.
