= Rabbalshede =

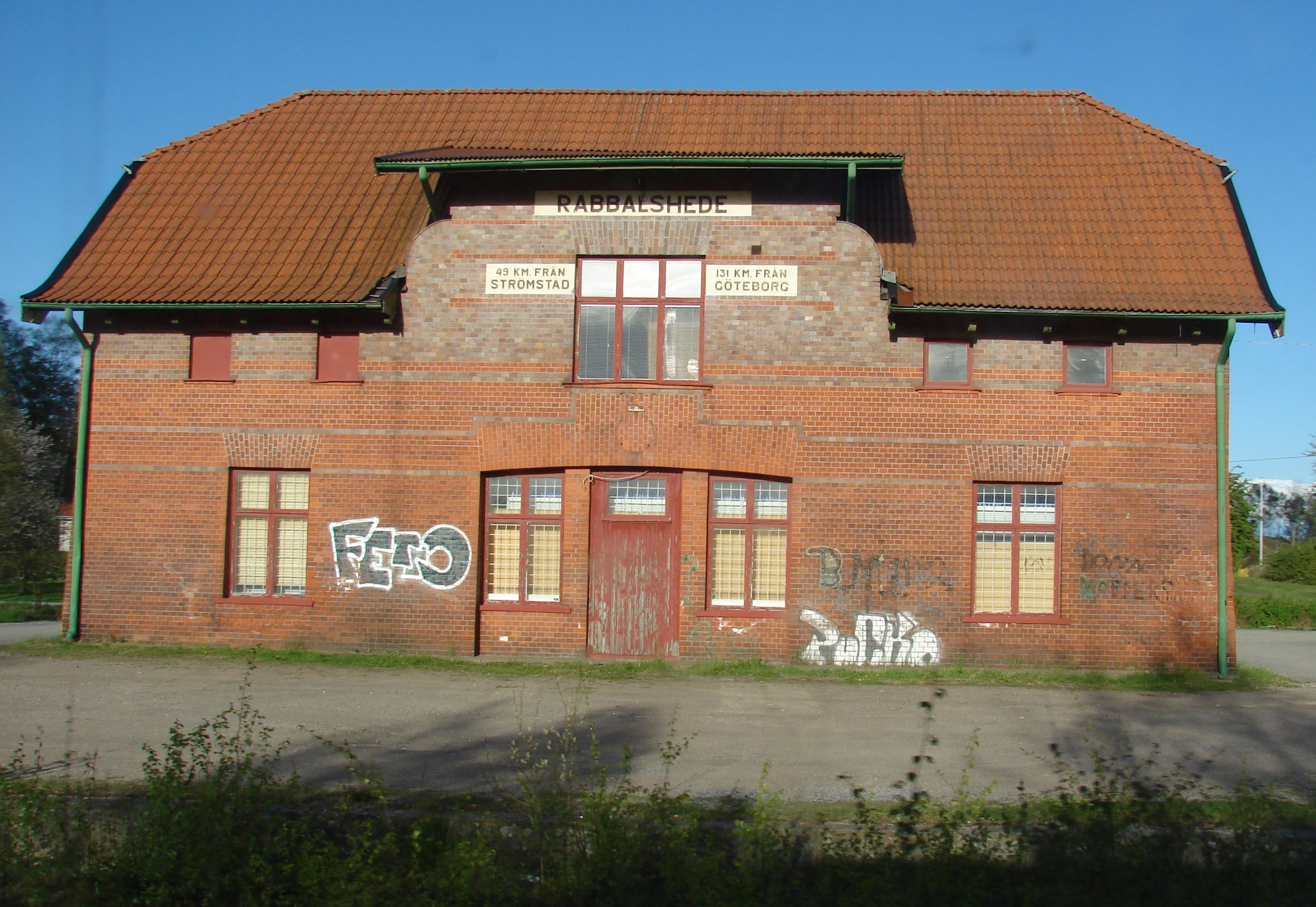
- Rabbalshede station

- Location within Västra Götaland Location within Sweden
- Coordinates: 58°37′N 11°28′E
- Country: Sweden
- Province: Bohuslän
- County: Västra Götaland County
- Municipality: Tanum Municipality

Area
  - Total: 0.58 km^{2} (0.22 sq mi)

Population (31 December 2010)
  - Total: 275
  - Density: 471/km^{2} (1,220/sq mi)
- Time zone: UTC+1 (CET)
  - Summer (DST): UTC+2 (CEST)

Rabbalshede is a locality situated in Tanum Municipality, Västra Götaland County, Sweden with 275 inhabitants in 2010.
