= Rock Carvings in Tanum =

UNESCO World Heritage Site
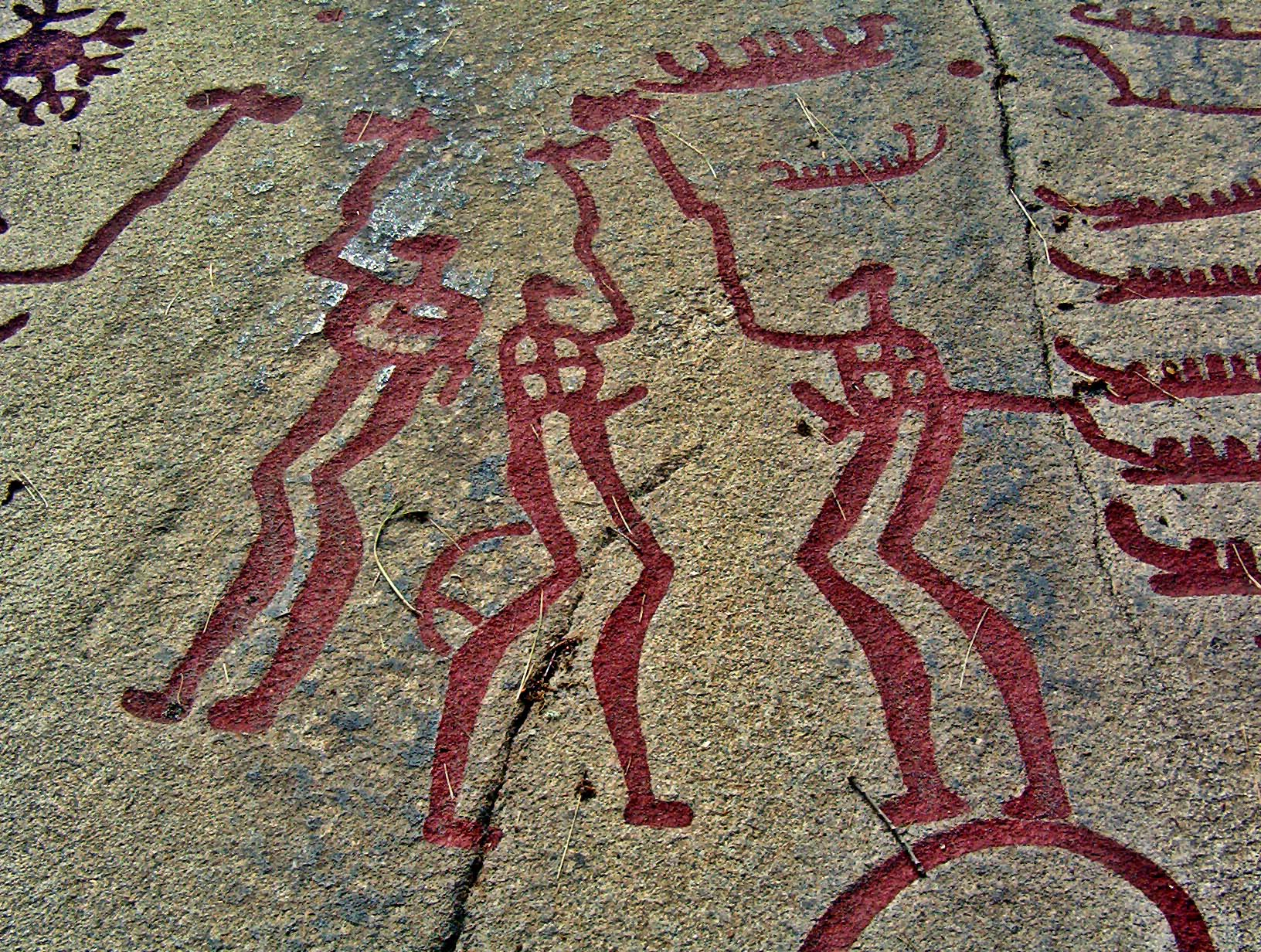
- Three men in a ritual

- Location within Västra Götaland Location within Sweden
- Location: Tanumshede, Tanum Municipality, Västra Götaland County, Sweden
- Criteria: Cultural: (i), (iii), (iv)
- Reference: 557rev
- Inscription: 1994 (18th Session)
- Area: 4,137.609 ha (10,224.25 acres)
- Coordinates: 58°42′4″N 11°20′28″E

The Rock Carvings in Tanum (Swedish: Hällristningsområdet i Tanum) are a collection of petroglyphs near Tanumshede, Bohuslän, Sweden, which were declared a World Heritage Site by UNESCO in 1994 because of their high concentration.

== Petroglyphs ==
In total, there are thousands of images called the Tanum petroglyphs, on about 600 panels within the World Heritage Area. These are concentrated in distinct areas along a 25 km stretch, and covers an area of about 51 hectares (126 acres or 0.5 km^{2}).

While the region was on the coastline when the drawings were made, it is now at an elevation of 25 m.

Scandinavian Bronze Age and Iron Age people were sophisticated craftsmen and very competent travelers by water. (Dates for ages vary with the region; in Scandinavia, the Bronze Age is roughly 1800 to 500 BC.) Many of the glyphs depict boats of which some seem to be of the Hjortspring boat type carrying around a dozen passengers. Wagons or carts are also depicted.

Other glyphs depict humans with a bow, spear or axe, and others depict hunting scenes. In all cases the pictures show people performing rituals. There is a human at a plough drawn by two oxen, holding what might be a branch or an ox-goading crop made of a number of strips of hide.

One of the larger rocks of Nordic Bronze Age petroglyphs in Scandinavia (at 22 metres tall and 6 metres wide), the Vitlyckehäll, is located in Tanumshede. It contains nearly 300 carvings of a variety of scenes, people, and objects.

The rock carvings are endangered by erosion due to acid rain and some are thus covered either permanently or during certain times of the year. Some have been painted red to make them more visible for tourists; a practice which has drawn criticism for removing the authenticity and original state of the drawings.

== Recent history ==
The first records of the images inscribed at the site were made in 1627 when Peder Alfsön, a Norwegian doctor and lector, made ink drawings of some of the carvings. The first professional recordings were made in 1792 by Carl Gustaf Gottfried Hilfeling, who was sent by nobleman Pehr Tham to draw the carvings. A number of excavations and recordings took place over the course of the early 19th century, primarily led by Carl Georg Brunius and Axel Emmanuel Holmberg, who published research and debated at length the most likely era of their creation. Strong arguments for the now accepted era were not made until the late 19th century, when Oscar Montelius and Viktor Rydberg presented evidence linking the drawings to the Bronze Age. During the early 20th century, studies began to focus more on the meaning behind the drawings, rather than determining their age, but late 20th century work confirmed that the drawings were likely made during the Bronze Age.

The site was named a World Heritage Site by UNESCO in 1994; encompassing approximately 45 km^{2} in total. It is visited by approximately 100,000 people per year, though visitors are not permitted to walk on or touch the drawings.

== Gallery ==
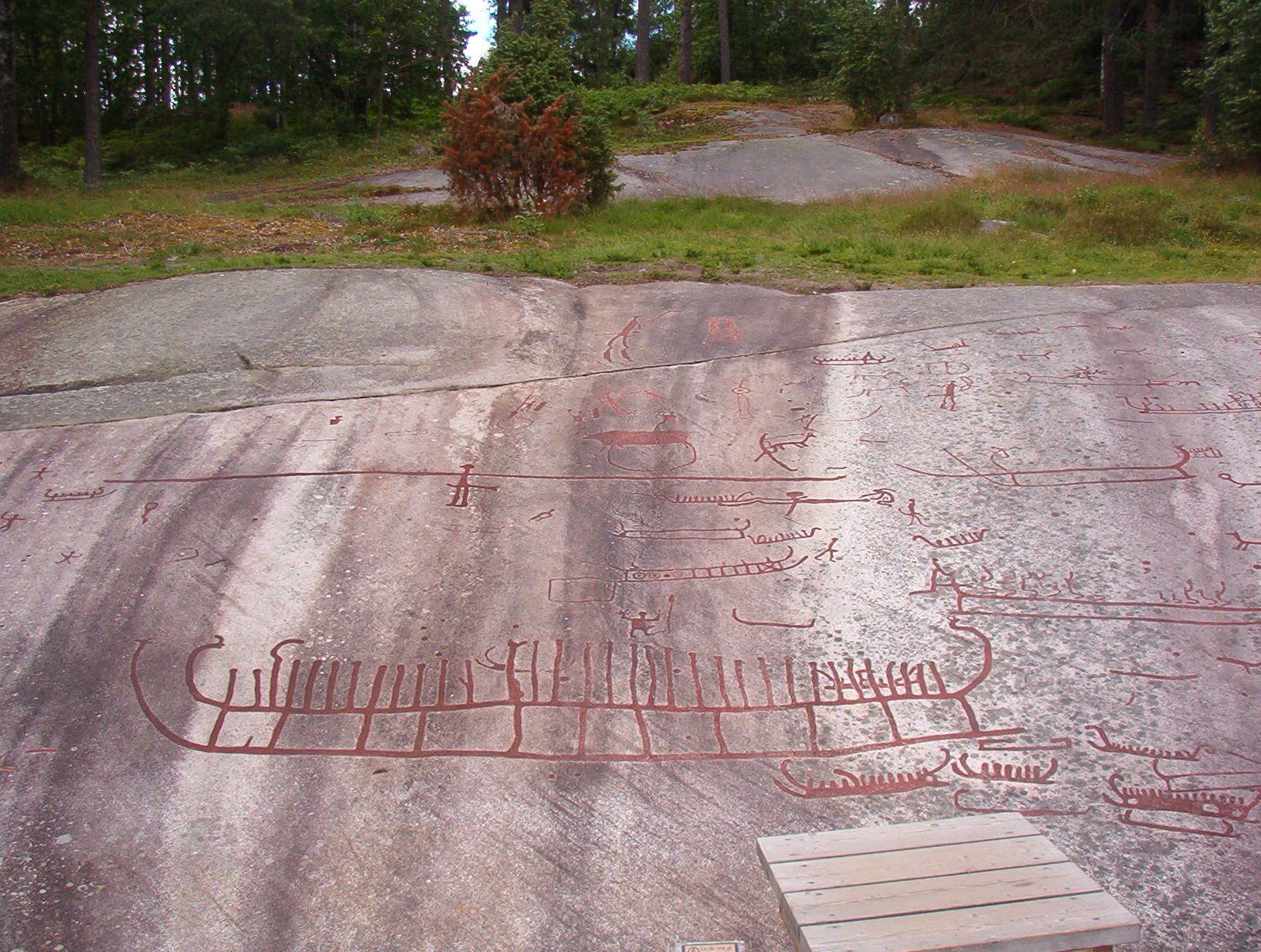
The Vitlycke flat rock

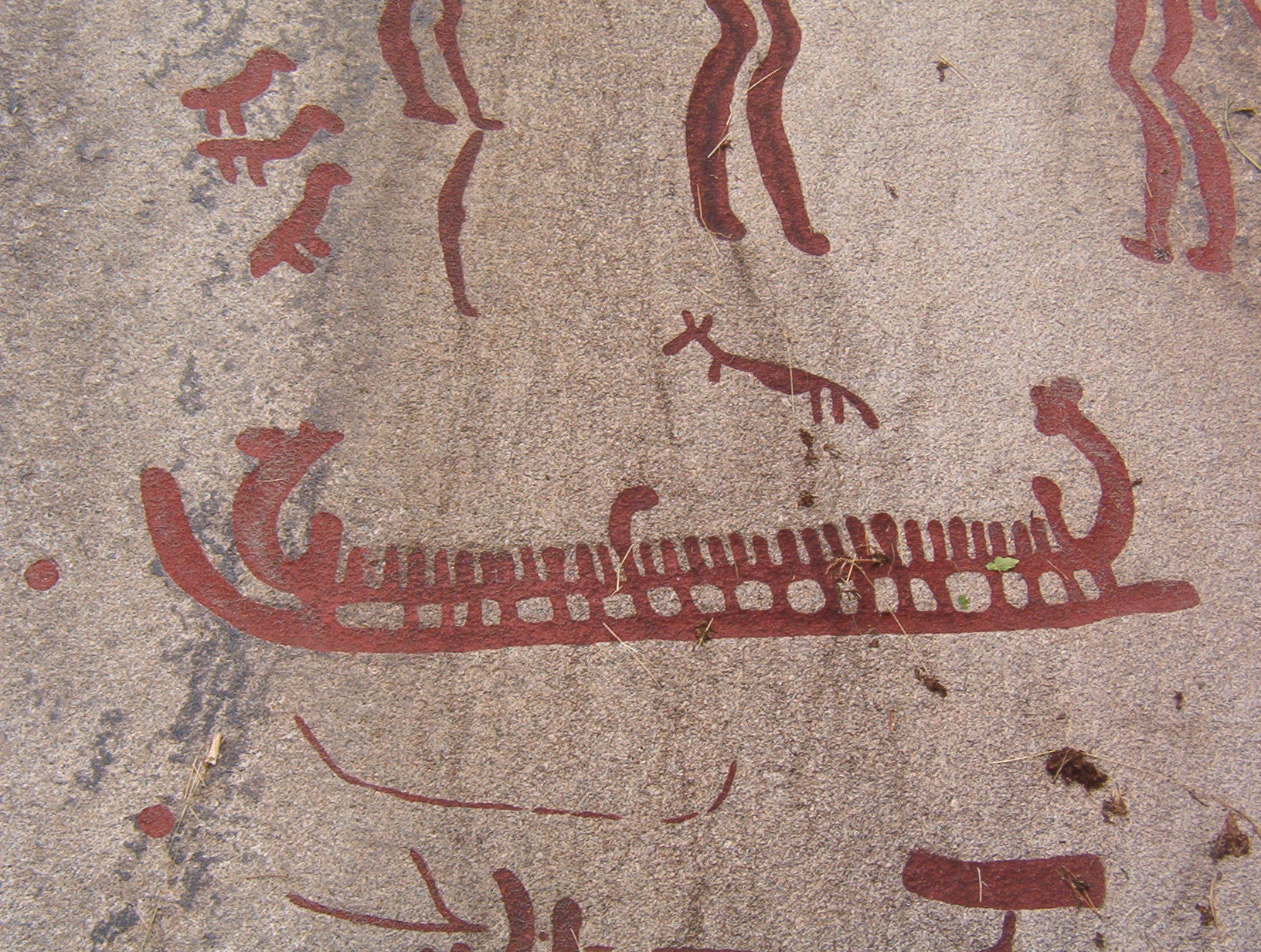
Ship, animal

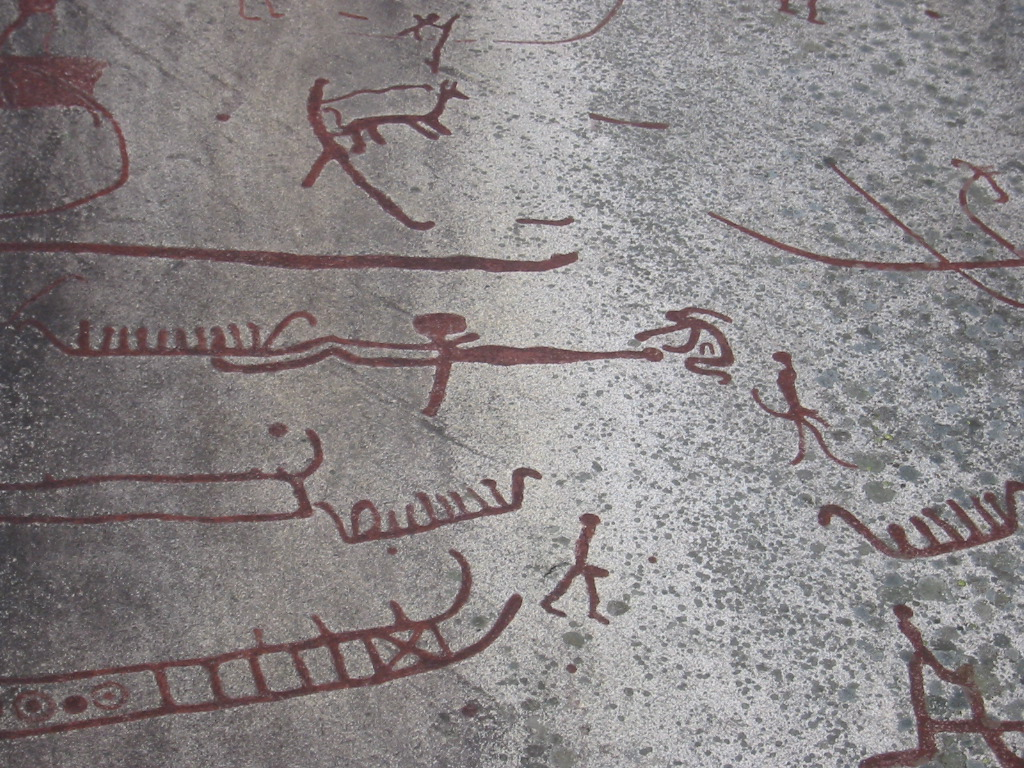
The Grieving Woman

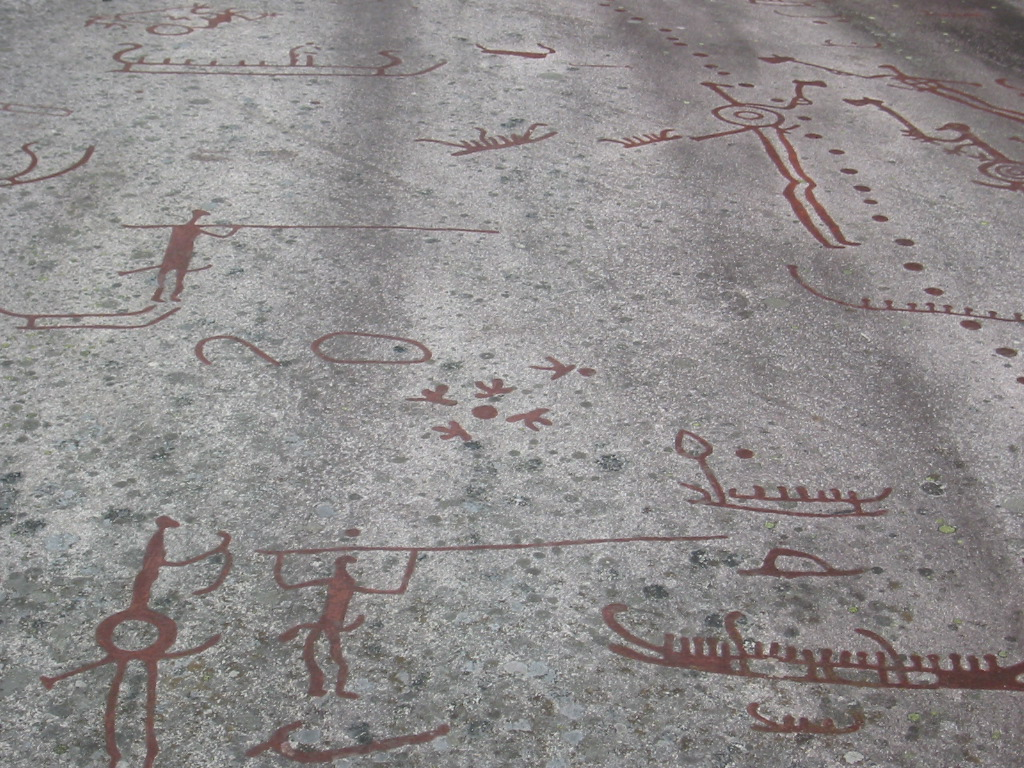
Birds

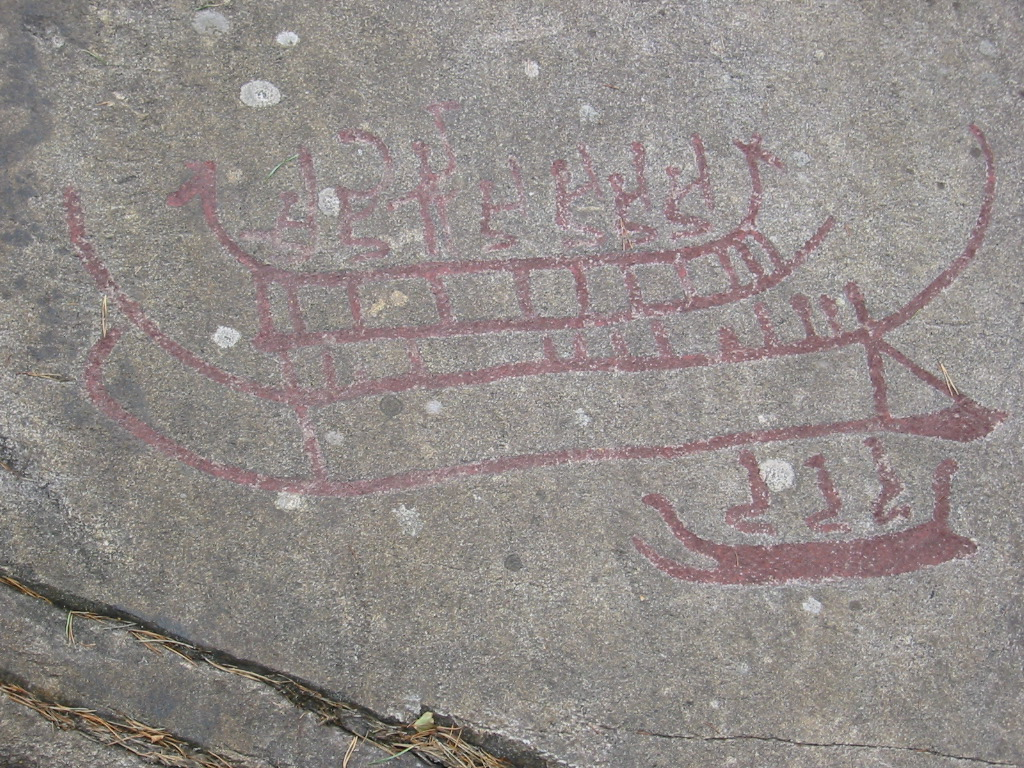
Boat

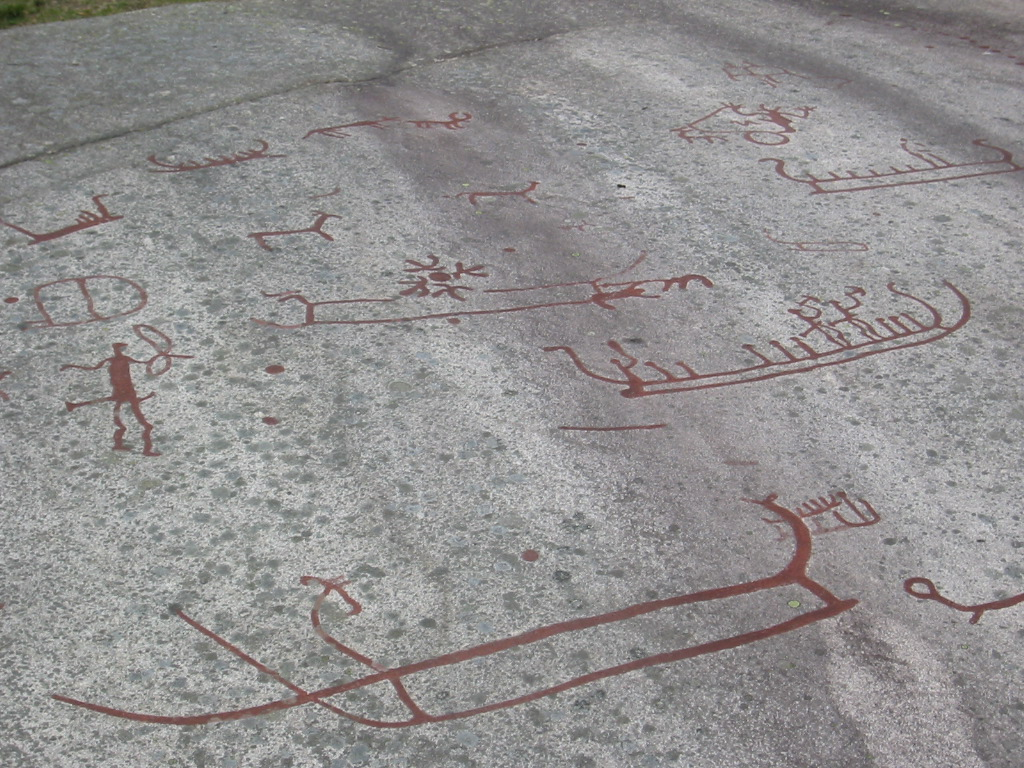
Chariot

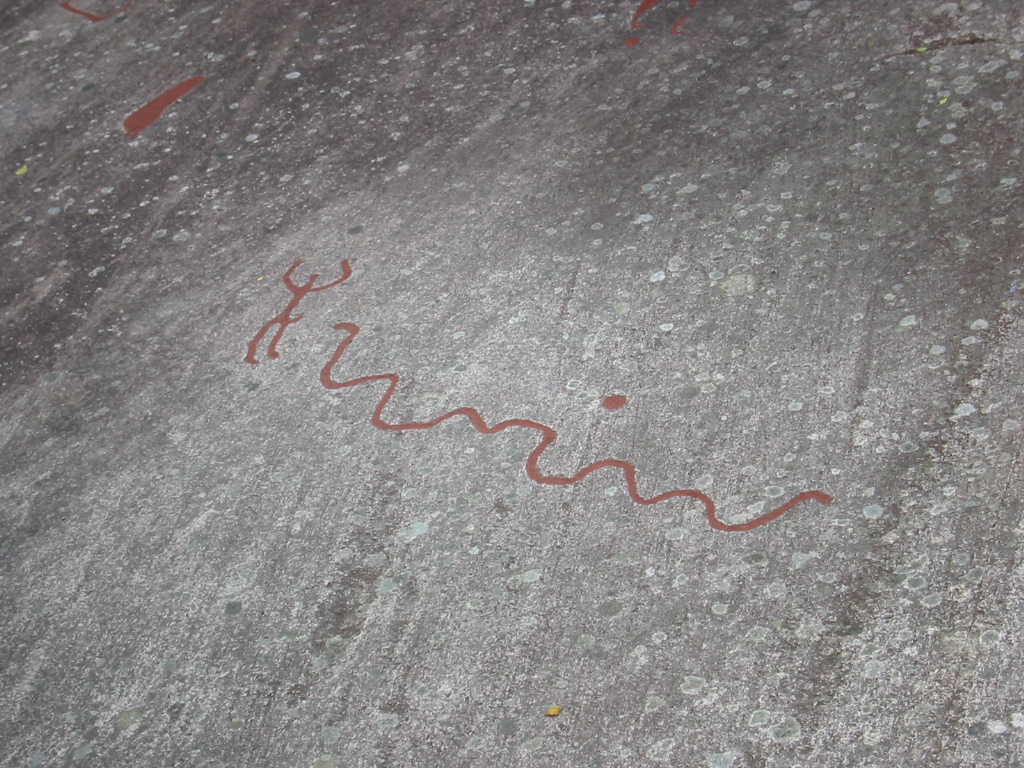
The Snake

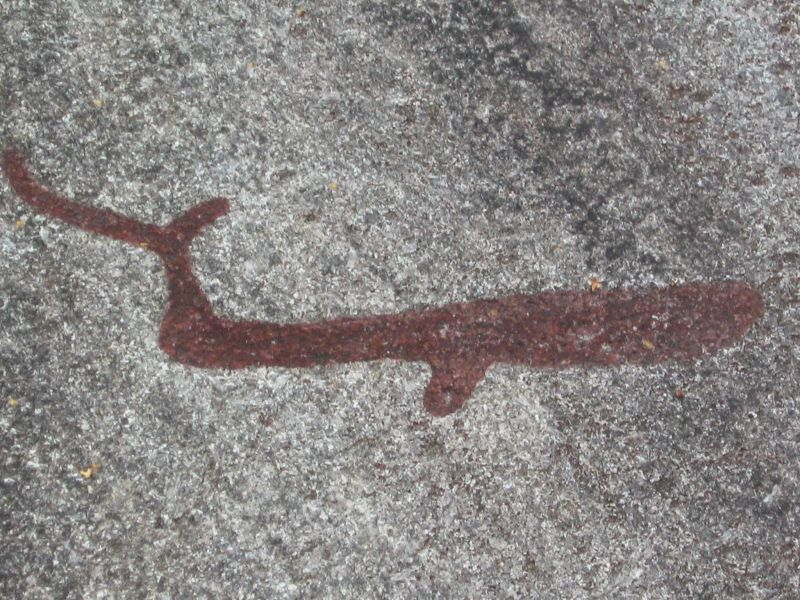
Whale

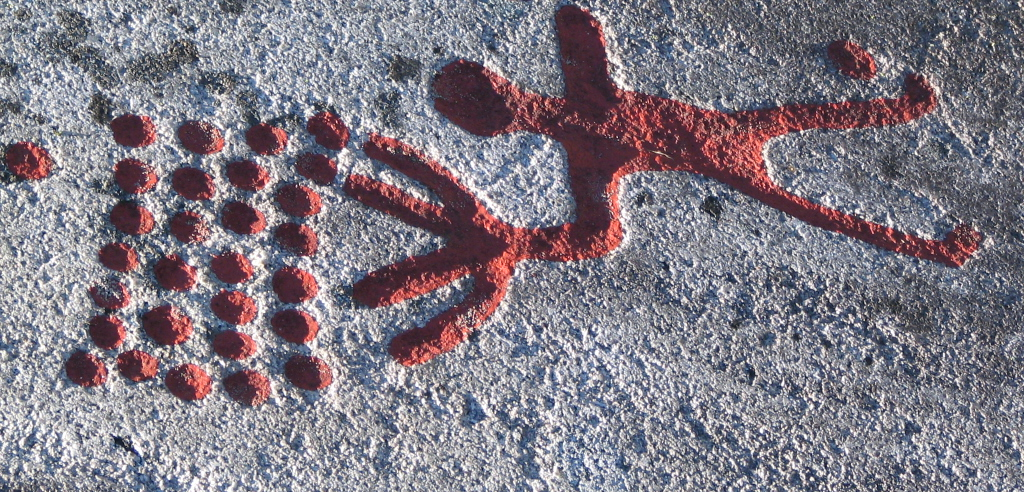
29 balls in evening sunlight

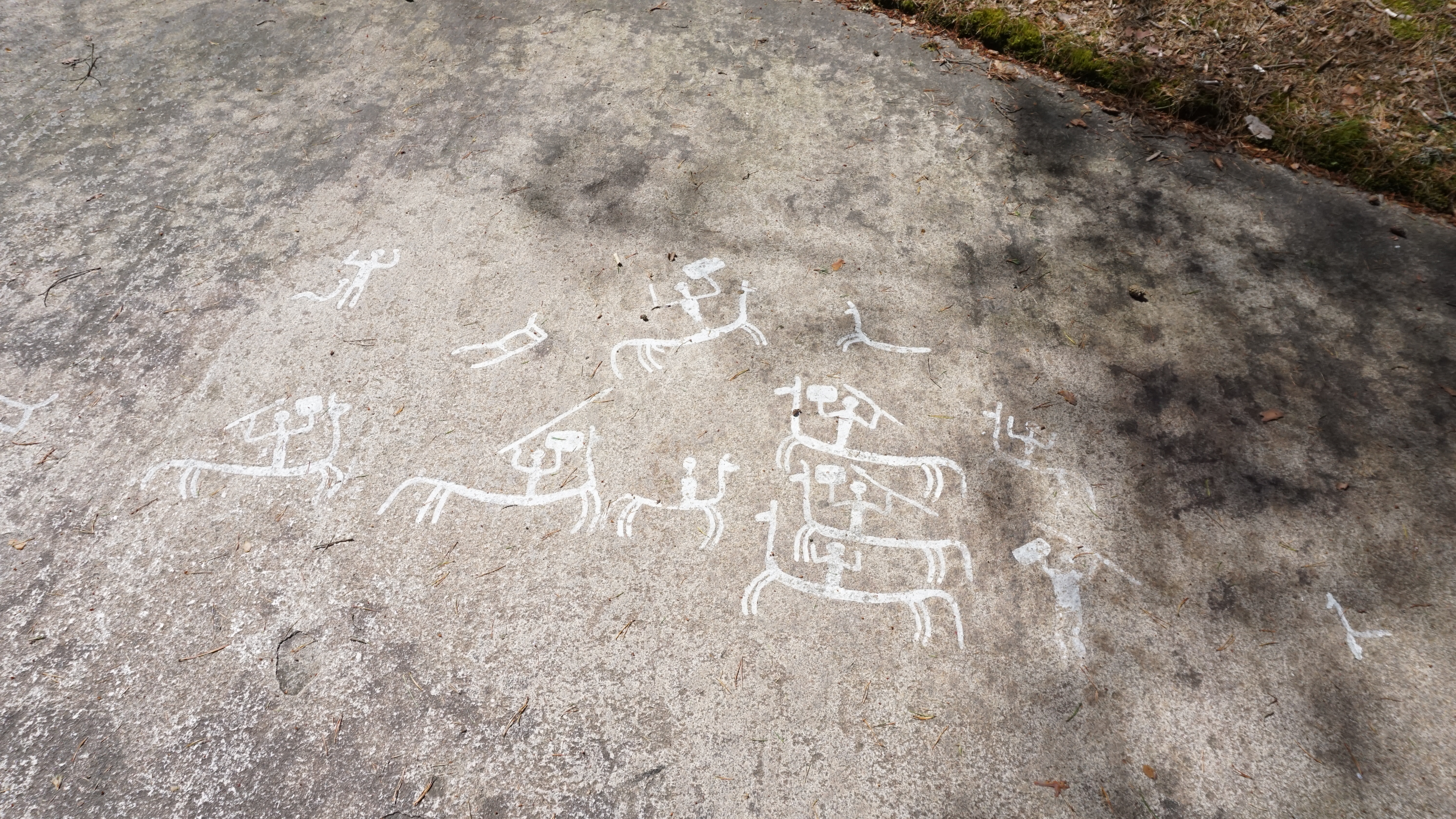
Carvings featuring horse riders at Litselby
