= Dyngö =

Coordinates: 58°35′13″N 11°13′33″E

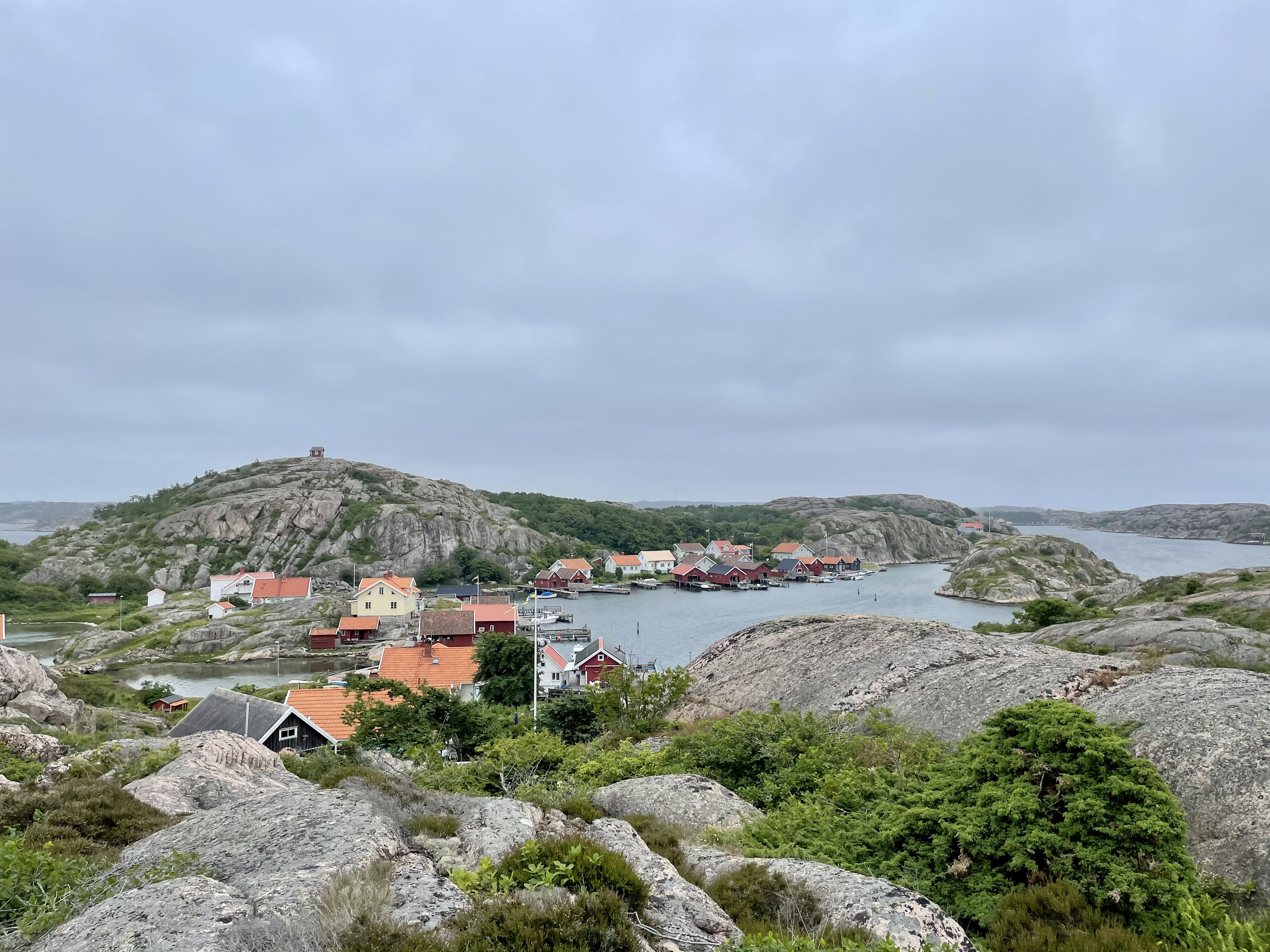

Dyngö is a small island in the archipelago of Sweden's west coast, located in the province (landskap) of Bohuslän, near the village Fjällbacka. Formerly a fishing community, the island now has few or no permanent inhabitants, hosting instead a number of summer residents. In the 1950s one prominent summer resident was Per Nyström, the then county governor of the provinces of Bohuslän and Gothenburg.
