= Bullaren =

Area in Sweden

- Location within Sweden
- Location: Bohuslän, West Sweden
- Coordinates: 58°43′N 11°34′E
- Basin countries: Sweden

Bullarebygden is the name of the area surrounding three connected lakes in Bohuslän in the southwestern part of Sweden. Another commonly used name for the same area is Bullaren.

== Lay out ==
The landscape is a mixture of forests and meadows. Less than 2,000 people populate the rural area and by tradition, farming is still common. Both the national highway Enningdal River run through Bullaren. Moose hunting and fishing are popular activities, both by people living there and by visitors.

== Bullingrutten ==
Bullaren is known for the annual bicycle race called "Bullingrutten" which is much like a huge feast for the locals, since no one is actually trying to win the actual race. The race takes the competitors around the center lake, while nature brings beautiful views. Other events that take place are the annual market, as well as a live show made by "Bullingen Jär´et igen" at the local rustic site.

== See also ==
- Bullaren Hundred
