= Grebbestad =

- Locality
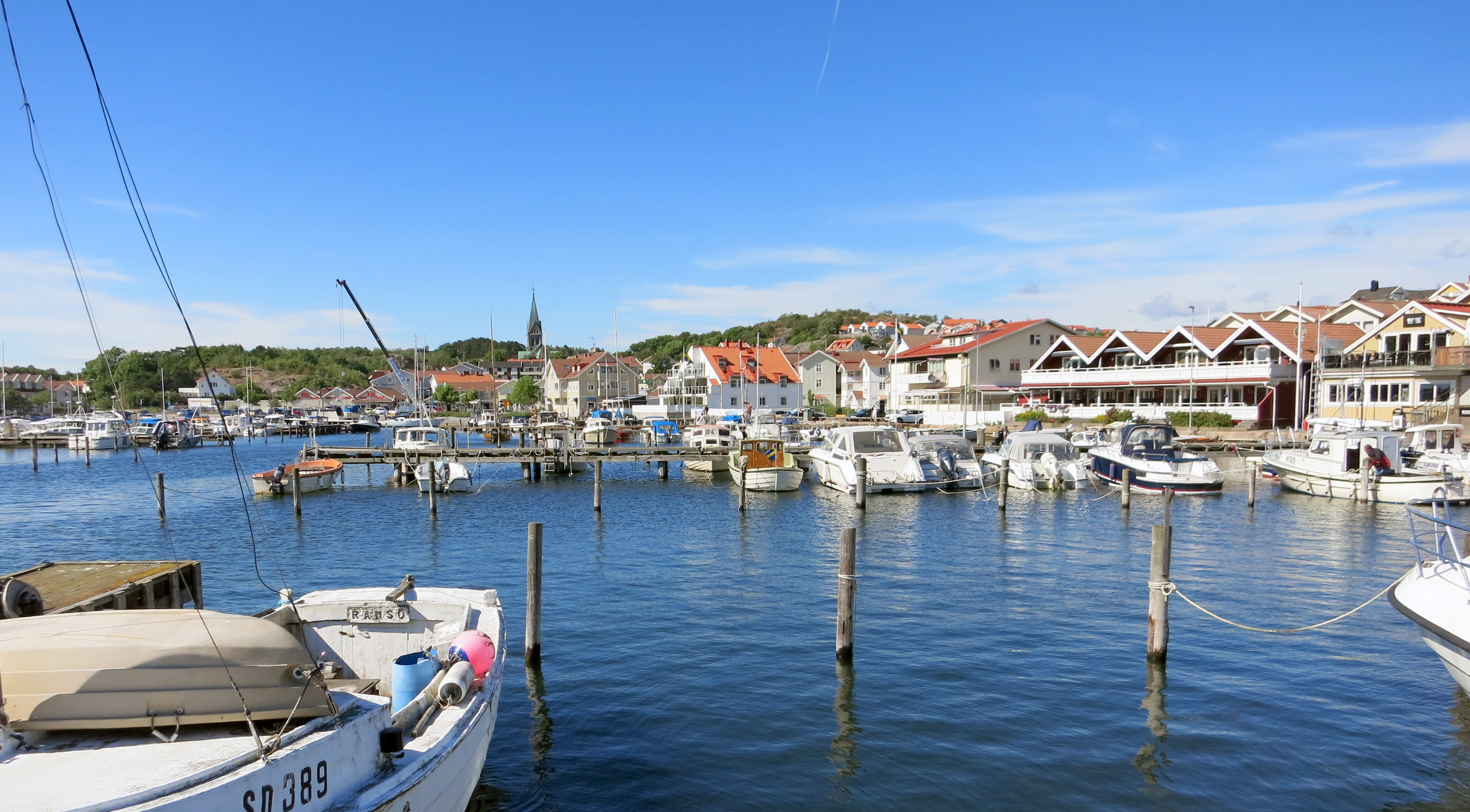
- View of Grebbestad

- Location within Västra Götaland Location within Sweden
- Coordinates: 58°42′N 11°15′E
- Country: Sweden
- Province: Bohuslän
- County: Västra Götaland County
- Municipality: Tanum Municipality

Area
  - Total: 1.20 km^{2} (0.46 sq mi)

Population (31 December 2010)
  - Total: 1,401
  - Density: 1,164/km^{2} (3,010/sq mi)
- Time zone: UTC+1 (CET)
  - Summer (DST): UTC+2 (CEST)

Grebbestad (Swedish pronunciation: [ˈɡrɛ̂bːɛsta(d)]) is a locality situated in Tanum Municipality, Västra Götaland County, Sweden. As of 2010, there were 1,401 inhabitants, though this number can increase by as much as ten-fold during the summer. The town is also the harbour where the majority of Norway lobster (in Swedish havskräfta) are landed, as well as oysters.

== Sports ==
The following sports clubs are located in Grebbestad:

- Grebbestads IF

== See also ==
- Greby
