= Bohuslän =

Historical province of Sweden

- Historical province
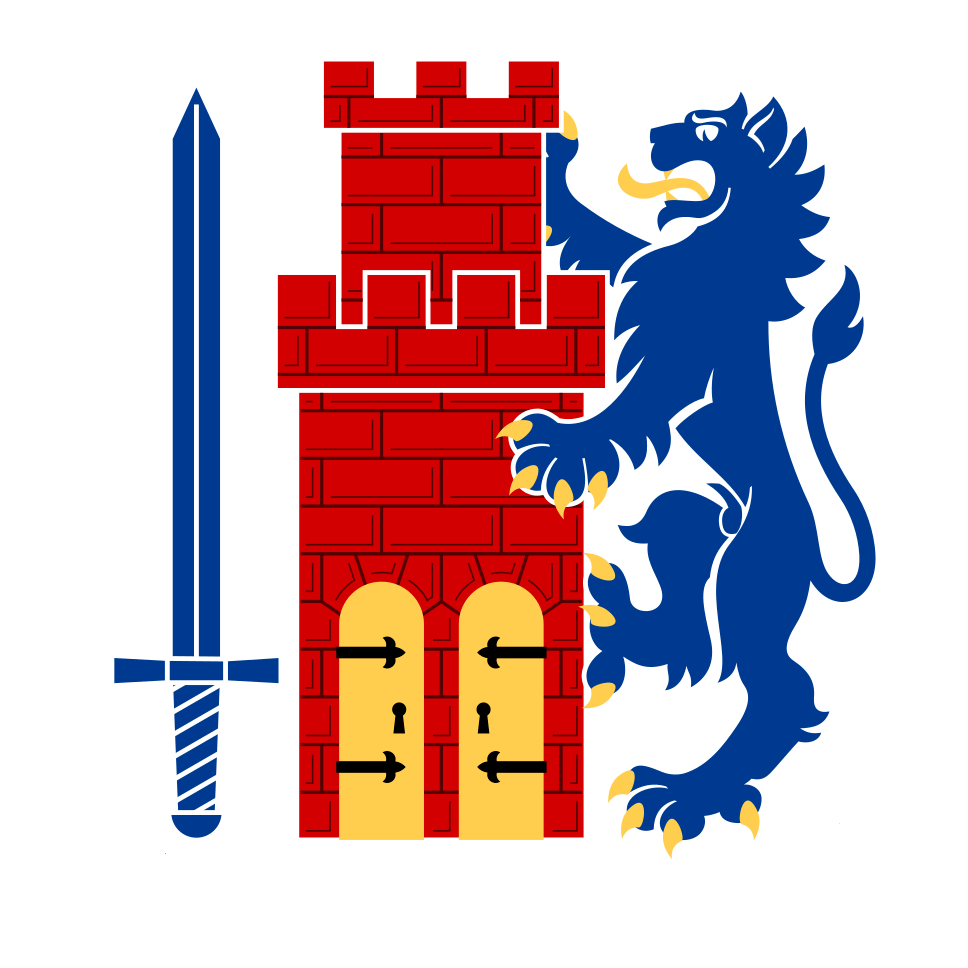
- Flag Coat of arms

- Coordinates: 58°14′53″N 11°53′13″E
- Country: Sweden
- Land: Götaland
- County: Västra Götaland County

Area
  - Total: 4,400 km^{2} (1,700 sq mi)

Population (31 December 2023)
  - Total: 315,240
  - Density: 72/km^{2} (190/sq mi)

Ethnicity
  - Language: Swedish
  - Dialect: Götamål

Culture
  - Flower: European honeysuckle
  - Animal: Harbour seal
  - Bird: Eurasian oystercatcher
  - Fish: Mackerel
- Time zone: UTC+1 (CET)
  - Summer (DST): UTC+2 (CEST)

Bohuslän (Swedish pronunciation: [ˈbûːhʉːsˌlɛːn]) is a Swedish province in Götaland, on the northernmost part of the country's west coast. It is bordered by Dalsland to the northeast, Västergötland to the southeast, the Skagerrak arm of the North Sea to the west, and the county of Østfold, in Norway, to the north. In English it literally means Bohus County, although it shared counties with the city of Gothenburg prior to the 1998 county merger and thus was not an administrative unit in its own right.

Bohuslän is named after the medieval Norwegian castle of Bohus (Norwegian: Båhus). Under the name Båhuslen (Bohuslen in Danish), it was a Norwegian county from the Norwegian conquest of the region from the Geats and subsequent unification of the country in the 870s until the Treaty of Roskilde in 1658, when the union of Denmark–Norway was forced to cede this county, as well as Skåneland (part of Denmark proper), to Sweden.

As of 31 December 2016, the number of inhabitants was 299,087, giving a population density of 68 inhabitants per square kilometre (180/sq mi).

== Administration ==
The provinces of Sweden serve no administrative function. That function is served by the counties of Sweden instead. For centuries, the administrative county for Bohuslän was Gothenburg and Bohus County, and, as its name implies, it consisted of the entire Bohuslän province together with the city Gothenburg. In 1998, some Swedish counties were merged to reduce administration costs. Gothenburg and Bohus County were merged into the new, much larger Västra Götaland County.

== Heraldry ==
Bohuslän was granted its arms at the time of the funeral for Charles X Gustav of Sweden in 1660. It was identical to the arms of the town of Kungälv. In 1962 the higher claim of the town was established and a variation for the arms of the county was introduced. The coat of arms is surmounted by a ducal coronet. Blazon: 'Argent, a Castle embattled Gules with one embattled Tower of the same and two doors Or hinged Sable between a Sword point upwards and Lion rampant holding the Tower both Azure langued and armed Or."

== Geography ==
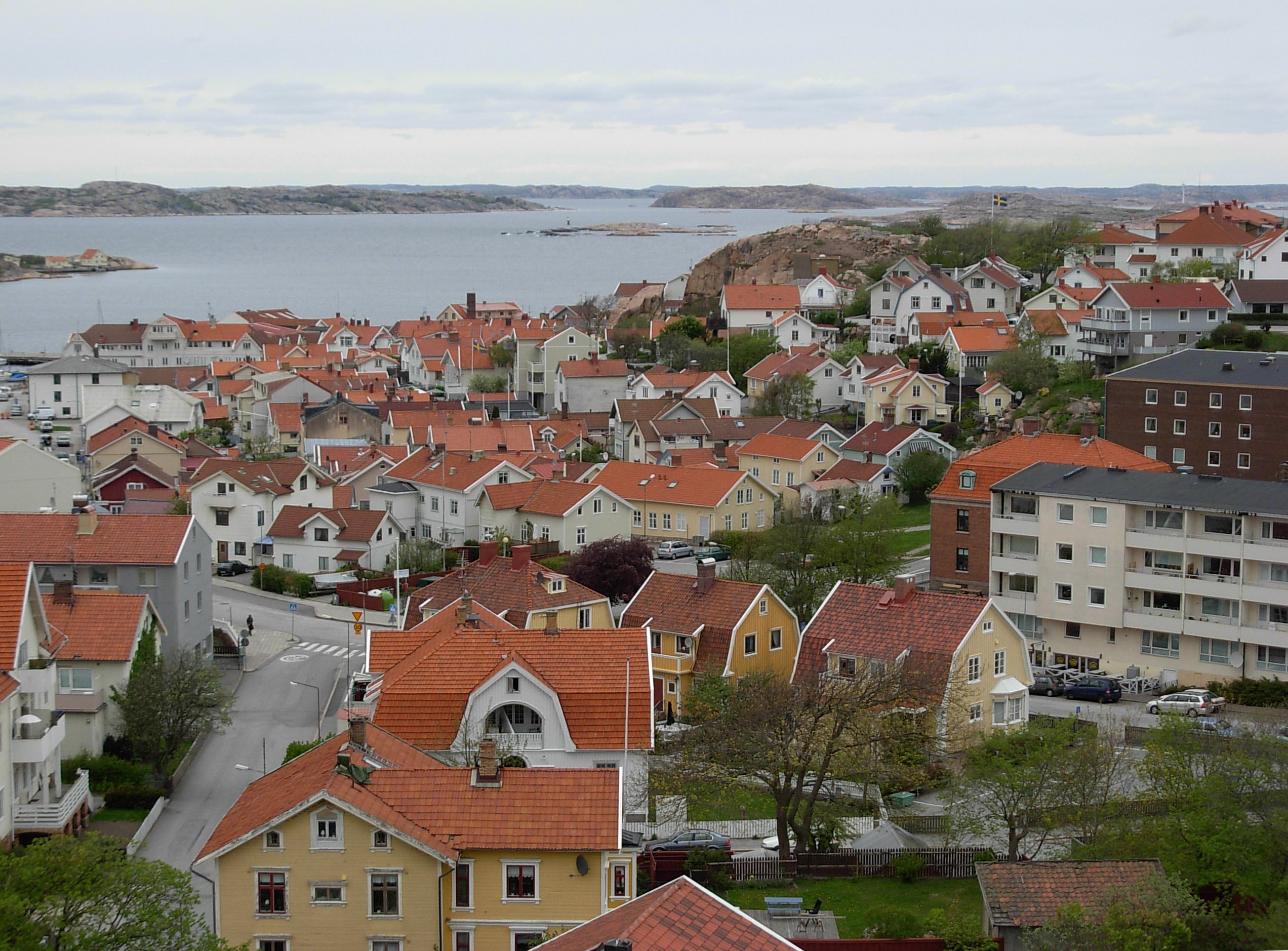
Lysekil, an old fishing village in Bohuslän

Bohuslän is distinguished by its rocky coast bordering an archipelago: there are about 3,000 islands and 5,000 islets (skerries). These make up the northern part of the Gothenburg archipelago, Sweden's second largest after Stockholm archipelago. In the past, the seascape was renowned for its many reefs and sunken rocks which caused many shipwrecks. Two of the largest islands, Orust and Tjörn, are their own municipalities. Both islands have a distinct culture and history. The highest point is Björnepiken at 222 meters.

Sweden's only threshold fjord, Gullmarn or Gullmarsfjorden, is located near Lysekil. It is 25 kilometres (16 mi) long and 1 to 3 kilometres (0.62 to 1.86 mi) wide with a maximum depth of 118.5 metres (389 ft). The fjord is home to unique marine life.

Bohuslän's coastline was ranked 7th among the world's last great wilderness areas by CNN Travel.

Unlike other parts of Sweden, there are relatively few lakes or streams in Bohuslän: out of a total land area of 4,500 square kilometres (1,700 sq mi) freshwater covers only 177 square kilometres (68 sq mi). Although lakes are common, they tend to be small in size. The largest lakes are the northern and southern Bullaren lakes, with a combined area of about 40 square kilometres (15 sq mi).

=== Geology ===
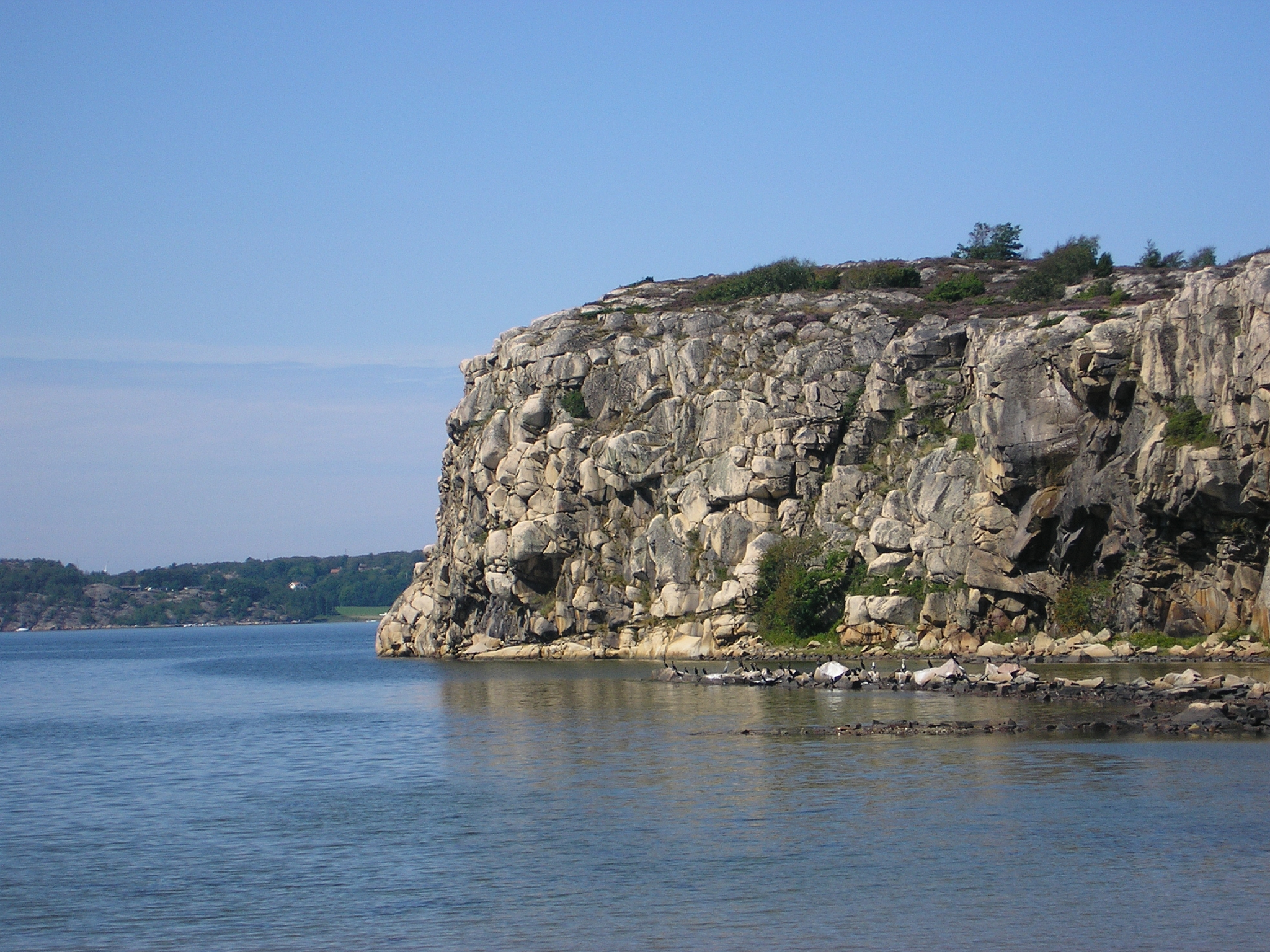
Urhultsberget in Lysekil Municipality

Most of the coast is made up by Bohus granite formed in the aftermath of the Sveconorwegian orogeny. In detail these granites have been eroded as to contain abundant small rock basins, some of them filled with clay and silt of combined glacial and marine origin.

The coast of Bohuslän is a joint valley landscape. Studies of denudation chronology suggest Bohuslän lies at the westernmost reaches of the Sub-Cambrian peneplain; however, there is some uncerntainty on whether the hilltops are remnants of the peneplain. Rather than Sub-cambrian most of the province is made up of a relief unit known as the Sub-Mesozoic hilly peneplain.

=== Islands ===
- Björkö
- Bohus Malmön
- Brattön
- Dyngö
- Dyrön
- Fotö
- Grötö
- Gullholmen
- Hamburgö
- Hisingen (partly)
- Härmanö
- Hyppeln
- Hållö
- Hälsö
- Hönö
- Kalvsund
- Koster
- Klädesholmen
- Källö-Knippla
- Käringön
- Malmön
- Marstrand
- Orust
- Rörö
- Resö
- Stenungsön
- Tjörn
- Vinga
- Åstol
- Öckerö

=== Larger settlements ===
Bohuslän's chartered cities are:

- Kungälv (approximately 1100)
- Lysekil (1903)
- Marstrand (approximately 1200)
- Strömstad (1672)
- Uddevalla (1498)

Their central areas are now non-administrative urban areas.

In addition there are several other notable settlements:

- Andalen
- Brastad
- Björlanda
- Bullaren
- Fiskebäckskil
- Fjällbacka
- Grebbestad
- Gothenburg (the north-western part of the city lies on Hisingen, and most of this island is in Bohuslän)
- Hamburgsund
- Henån
- Herrestad
- Hjuvik
- Hunnebostrand
- Kungshamn
- Ljungskile
- Munkedal
- Rabbalshede
- Rönnäng
- Skärhamn
- Smögen
- Stenungsund
- Stora Höga
- Tanumshede
- Torslanda
- Öckerö

== History ==
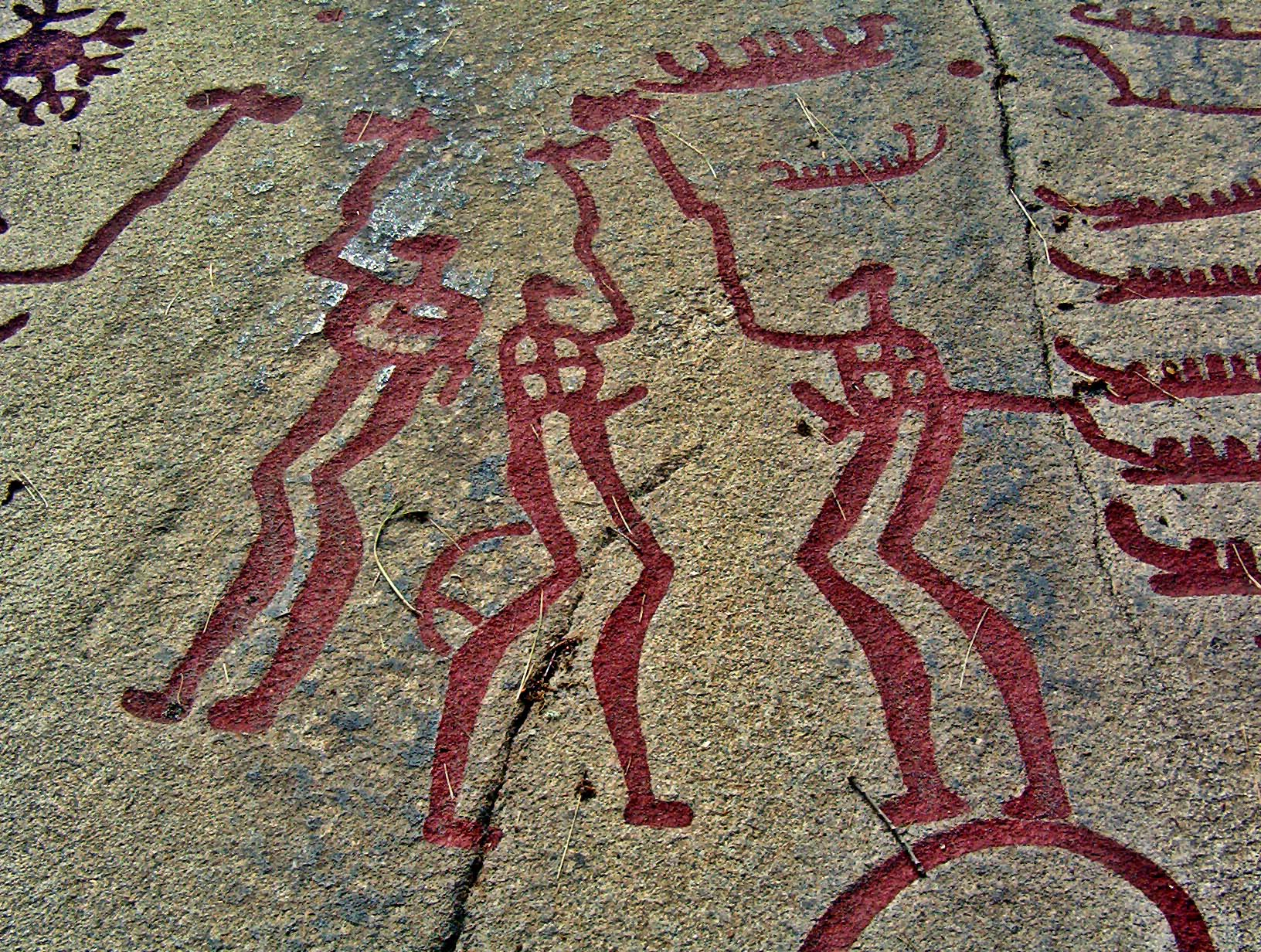
Nordic Bronze Age rock art in Bohuslän, Three men performing a ritual, circa 2nd millennium BCE, the Bronze Age.

During the 2nd millennium BCE, the Nordic Bronze Age began (c. 1700–500 BCE), including rock art such as the examples found throughout Bohuslän. During the Migration Period (300–700 CE) and the Viking Age (700–1000 CE), the area was part of Viken, and was actually known as two entities: Rånrike in the north and Elfsyssel in the south. It has been claimed that King Harald Fairhair made it part of a unified Norway in about 872, but contemporary sources give rise to doubt that Harald actually ever held the Viken area properly. The earliest attested information available of these lands being part of Norway is from the 11th century.

As long as Norway was a kingdom of its own, the province prospered, and the fortress of Båhus was one of the key defensive structures of the kingdom. When Norway was united with Denmark in 1537, the province began its decline in wealth as the area was frequently attacked by Swedish forces as part of larger border skirmishes. The fortress at Båhus, was improved to help protect this territory. Being a border zone with the Kingdom of Sweden, and to a lesser extent butting up against the province of Halland which at that time was part of Danish Scania, this caused the Båhus region to be disproportionately populated by soldier families.

The province of Bohuslän (Båhuslen) belonged to Denmark-Norway until it was ceded to Sweden in the Treaty of Roskilde, signed between the two countries in 1658. The fortress of Carlsten was built in Marstrand during the 17th century. For a period, Marstrand was also a free port (porto Franco), with free religious practice and, as such, home to the only synagogue in Sweden at the time.

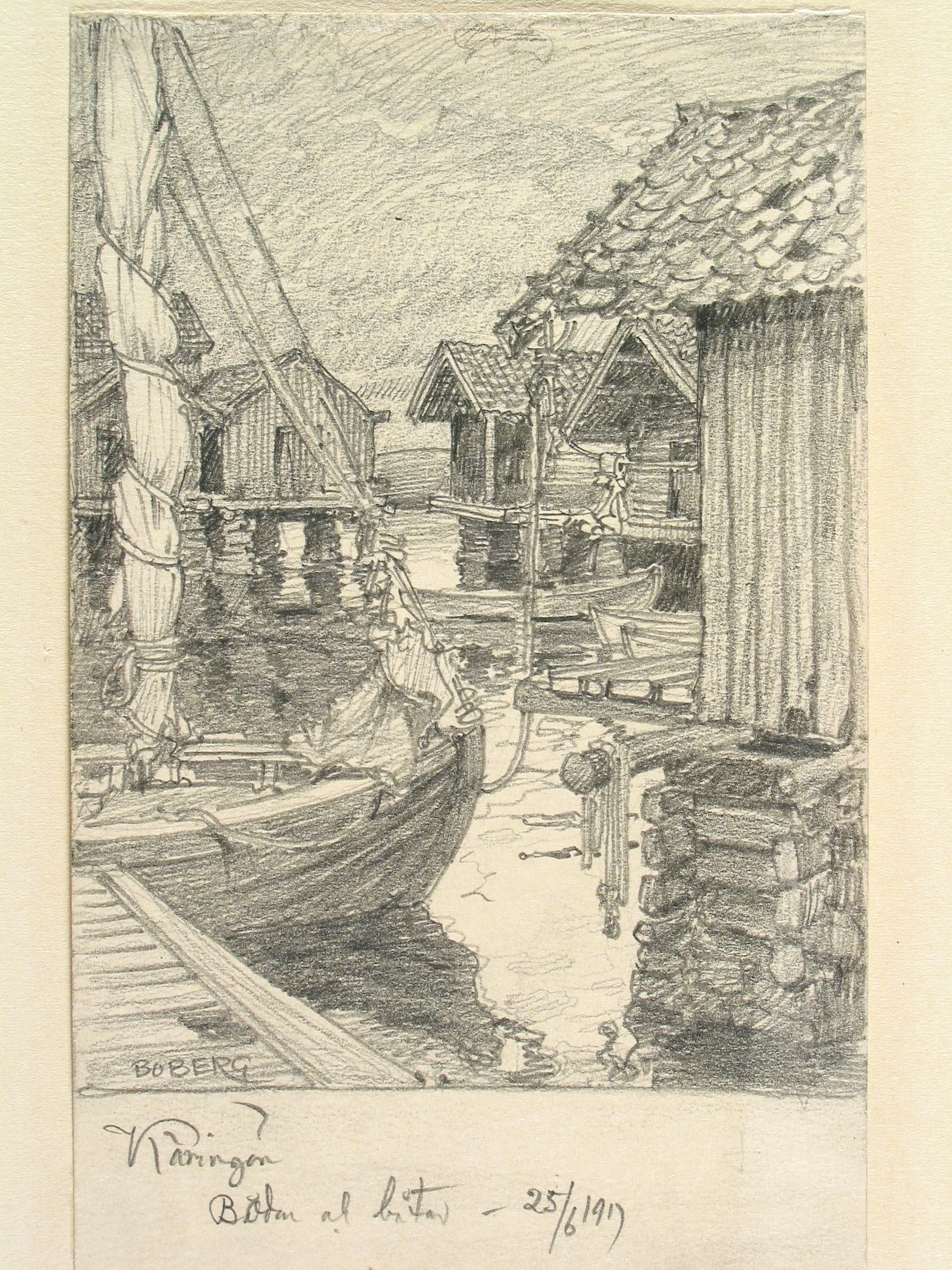
Small fishing huts on Käringön in the Bohuslän archipelago. Drawn by Ferdinand Boberg in 1917.

The commercial fishing of herring increased in the 18th century, and the province flourished during a major herring period between 1747–1809, causing many small fishing communities to be built up and down the Bohuslän coast.

Before the large scale fishing of herring started, Bohuslän had considerable forest cover. Timber was once the largest export product and main source of income of the province, but with the increased importance of fishing, more wood was used as construction material for houses and boats, and as fuel for herring oil boilers (trankokerier). Deforestation during the 19th century helped to give rise to today's more rugged, rocky landscape.

== Culture ==
A version of the Götaland dialect of Swedish is spoken in Bohuslän. The province was a part of Norway until 1658 as mentioned above. Traces of Norwegian remain in the dialect. 'Bohuslän', literally means the 'Fief of Bohus', referring to Bohus Fortress and län.

The Nordic Bronze Age (c. 1700–500 BCE) produced rock art showing scenes from the daily life and religious rituals, such as the examples found in Bohuslän. The rock art at Tanum, possibly made earlier, c. 2,500 to 3,000 years ago, have been entered as a site in the UNESCO World heritage program. Rock carvings can be found scattered throughout Bohuslän. The carvings portray the life of an agricultural society with images of daily life, with human figures, religious rituals, ships, circular objects, soles, animals, and fertility figures (e.g. phalluses); and the creation of shallow bowls.

== Hundreds ==
Nordic Bronze Age rock art at Tanum, Bohuslän

Hundreds of Sweden were sub-divisions of the Swedish provinces until the early 20th century. Bohuslän's hundreds were:

- Bullaren Hundred
- Inland Fräkne Hundred
- Inland Northern Hundred
- Inland Southern Hundred
- Inland Torpe Hundred
- Kville Hundred
- Lane Hundred
- Orust Eastern Hundred
- Orust Western Hundred
- Sotenäs Hundred
- Stångenäs Hundred
- Sörbygden Hundred
- Tanum Hundred
- Tjörn Hundred
- Tunge Hundred
- Vette Hundred
- Hisingen Western Hundred

== Sports ==
Despite the non-administrative status of BohusIän, some historical functions stiII remain with footbaII being administered by Bohusläns Fotbollförbund.

== Notable people from Bohuslän ==
People from Bohuslän are known as bohusläningar.

- Percy Barnevik, Uddevalla – businessman
- Emilie Flygare-Carlén, Strömstad – author
- Emma Jacobsson, Gothenburg – founder of Bohus Stickning
- Per Jacobsson – managing director of the International Monetary Fund
- Charles Magnus Lindgren, Dragsmark – Swedish-American shipping executive
- Ture Malmgren, Uddevalla – journalist and politician
- Karl Nordström, Tjörn – artist
- Ernst Skarstedt, Kungälv – Swedish-American author, journalist and editor
- Lisa Emelia Svensson – UN Ambassador for Oceans
- Jon Nödtveidt, Strömstad – Singer and guitar player for the Extreme Metal band Dissection
- Elin i Staxäng – folk healer executed for witchcraft in 1671
- Peter Sunde - Internet activist

== Gallery ==
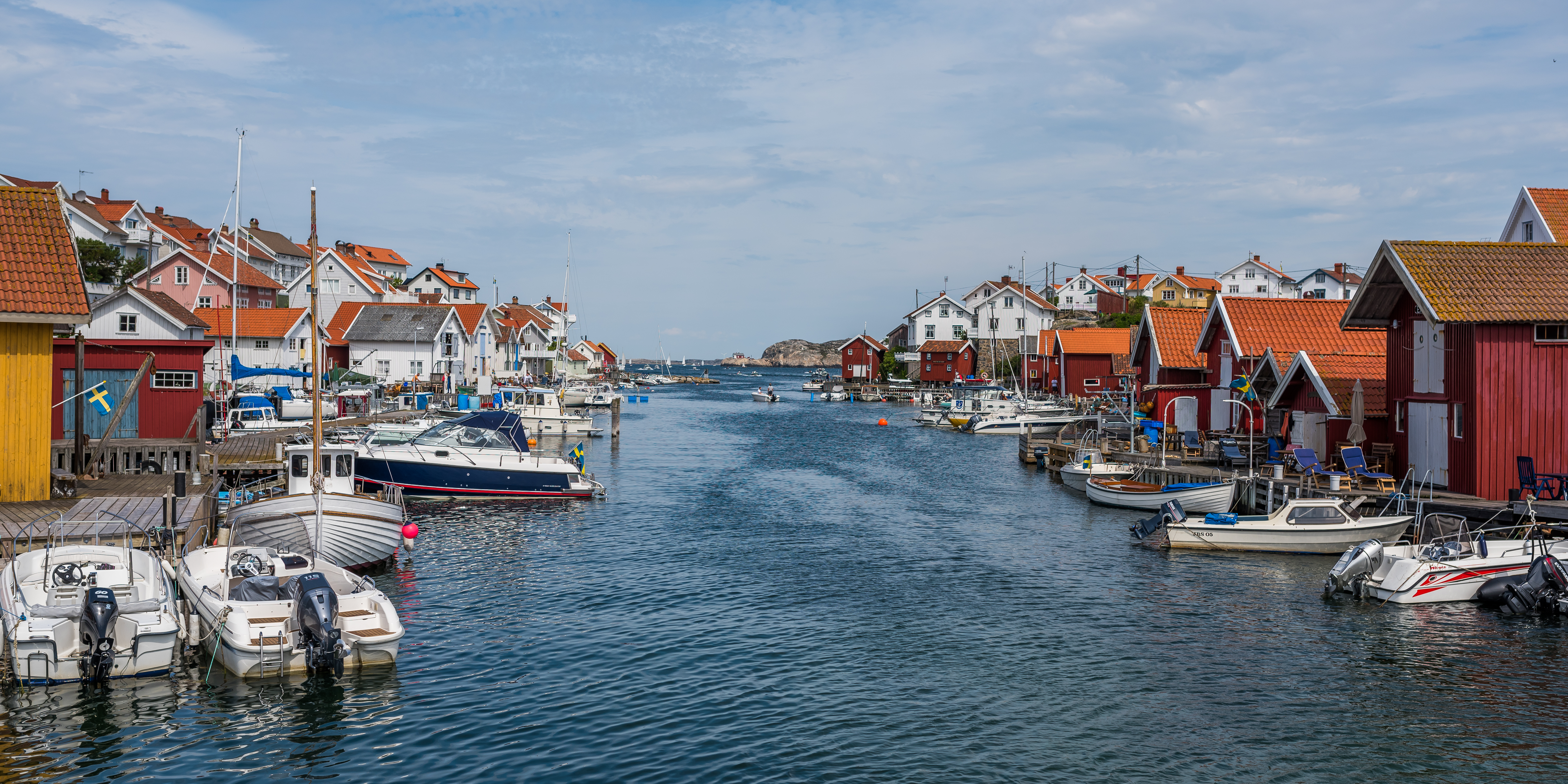
Gullholmen, Bohuslän July 2016

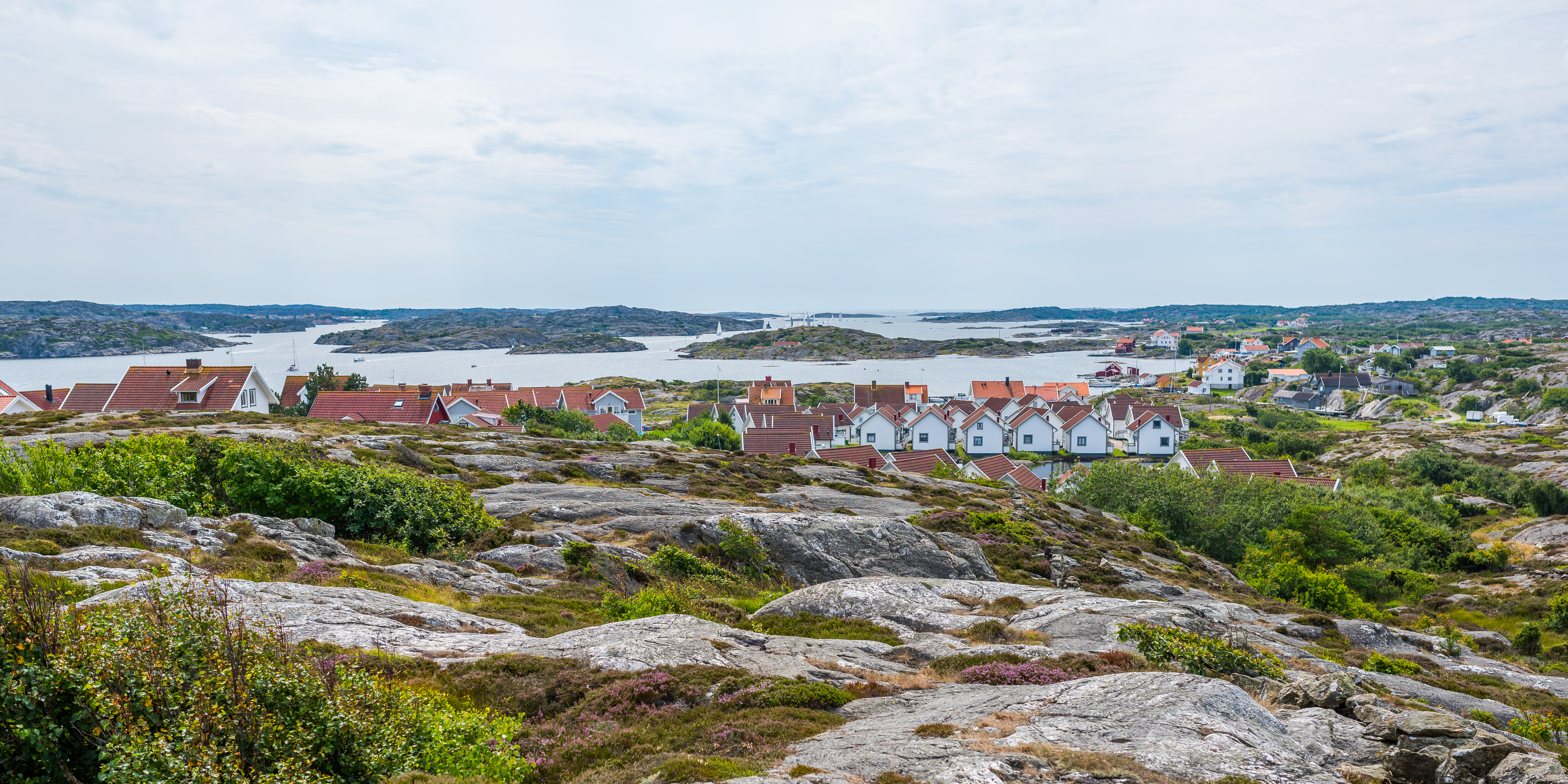
Käringön, Bohuslän July 2016

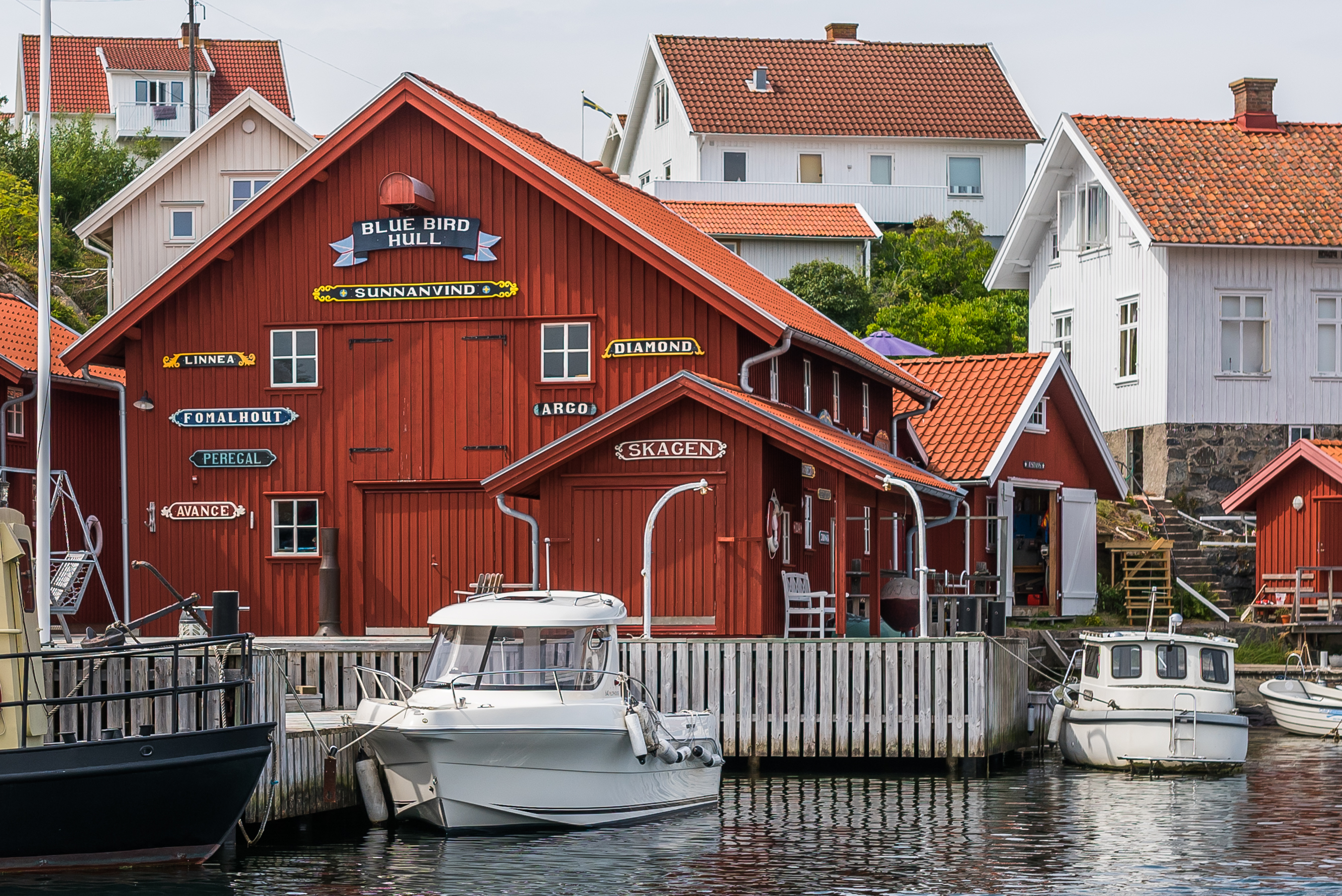
Gullholmen, Bohuslän July 2016

== See also ==
- History of Sweden
  - Prehistoric Sweden (9,000 BCE–800 CE: Stone and Bronze Ages)
  - Nordic Stone Age
  - Nordic Bronze Age
  - History of Sweden (800–1521 CE) (Viking and Middle Ages)
