= Styrsöbolaget =

Swedish shipping line

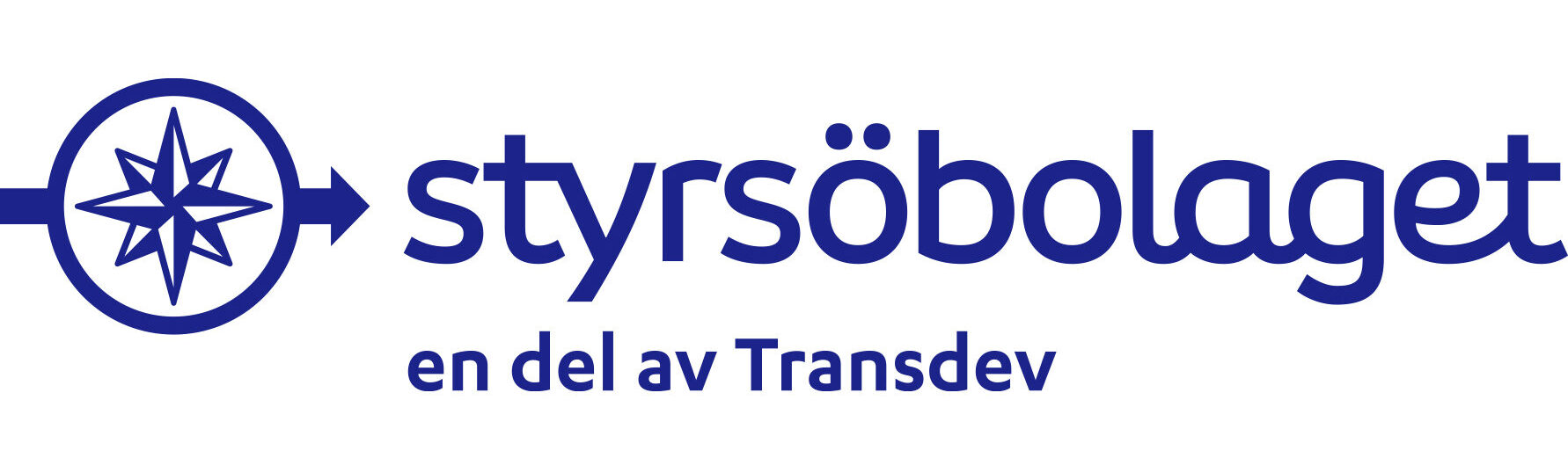

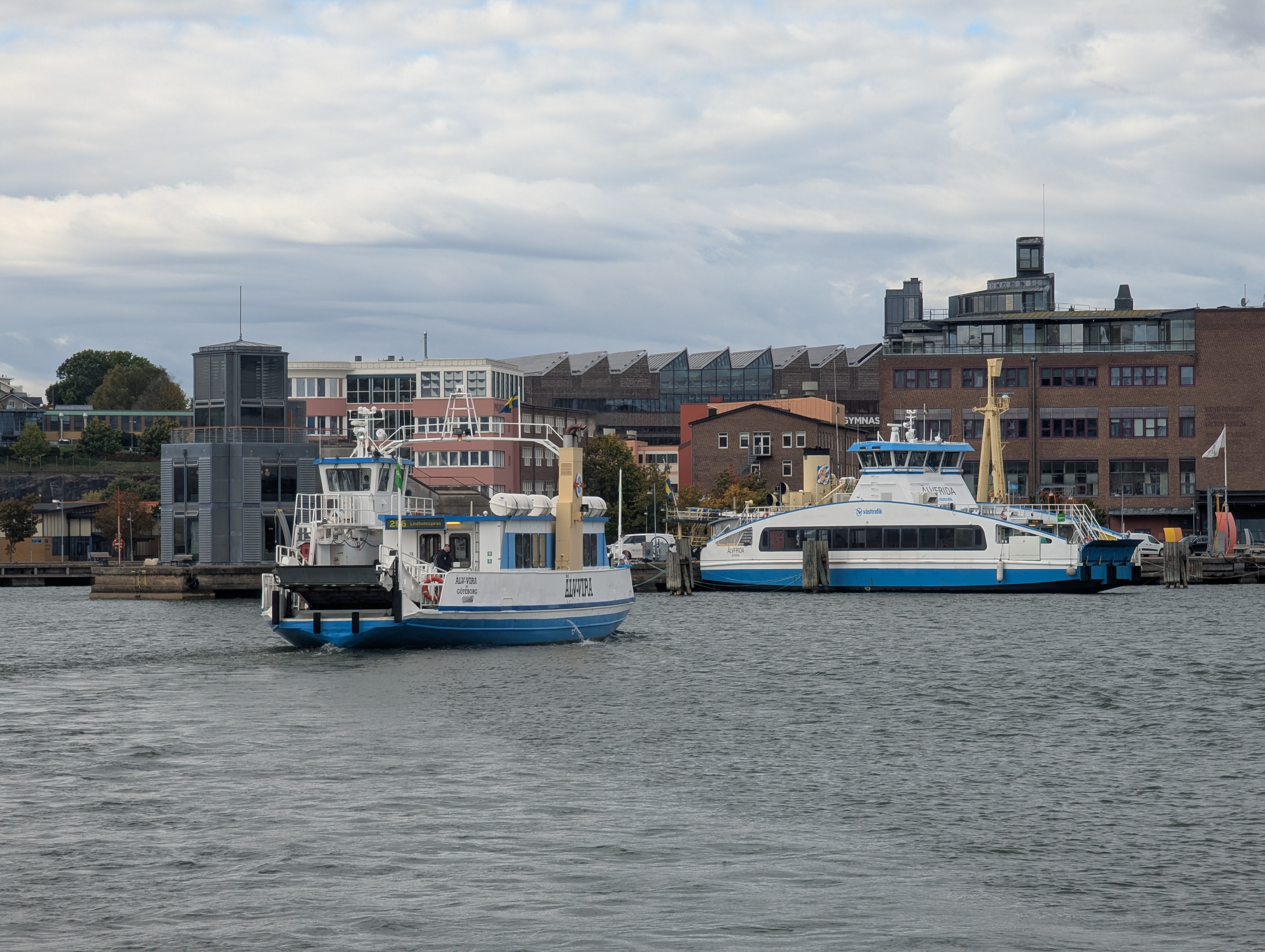
- Styrsöbolaget ferries Älv-Vira and Älvfrida in Gothenburg
- Locale: Gothenburg archipelago
- Transit type: Passenger and automobile ferry
- Owner: Transdev Sverige AB
- Authority: Västtrafik
- Began operation: 1922; 104 years ago
- No. of vessels: 16
- Website: styrsobolaget.se

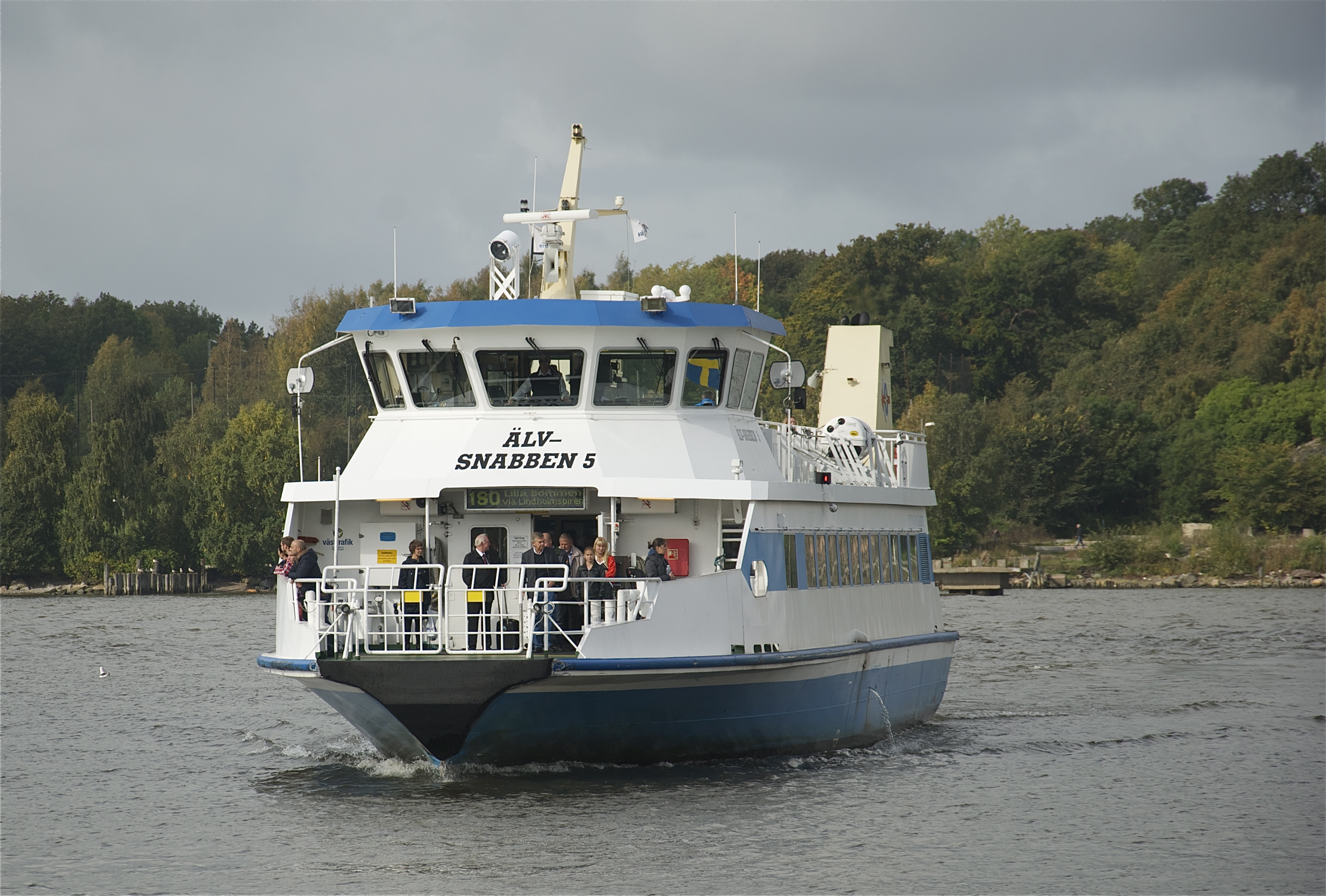
Älvsnabben 5 travelling on Göta älv in central Gothenburg.

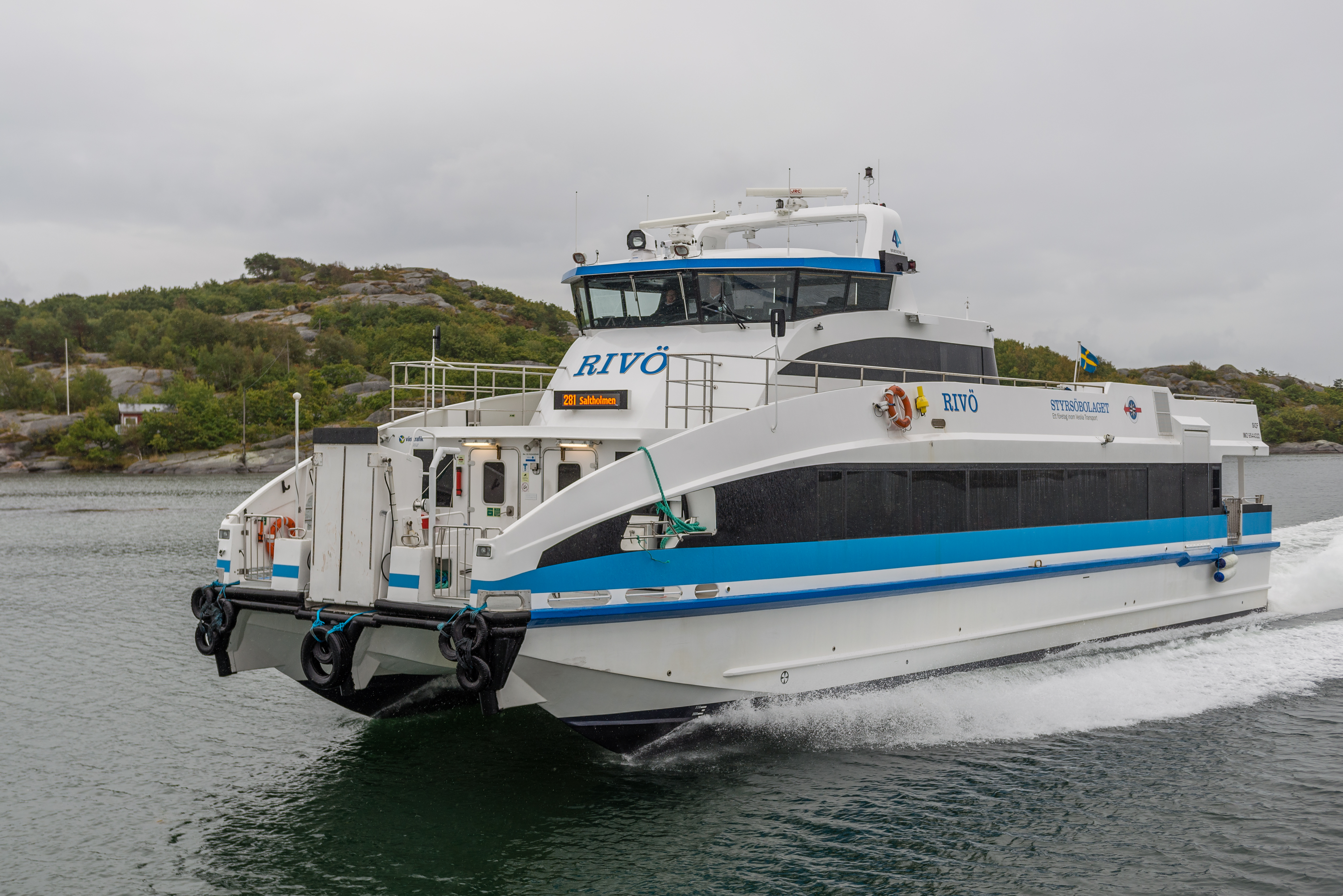
The express ship Rivö in the sound between Donsö and Styrsö. Valö is identical.

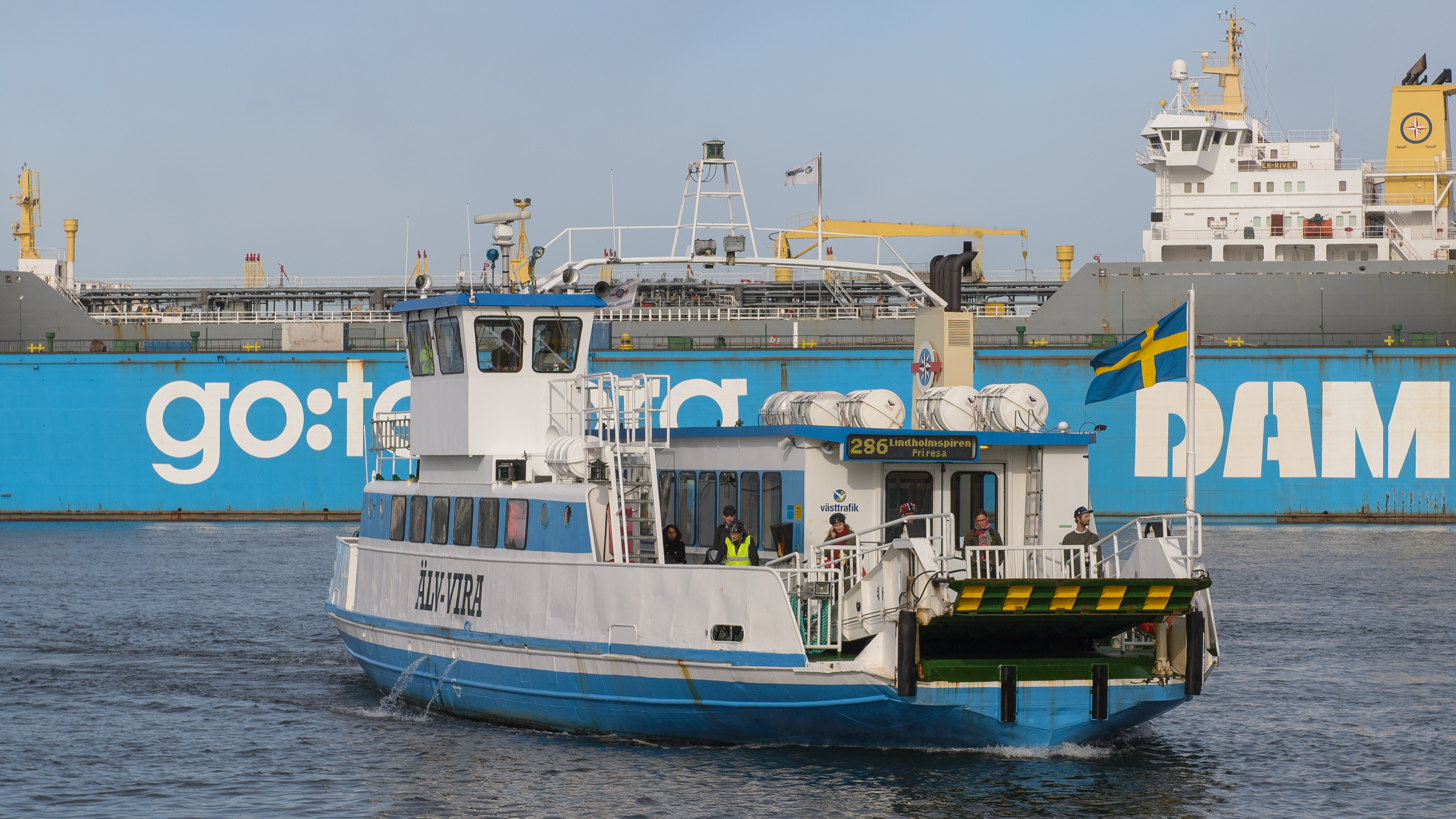
Älv-Vira on the cost-free line between Lindholmen and Roselund. This line has been replaced with the cost-free line between Lindholmen and Stenpiren, which is also trafficked by Älveli and Älvfrida.

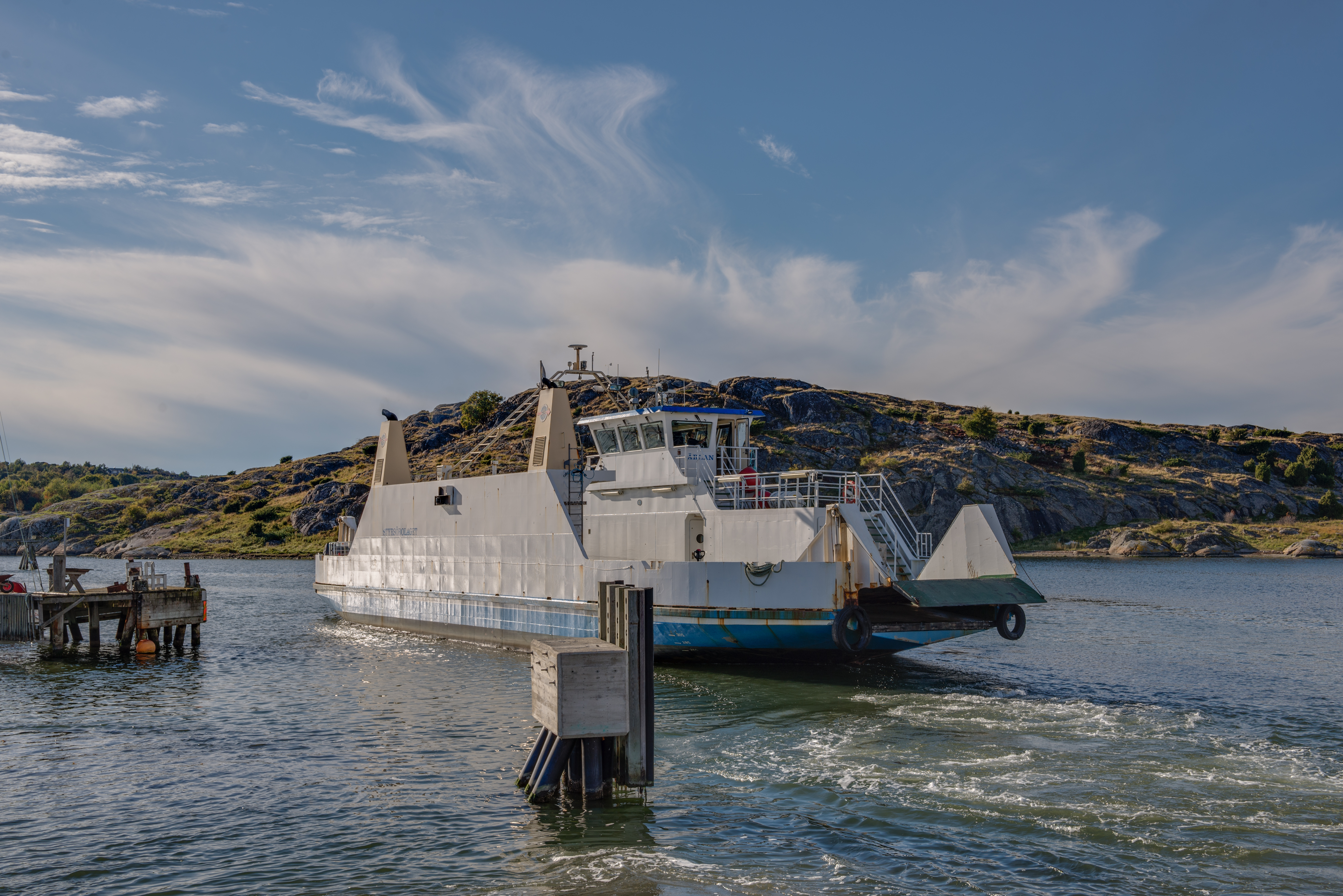
Ärlan in the sound between Asperö and Rivö.

Styrsöbolaget is a Swedish shipping line owned by Transdev Sverige AB. Styrsöbolaget operates maritime public transport in the Gothenburg archipelago and on the Göta älv river (on the "Älvsnabben" ferry line) on a commission from Västtrafik. In the southern archipelago the line also transports cargo. The passenger ships to the southern archipelago depart from Saltholmen, accessible by the Gothenburg tram line 11, and Ö-Snabben from the city centre. The cargo and car ships depart from Fiskebäck.

Styrsöbolaget was founded in 1922 under the name Styrsö Nya Trafik AB. In the same year Styrsö Havsbad began to drive its own traffic. These companies merged in 1928 into a joint company that developed into Styrsö Trafik AB. Since 1999 passenger traffic to the archipelago has been handled on a commission from Västtrafik, which is responsible for the public transport in the Västra Götaland Regional Council. Styrsöbolaget was privatised in summer 2000 and has been owned by Transdev Sverige since January 2004.

== Ships ==
Traffic is handled by 16 different ships. Many of the ships in the shipping line have historical names.

The ships are:

- Fröja, built 1980, 382 passengers
- Göta II, cargo ship, built in 1969
- Kungsö, built in 1986, renovated from 2017 to 2018, 273 passengers, onboard café
- Lagnö, cargo ship, built in 1957, renovated in 1969, 2006 and from 2017 to 2018.
- Silvertärnan, built in 1986, 389 passengers, onboard café
- Skarven, built in 1981, 300 passengers
- Vesta, built in 1998, 447 passengers, onboard café
- Vipan, built in 1978, 300 passengers
- Ylva, built in 1989, 447 passengers, onboard café
- Älvsnabben 3, built in 1973, 300 passengers
- Älvsnabben 4, built in 1994, 448 passengers
- Älvsnabben 5, built in 1995, 448 passengers
- Älv-Vira, combined passenger and car ship, built in 1954, 300 passengers
- Ärlan, car ship, built in 1990, 98 passengers
- Valö, express ship, built in 2010, 163 passengers
- Rivö, express ship, built in 2010, 163 passengers
- Älveli, cost-free commuter ship, built in 2014, 300 passengers
- Älvfrida, cost-free commuter ship, built in 2014, 300 passengers
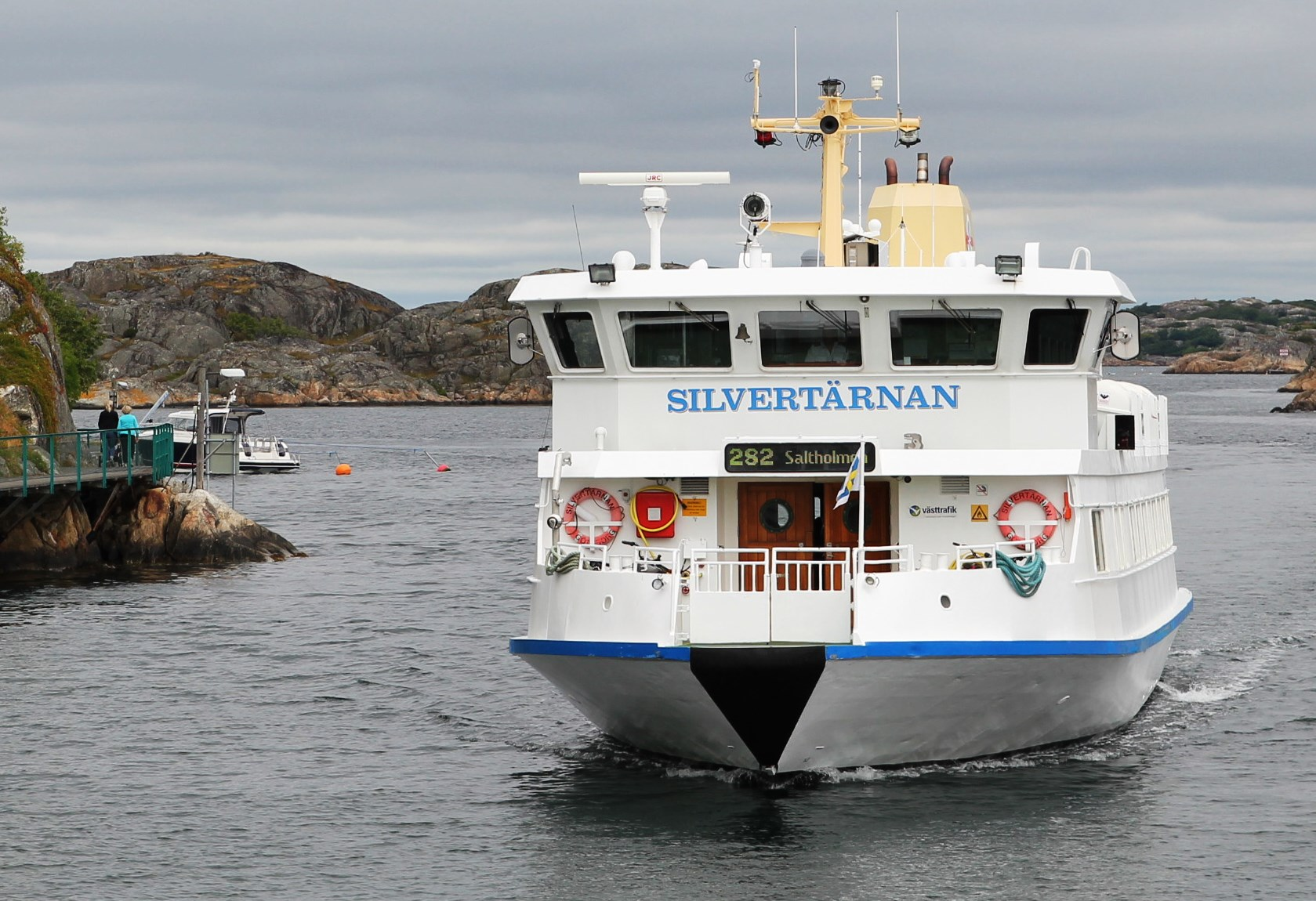
Silvertärnan

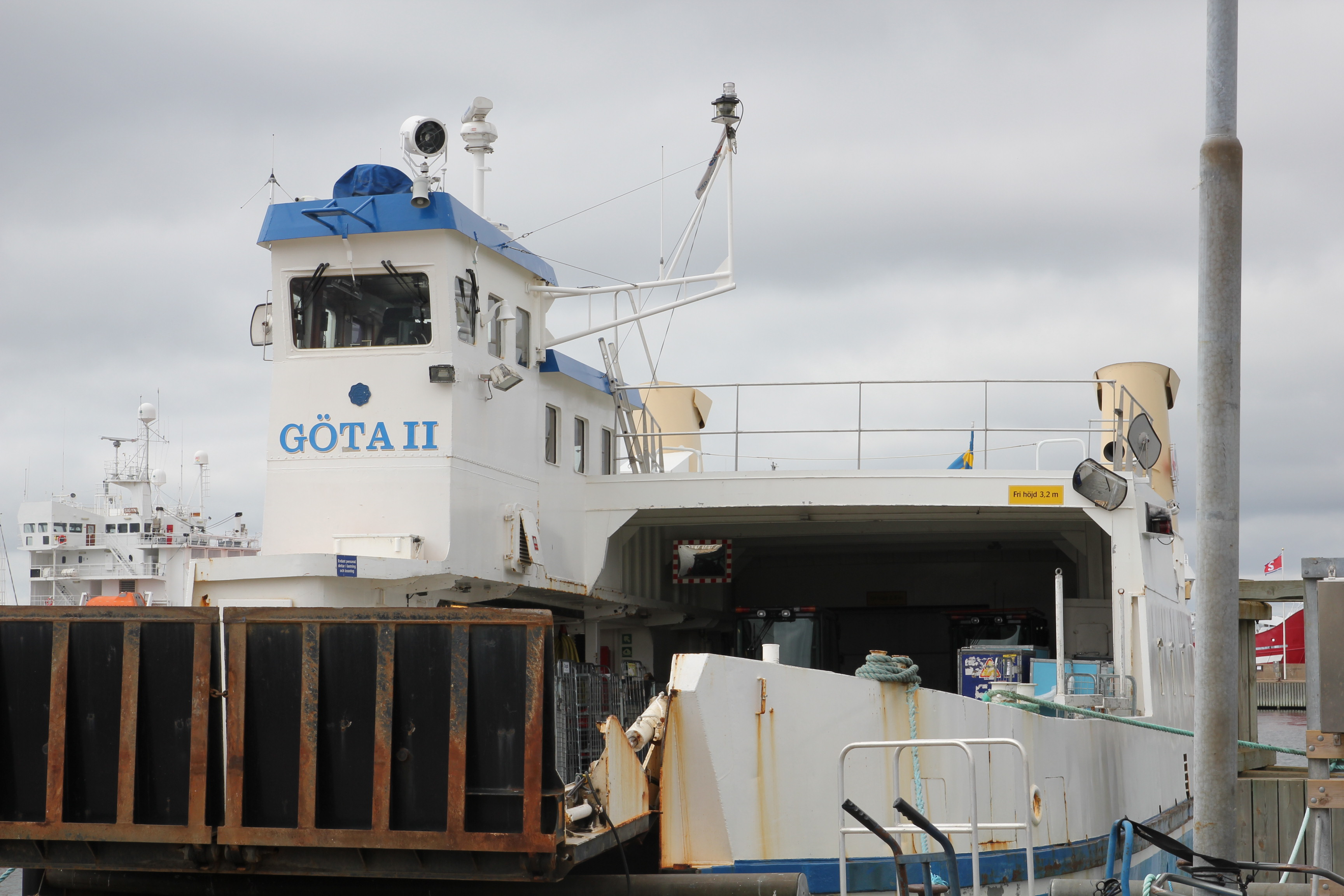
The cargo ship Göta II.

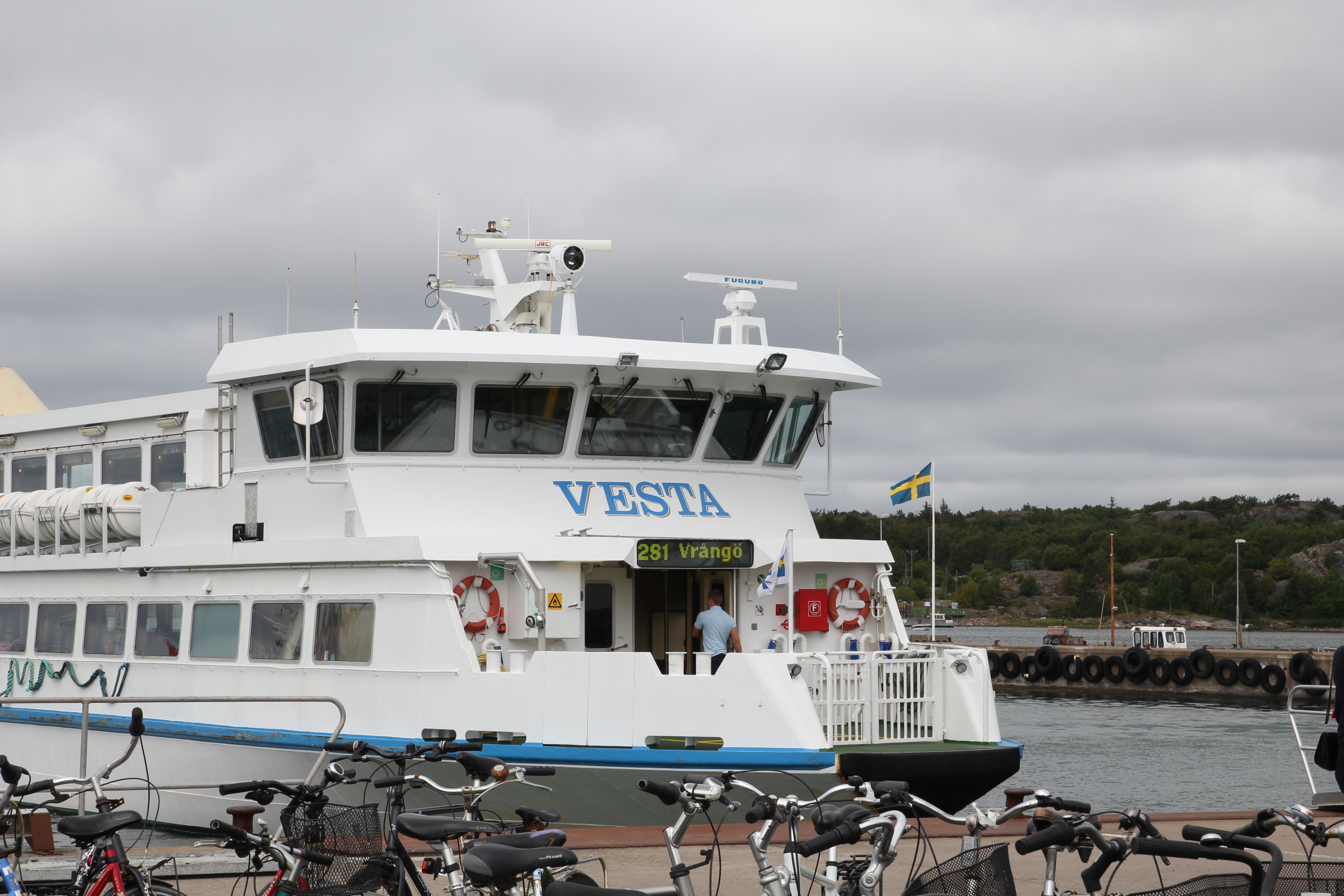
Vesta

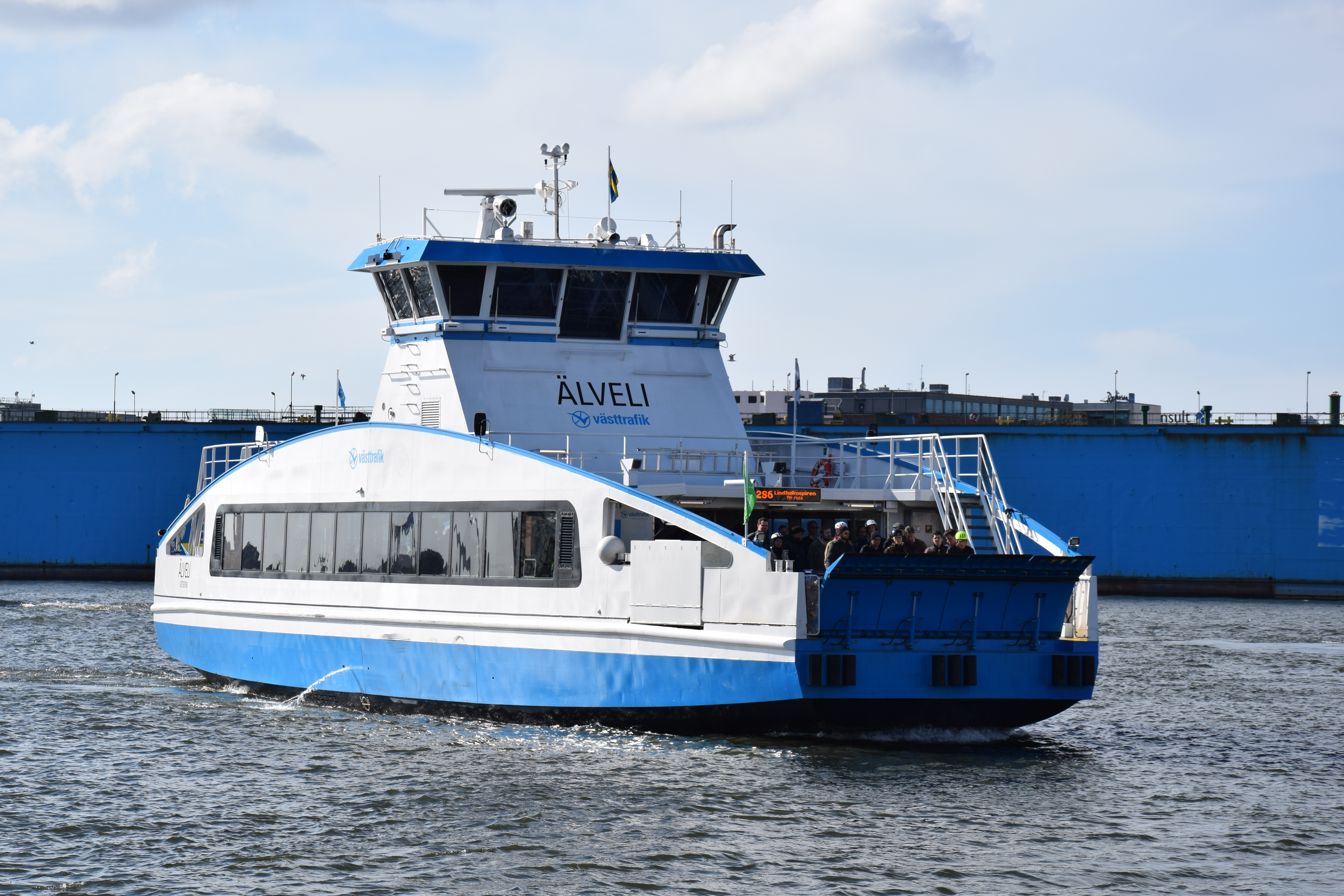
Älveli, one of the cost-free ships between Lindholmen and Stenpiren. Älvfrida is identical.

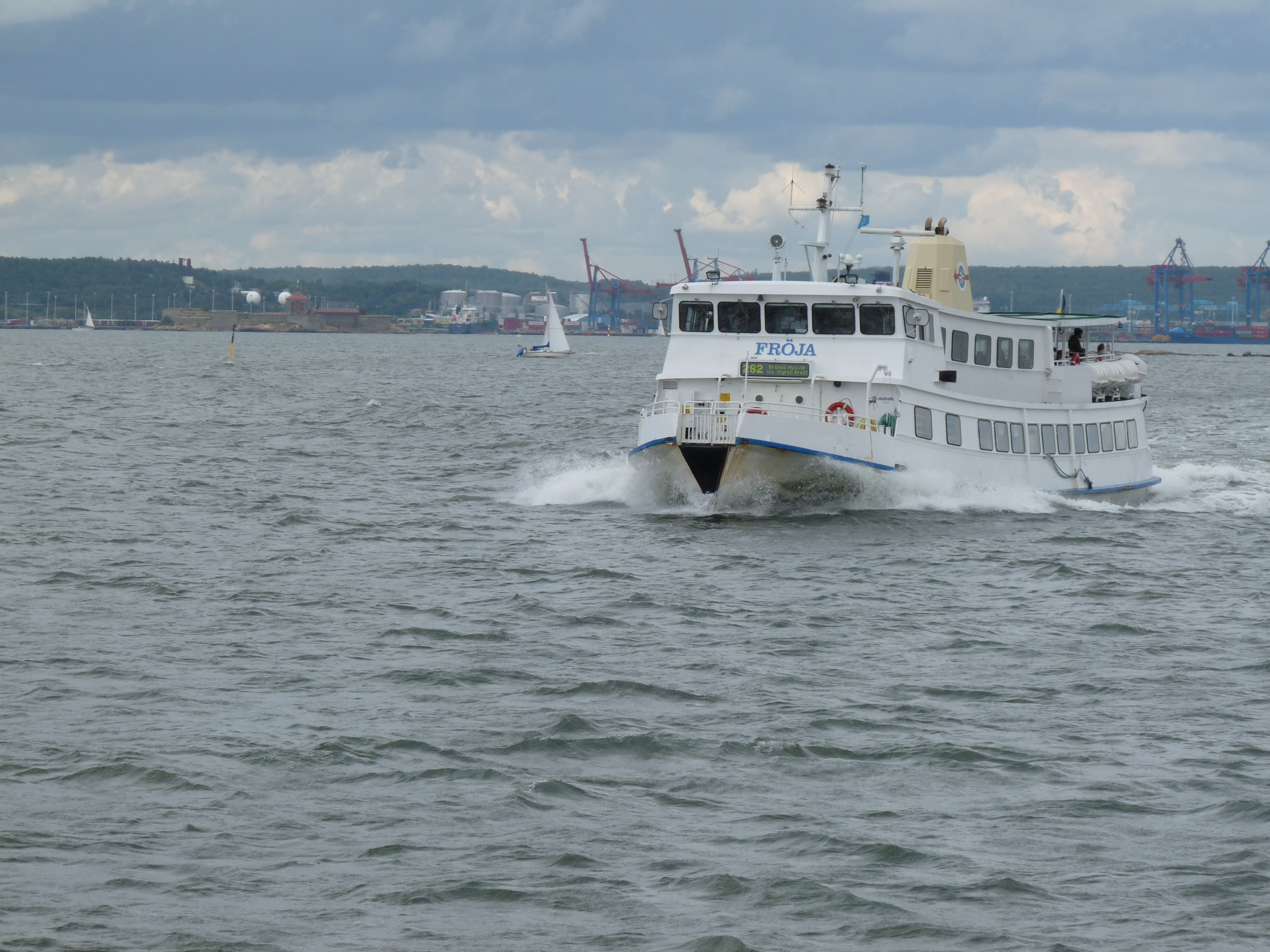
Fröja

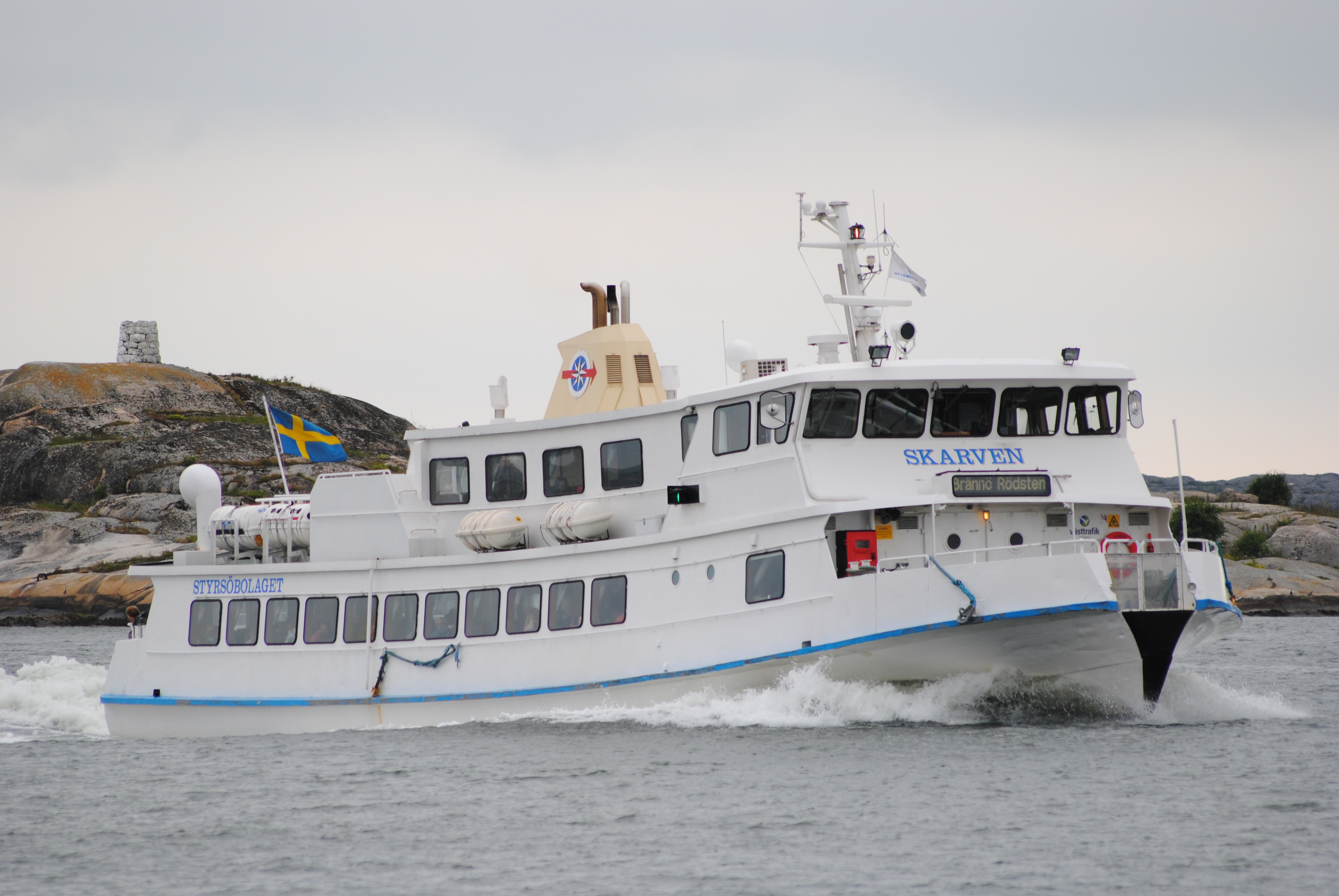
Skarven

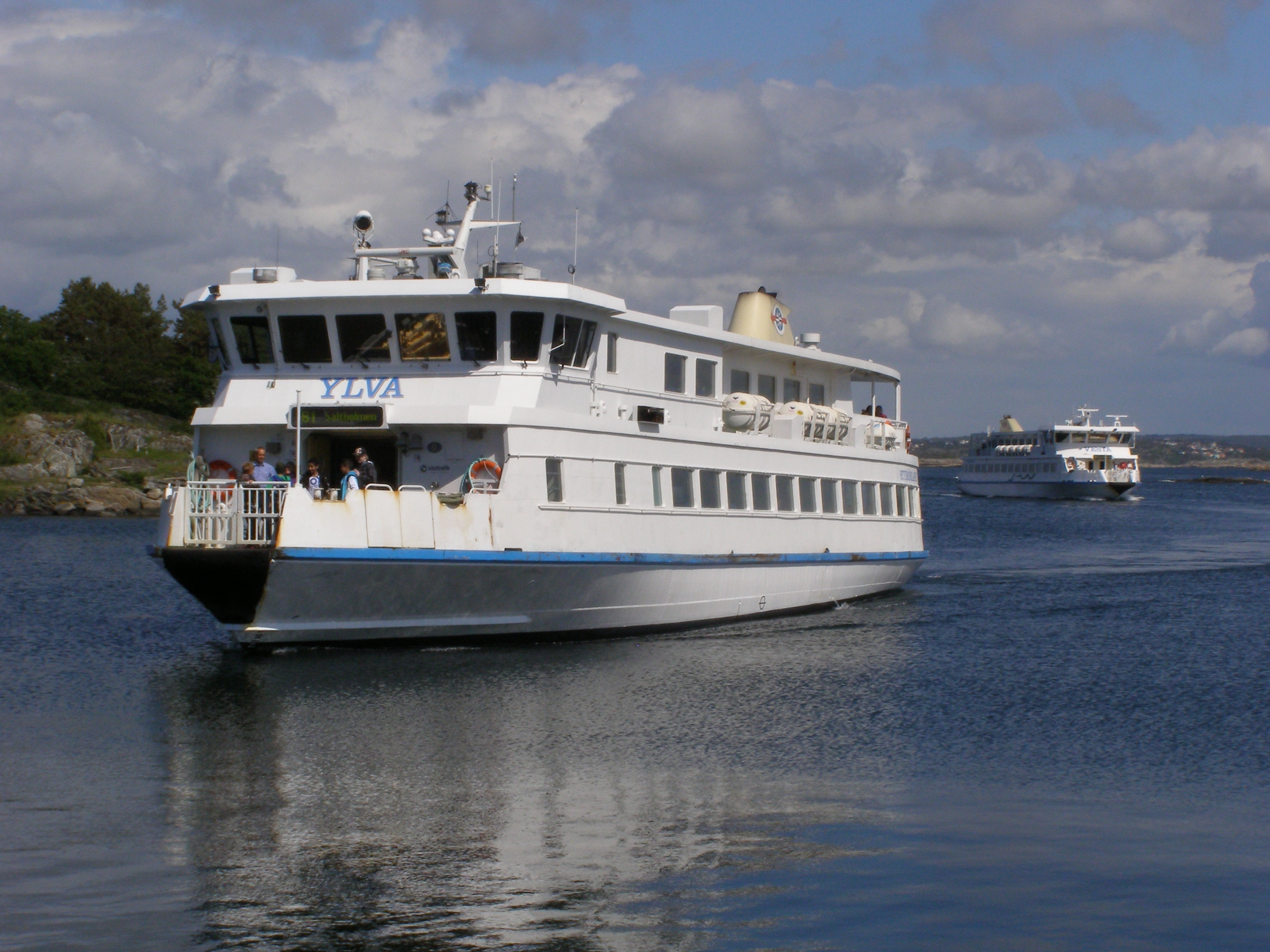
Ylva

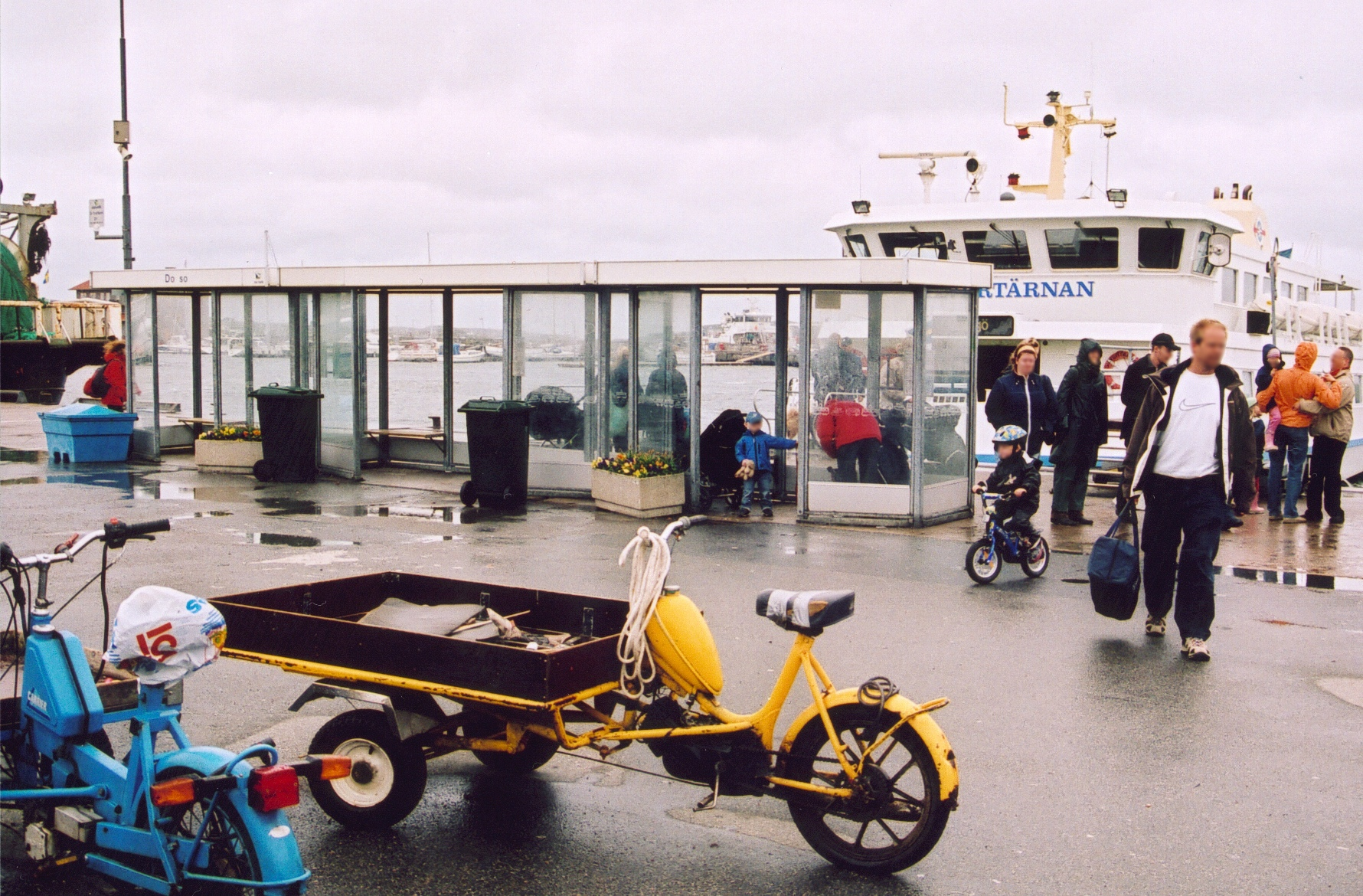
Silvertärnan docked at Donsö.

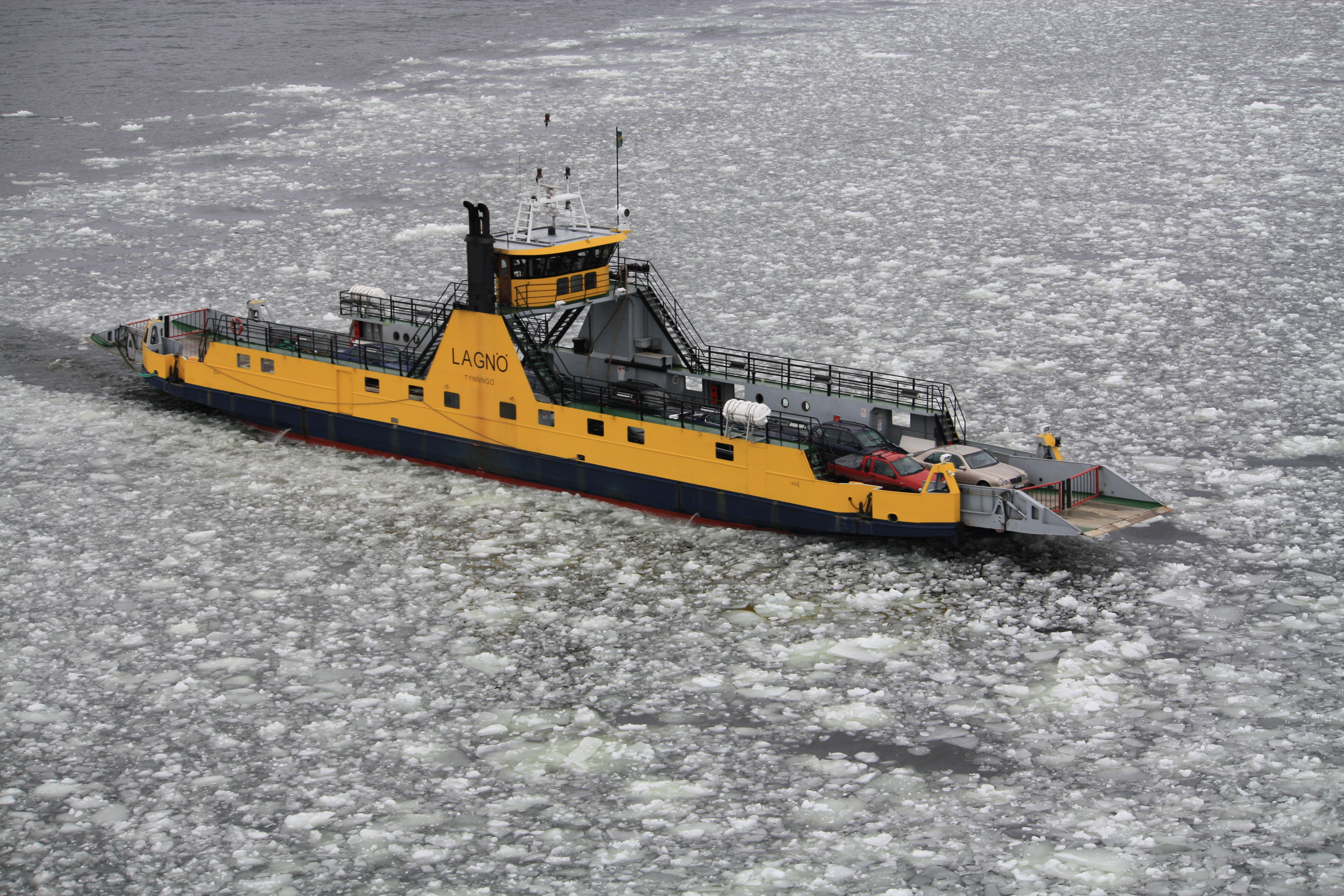
Lagnö before being renovated for use for Styrsöbolaget.

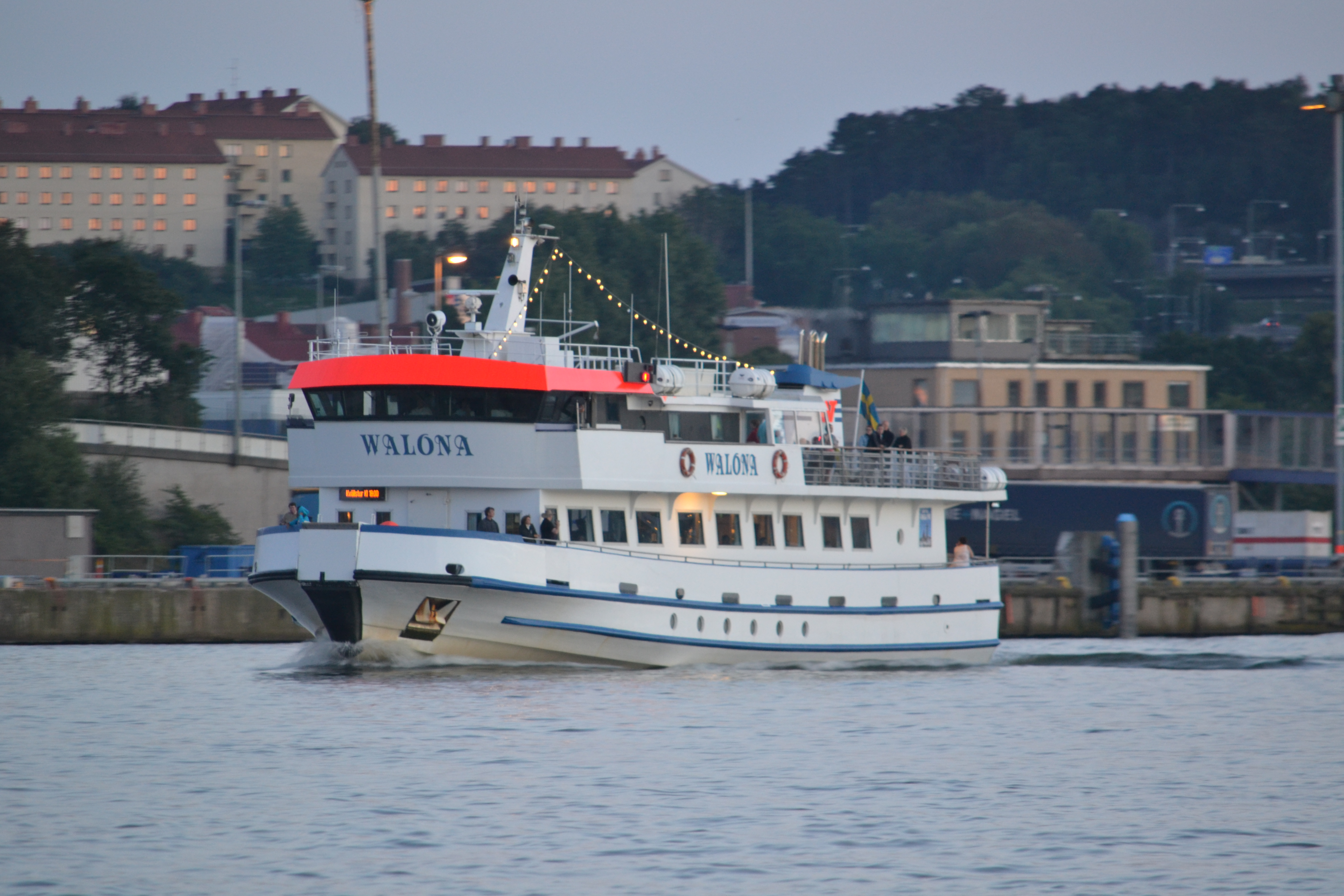
Kungsö before being renovated for use for Styrsöbolaget. The ship was named Walona at the time.

== Traffic ==
Styrsöbolaget operates archipelago traffic on the routes Saltholmen-Asperö-Köpstadsö-Styrsö-Donsö-Vrångö, Styrsö-Källö-Vargö-Brännö at Husvik, Saltholmen-Aseprö-Brännö Rödsten and Saltholmen-Knarrholmen-Förö. Styrsöbolaget also operates traffic on Göta älv on the route Lilla Bommen-Stenpiren-Lindholmen-Slottsberget-Eriksberg-Klippan.

On normal weekdays in the archipelago traffic the express ships Valö and Rivö go to Vrångö. Ylva traffics to Styrsö Tången and Brannö Husvik, and through a few turns to Vrångö and some trips to Brännö Rödsten. Vesta traffics on mostly the same routes as Ylva. Silvertärnan traffics to Brännö Rödsten with some trips to Styrsö Tången, Brännö Husvik and Vrångö. Fröja and Vipan are reserve ships in case some ship is on the dock or cannot traffic for some other reason. Fröja is often used in place of the express ships, as she is larger and better suited for daily archipelago traffic, but still slower than the express ships. She has some trips of her own in both summer and winter. Vipan is older and narrower, but faster, so she is often used to replace the express ships. Vipan has trips of her own in summer, but in winter she is only a reserve ship for the express ships, without trips of her own. If there is need, Skarven, who has trafficked in the archipelago for 37 years from 1981 to 2018, can be moved to the archipelago. Skarven is used every year as reinforcement and can even travel under ice periods when the express ships cannot travel. As Skarven is made of aluminium she goes back to the river when the ice in the archipelago becomes too difficult for her to move in. In winter, Skarven is mostly used as a reserve ship for Älvsnabben.

Traffic on the river is handled by both Älvsnabben and cost-free commuter ships. Älvsnabben 4 and 5 usually handle the Älvsnabben traffic, with Älvsnabben 3 and Skarven as reserve ships. One of them starts at Klippan, the other at Lilla Bommen. Älvsnabben has traffic nearly throughout the day. The ships travel in the morning, in the day and in late evenings both on weekdays and on weekends. There is even a cost-free commuter line which only traffics on weekdays between Stenpiren and Lindhomspiren, on Älveli and Älvrfida. Älv-Vira is sometimes used as a reserve ship. The line is trafficked between morning and early evening.
