= Älvsborg, Gothenburg =

District of Gothenburg, Sweden

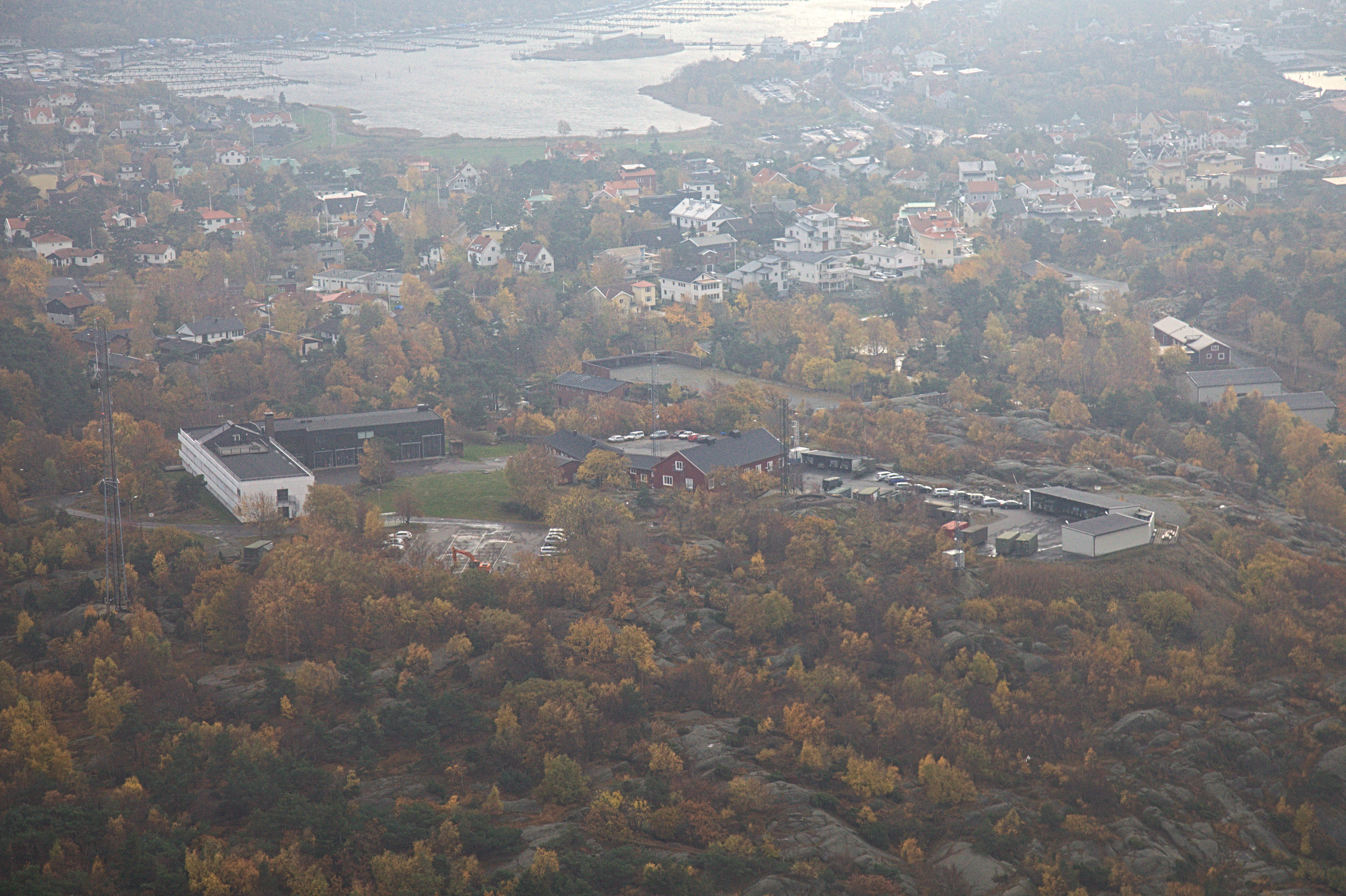
Aerial view across the central parts (Käringsberget) of Älvsborg.

Älvsborg is an urban district of Gothenburg in Sweden.

Älvsborg is a coastal district situated in western Gothenburg at the mouth of the Rivö Fjord and comprise 1,210 hectares. The Älvsborg Bridge connects the southern and northern parts of Gothenburg.

== History ==
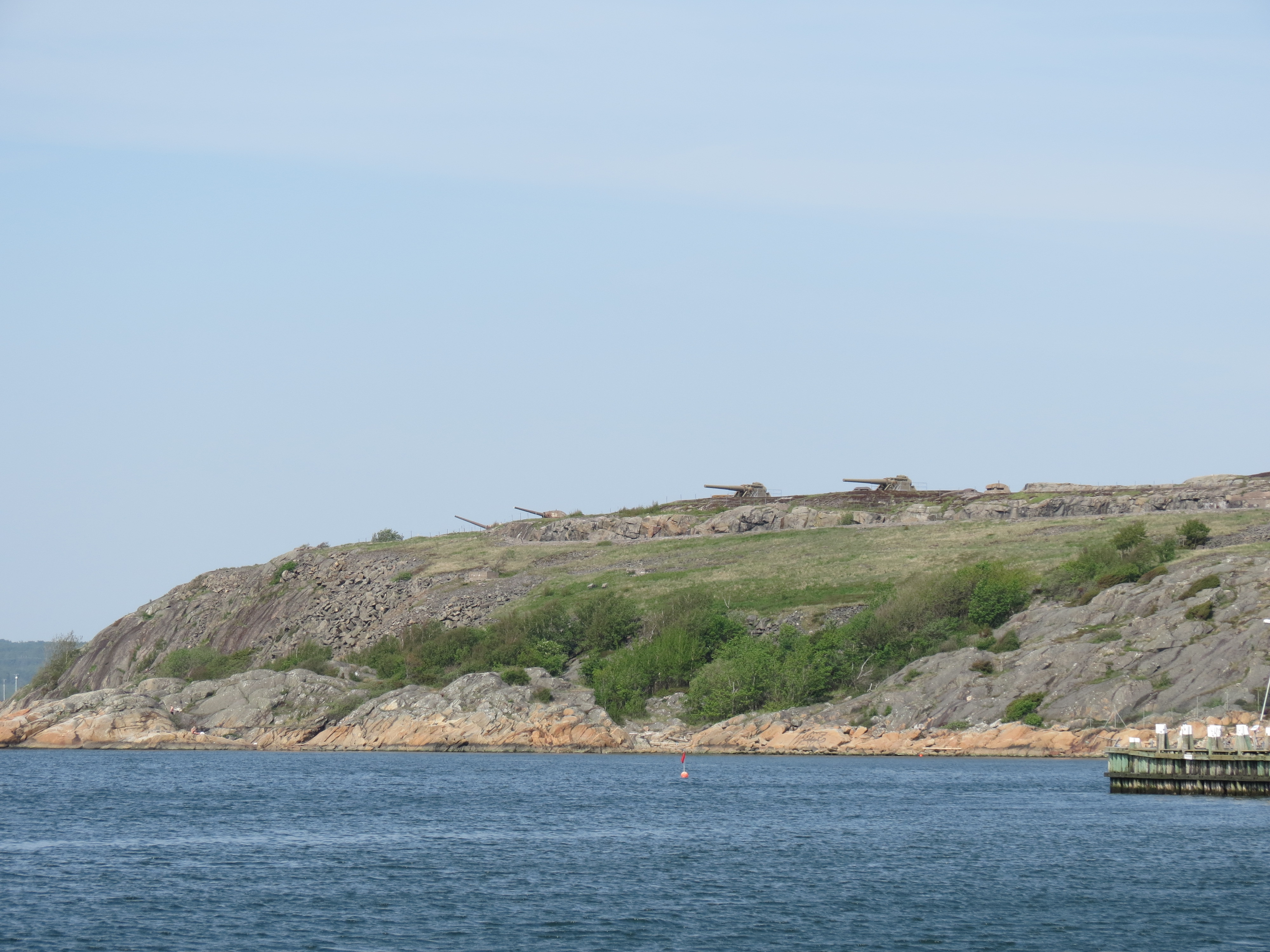
Oscar II's Fort, now a military museum.

Älvsborg became a part of Gothenburg on 1 January 1868, some parts later on 1 January 1945. The district is named after a former large sea fortress, now in ruins and referred to as Old Älvsborg Fortress. The fortress was dismantled in the 17th century and relocated to an island on the northern parts of the fjord mouth. This New Älvsborg Fortress was important for the protection of the newly founded city of Gothenburg (1621).

In 1903-7 the Oscar II fort was constructed in Älvsborg, guarding the entry to Gothenburg. It includes a number of heavy artillery cannons and are still existing today, even though it was decommissioned in 1955. The site is now a museum.

== Neighbourhoods ==
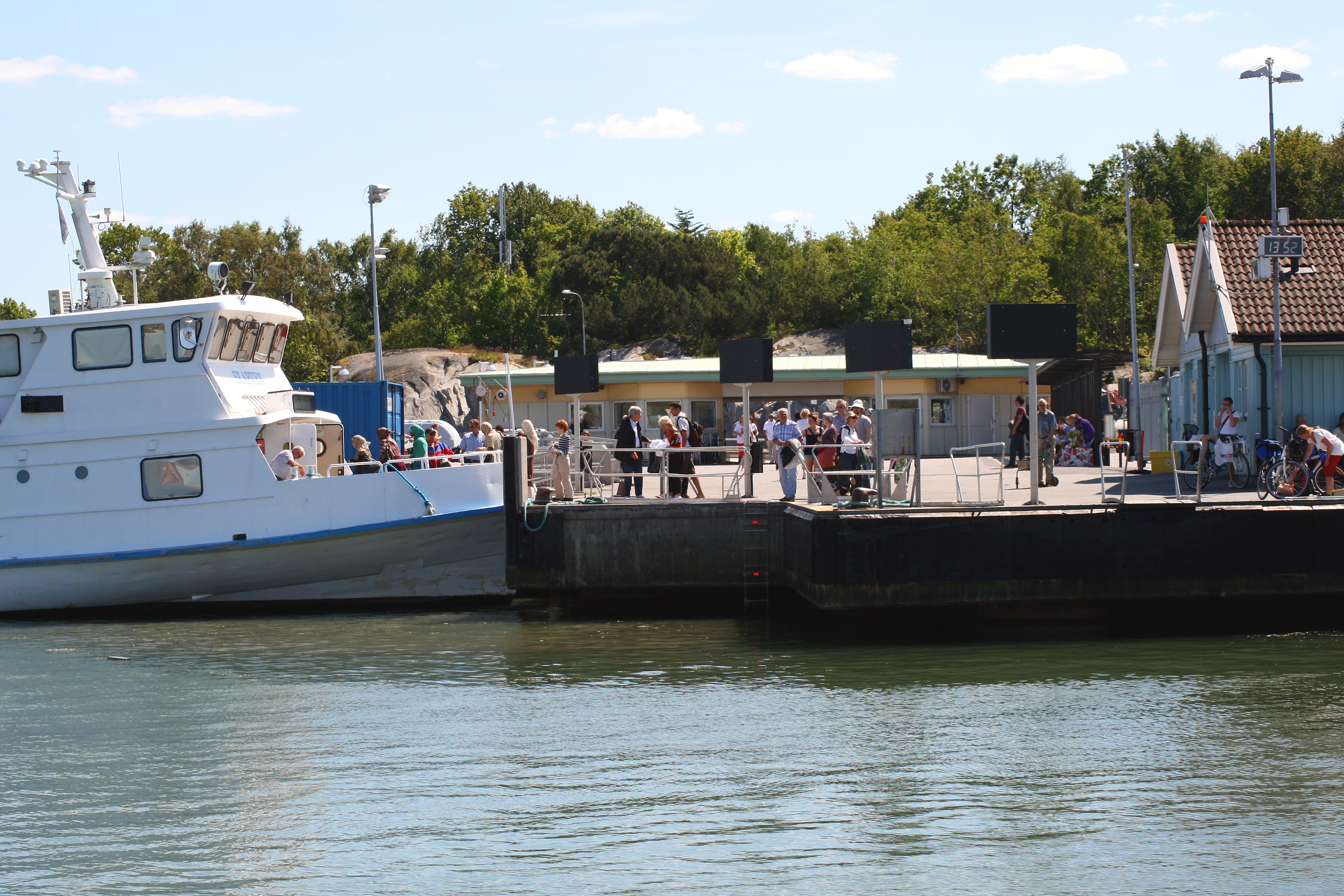
At Saltholmen, ferries transports passengers around the Archipelago of Gothenburg.

Älvsborg comprise the neighbourhoods of Stora Billingen, Käringberget, Tranered, Hagen, Långedrag and Vässingsö.

A notable neighbourhood within Vässingsö is Saltholmen, a peninsula reaching out into the Archipelago of Gothenburg. It was originally an island, but modern constructions has made it into a peninsula. From Saltholmen, a number of ferries transports passengers around the entire Archipelago of Gothenburg. There is also a large marina near Saltholmen and Aspholmen close-by is a popular place for seabathing in the summer.
