= Saltholmen, Gothenburg =

Peninsula in Gothenburg, Sweden

Coordinates: 57°39′38.33″N 11°50′33.27″E

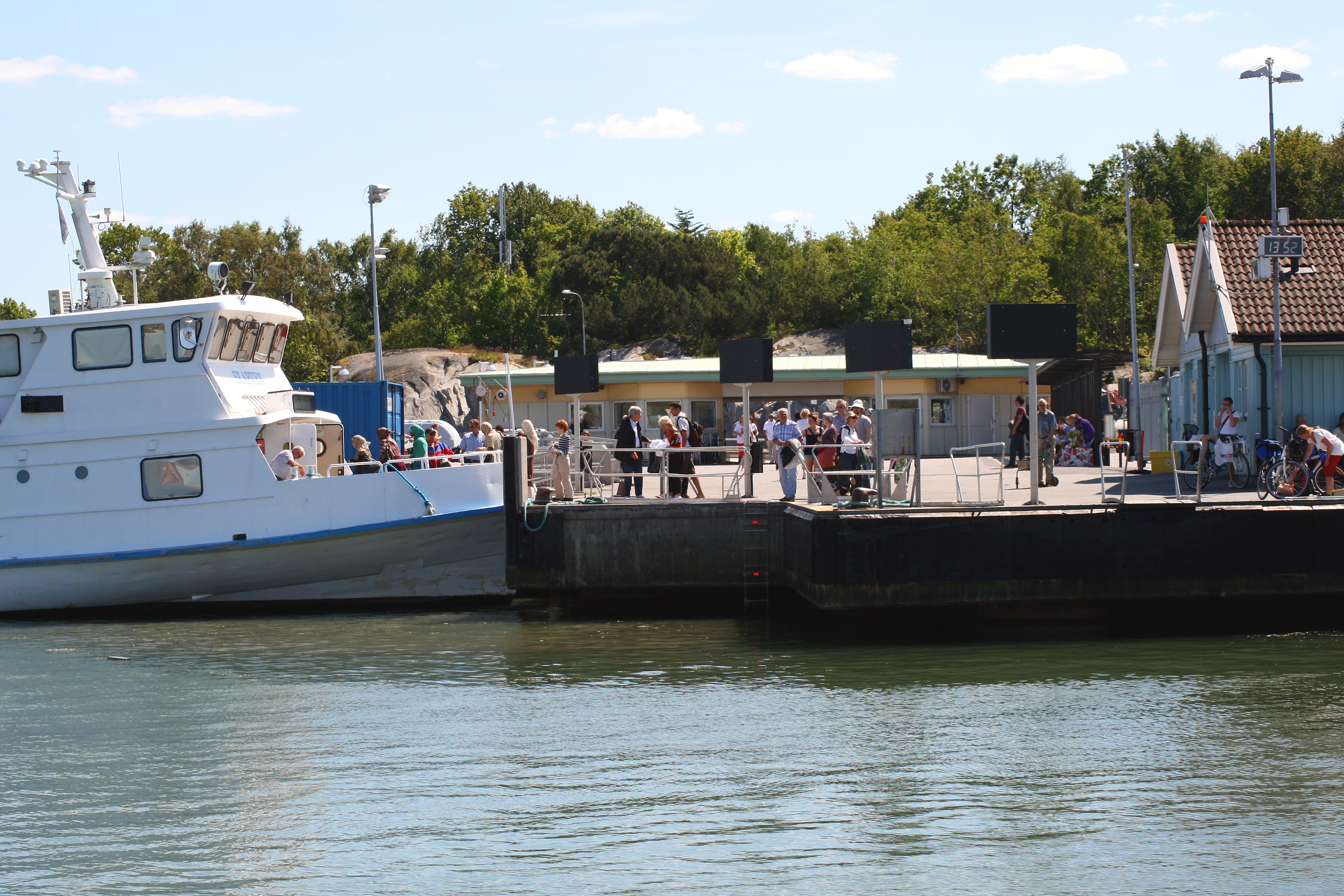
The harbour for Styrsöbolaget's archipelago ships in Saltholmen.

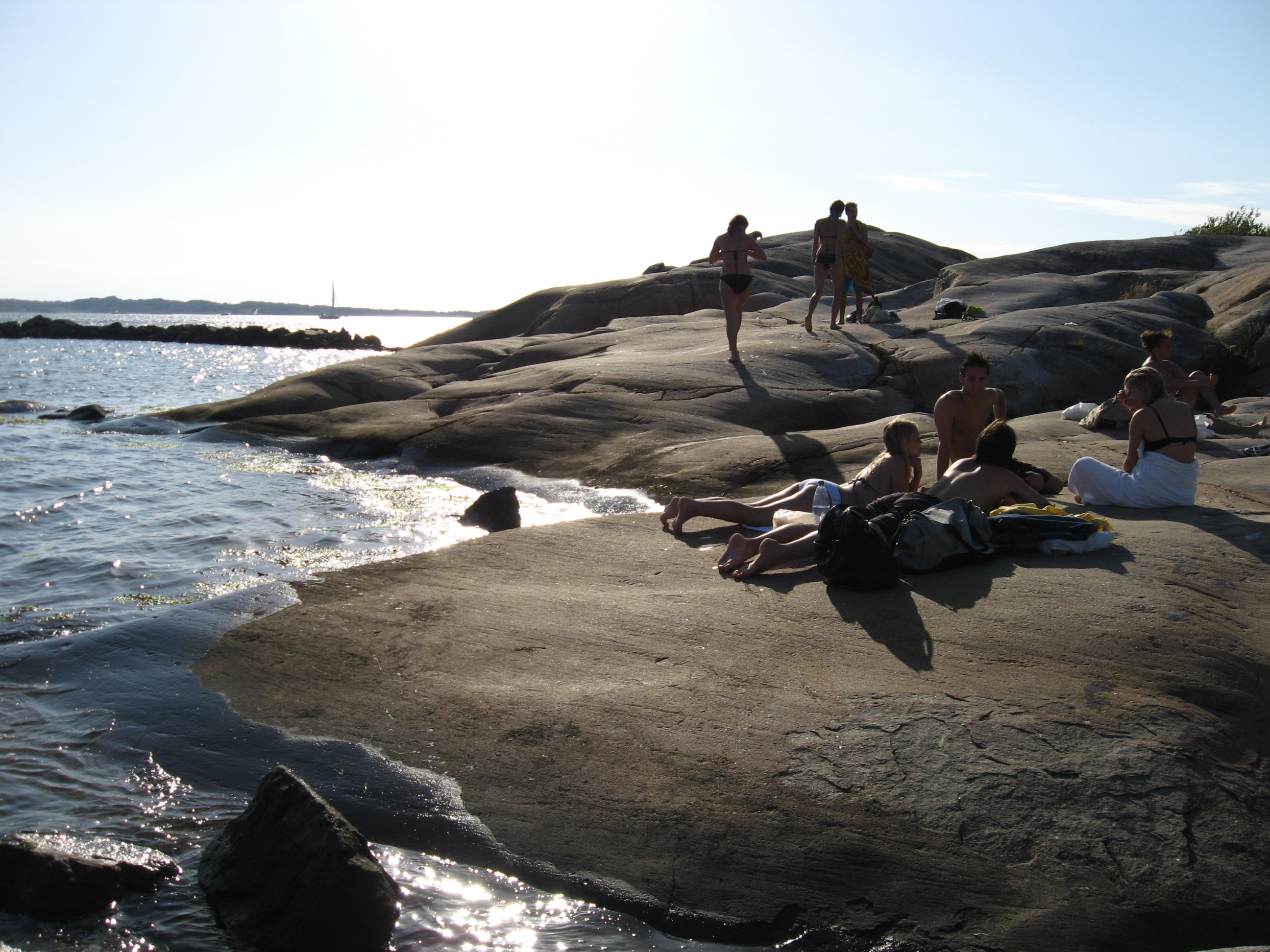
Saltholmen is a classic bathing area in Gothenburg.

Saltholmen is a peninsula on the southern shore of Älvsborgsfjorden in the district of Älvsborg in Gothenburg, Sweden. It was originally an island, but during the construction of the Gothenburg tram network a connection was made to the mainland. The connection has since been widened to accommodate car parking, making Saltholmen effectively a peninsula.

== History ==
The company Aktiebolag Långedrag was founded in 1903, which was supposed to renovate the area from Långedrag to Saltholmen, including constructing a swimming area on Saltholmen. The tram network was extended to Saltholmen from 1906 to 1908. The original plans were not realised, but from 1906 to 1908 a warm bathing area, a cold bathing area and a restaurant were built. The latter was later replaced by a café in 1915, which is still in use. Saltholmen's parking area is located near the cold bathing area and the café. There is a transformer tower on the top next to the warm bathing area. In 1923 a swimming stadium was built on Saltholmen. The swimming pool was 50 x 25 metres with eight tracks, two springboards and a trampoline. The auditorium seated 970 persons.

The warm bathing area represents Art Nouveau architecture and has a tight bath, a Finnish-style sauna, pools and bridges. The area was closed down in 1982 and later converted into an office. There are premises of the Gothenburg canoe association on Saltholmen.

== Saltholmsgatan ==
There are villas built from 1905 to 1935 along Saltholmsgatan leading up to Saltholmen. The villas vary in building style: Art Nouveau, romantic nationalism and classicism. There is a waiting station with a roof at the tram stop Roddföreningen.

== Tram ==
The decision to build a railway instead of a tramway was made because the area of the railway was located outside the city of Gothenburg, but was later included in the city. The railway had been trafficked with trams, but around 1972 it was reclassified as a tramway. Nowadays it serves at the end stop for line 11 and line 9 in summer. A minor tram depot was also constructed at Saltholmen. The building still remains, but has not been used as a tram depot for years.

== Warm bathing area ==
The warm bathing area was constructed by Långedrag AB and taken into use in 1908 by colonel Viktor Balck and was used to select the national team for swimming at the 1908 Summer Olympics. It was equipped with 2 x 100 volt direct current. The area was dismantled in 1976, but was later taken back into use until 1982. The building was disused and threatened to be dismantled in 1986, but was later rescued.

== Cold bathing area ==
The cold bathing area in Saltholmen was built in 1908 by Viktor Balck and the swimming team. Since 1976 it has been operated by the Kallbadhusets Vänner Saltholmen organisation which has 800 members. There are three nude bathing areas: one for men, one for women and one for mixed-sex bathing.

== Boat harbours ==
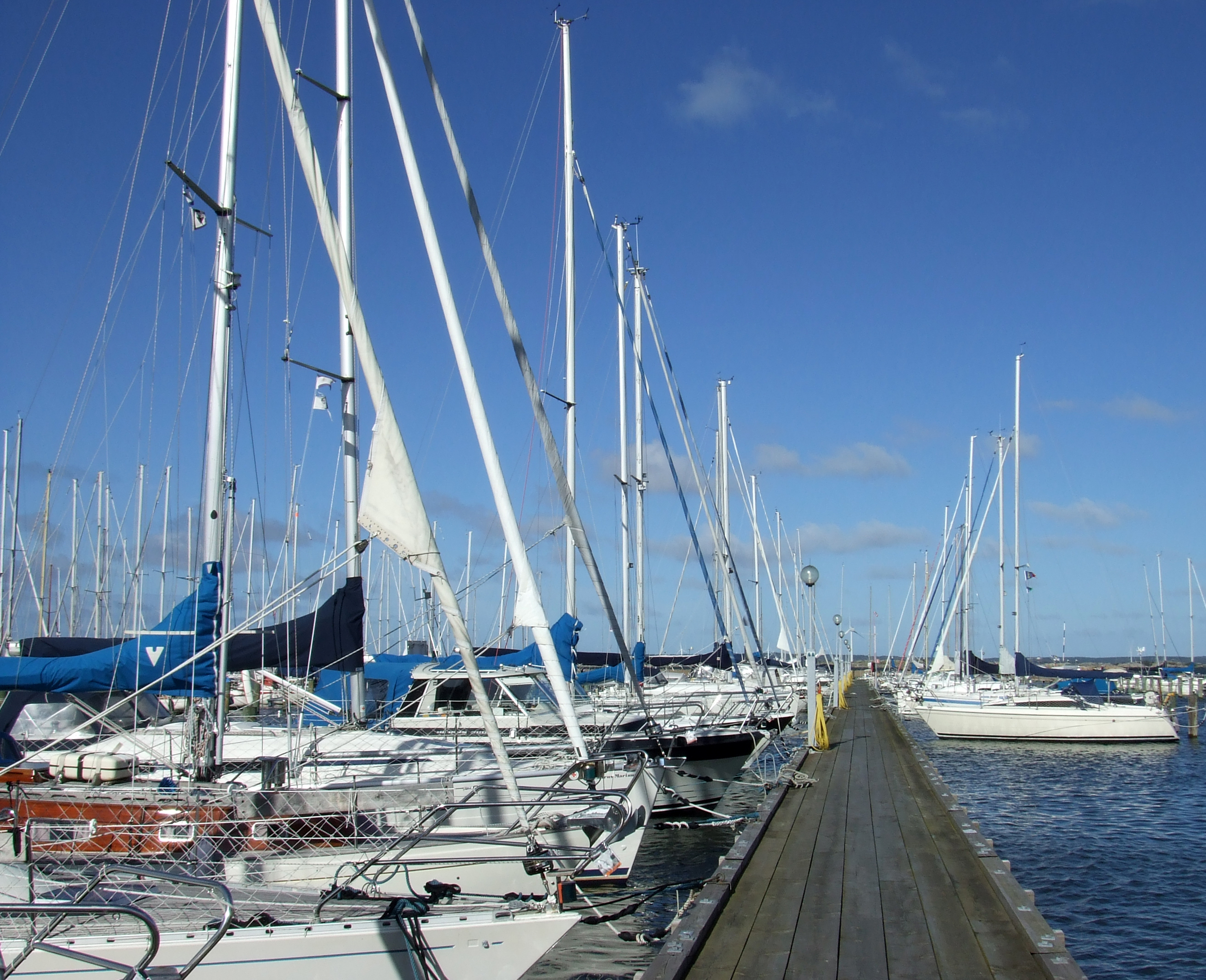
Boats at Saltholmen boat harbour.

There are several boat harbours in Saltholmen, with 1055 boat places and 200 winter parking places in total, which are operated by the municipal company Grefab.

== Archipelago ships ==
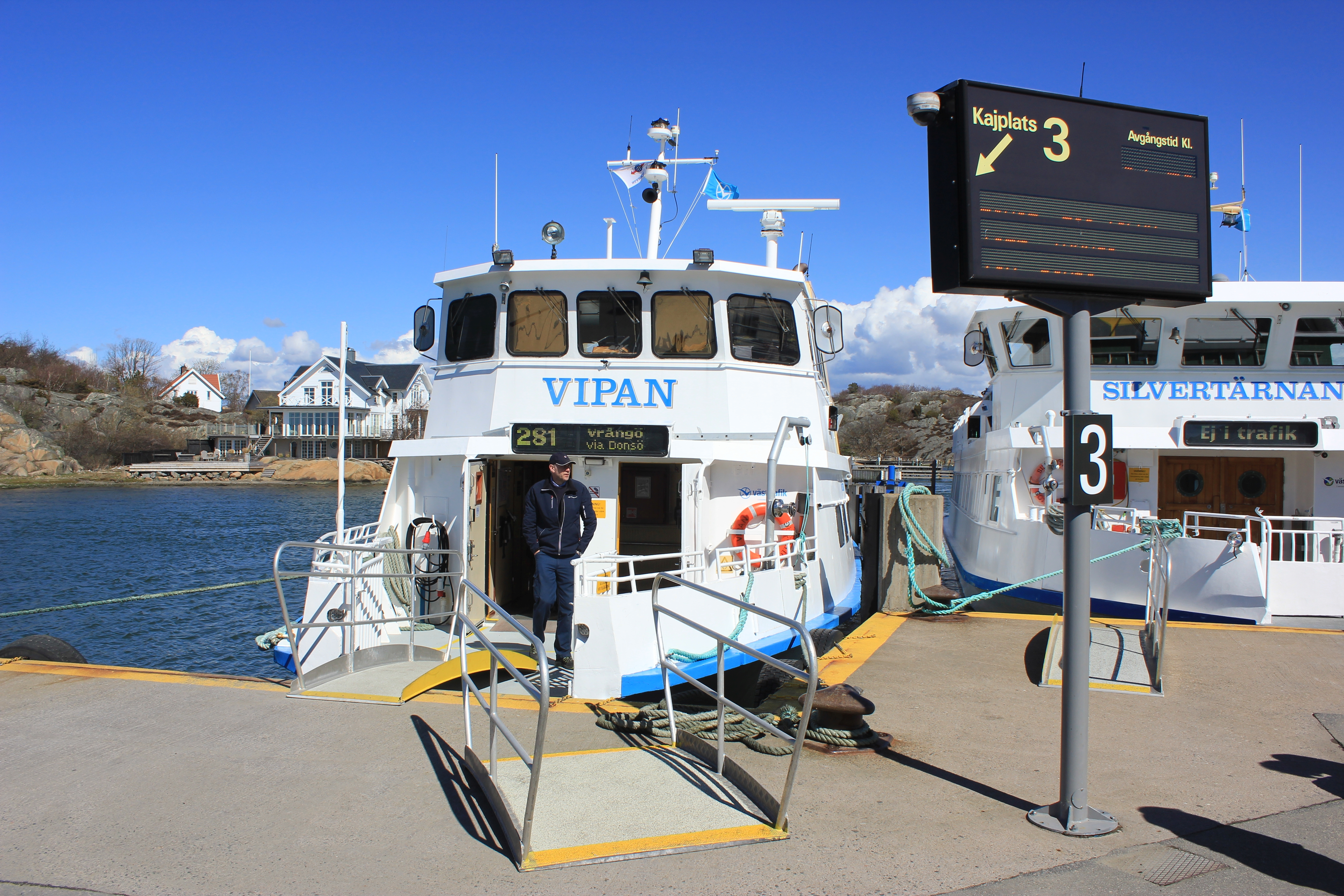
The archipelago ships Vipan and Silvertärnan at Saltholmen harbour.

Saltholmen is also a harbour for the archipelago ships to the Gothenburg archipelago. These used to go all the way to Stenpiren in central Gothenburg, and there is discussion whether to reinstate the connection. The cargo traffic has been moved to the Fiskebäck harbour because of lack of space at Saltholmen (trash cargo is transported to the Önnered pier). Construction for the use of this traffic started in Fiskebäck harbour in October 2006.

On 24 June 1983 the so-called Saltholmen murder happened on the cliffs of Saltholmen.

== Sources ==
=== Bibliography ===
- Fasth, Agneta (1985). Saltholmens kallbad. Göteborg: Tre böcker. Libris 7748944. ISBN 91-85414-33-6.
- Lönnroth Gudrun, ed. (2000). Kulturhistoriskt värdefull bebyggelse i Göteborg: ett program för bevarande. D. 2. Göteborg: Stadsbyggnadskontoret. pp. 177-183. Libris 2901637. ISBN 91-89088-05-0.
- Rudolf, Karl (1980). Långedrag: några drag ur dess historia samt utveckling under åren 1858-1943. Västra Frölunda: Västra Frölunda hembygdsfören. Libris 336095. ISBN 91-89088-05-0.
