= Älvsnabben (ferry line) =

Ferry service in Gothenburg, Sweden

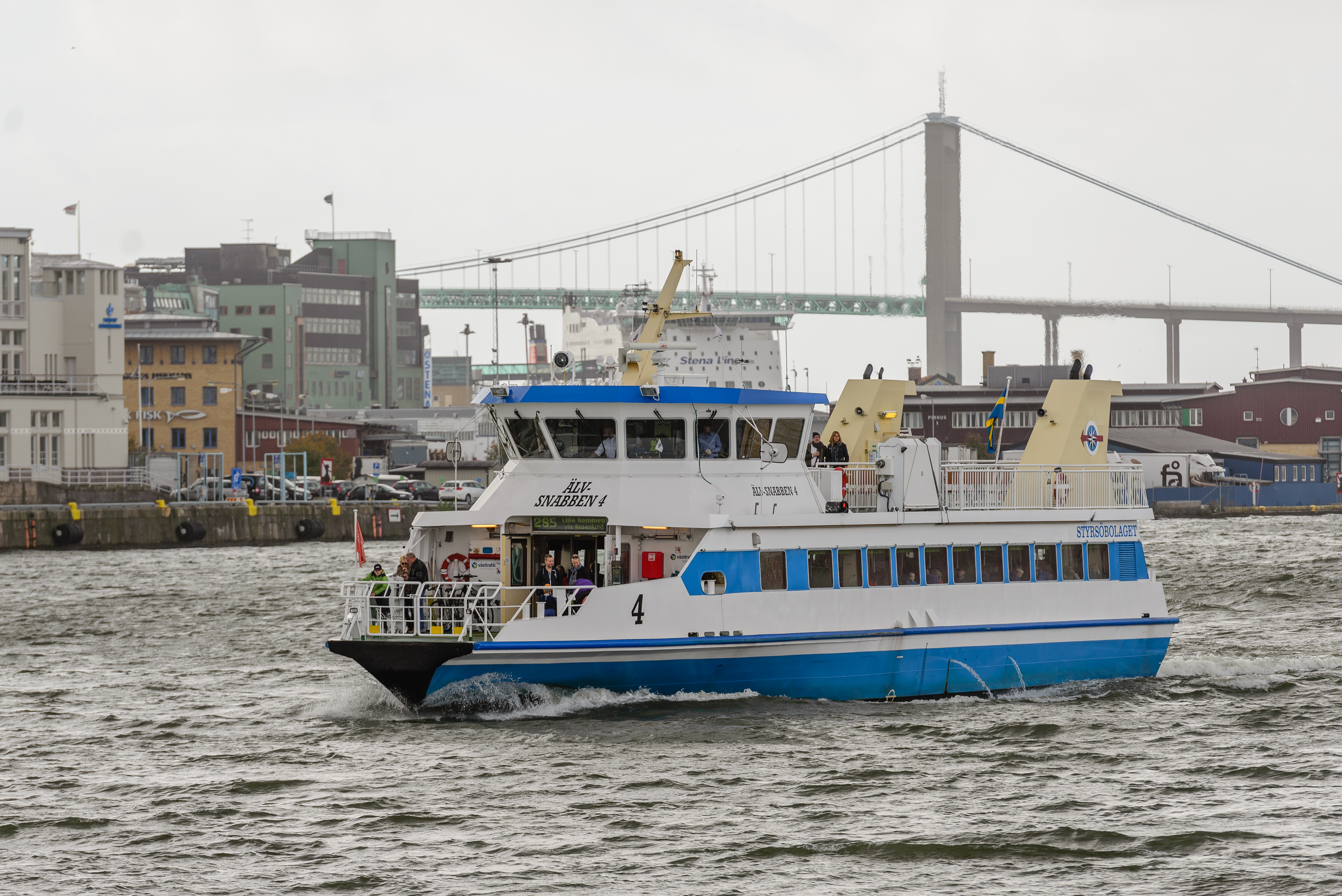
Älvsnabben 4 with Älvsborgsbron in the background.

Älvsnabben is a ferry line trafficking on the river Göta älv in Gothenburg, Sweden since the 1990s. Älvsnabben is operated by Styrsöbolaget on a commission from Västtrafik, and has the time table number 285.

== History ==
Älvsnabben started traffic on 2 May 1990 with the ships Älvsnabben 1 and Älvsnabben 2, with a capacity of 54 passengers each. On parts of their route from Lilla Bommen to Eriksberg, the end stop at the time, the maximum speed allowed for the ships was 18 knots. In 1991 the route was extended to Klippan. As the traffic increased, the ships were upgraded to hold 100 passengers and the ship Disa was introduced as an additional ship. In 1993 the traffic was complemented with the ship Älvsnabben 3. The ships Älvsnabben 4 and Älvsnabben 5 were taken into traffic from 1994 to 1995, at which time the two first ships were sold.

== Routes ==
Älvsnabben connects both sides of Göta älv on a zig-zag pattern between the mainland and Hisingen on the part between the Götaälvbron and Älvsborgsbron bridges. The stops are Lilla Bommen, Stenpiren (formerly called Rosenlund), Lindholmspiren, Slottsberget and Klippan.

== Älvsnabbare ==
There is even an extra line called "Älvsnabbare" (Note: The name is a pun: "älv-snabben" can be read in Swedish as "the fast one of the river", so "älv-snabbaren" follows as "the faster one of the river".), with the time table number 286, trafficking between Stenpiren and Lindholmspiren on weekdays. This line departs every 6 minutes at peak time and is free of charge.

Älvsnabbare started traffic in 2001 and has been free of charge since spring 2011, as the municipality of Gothenburg pays for all costs on the line.

== Ships ==
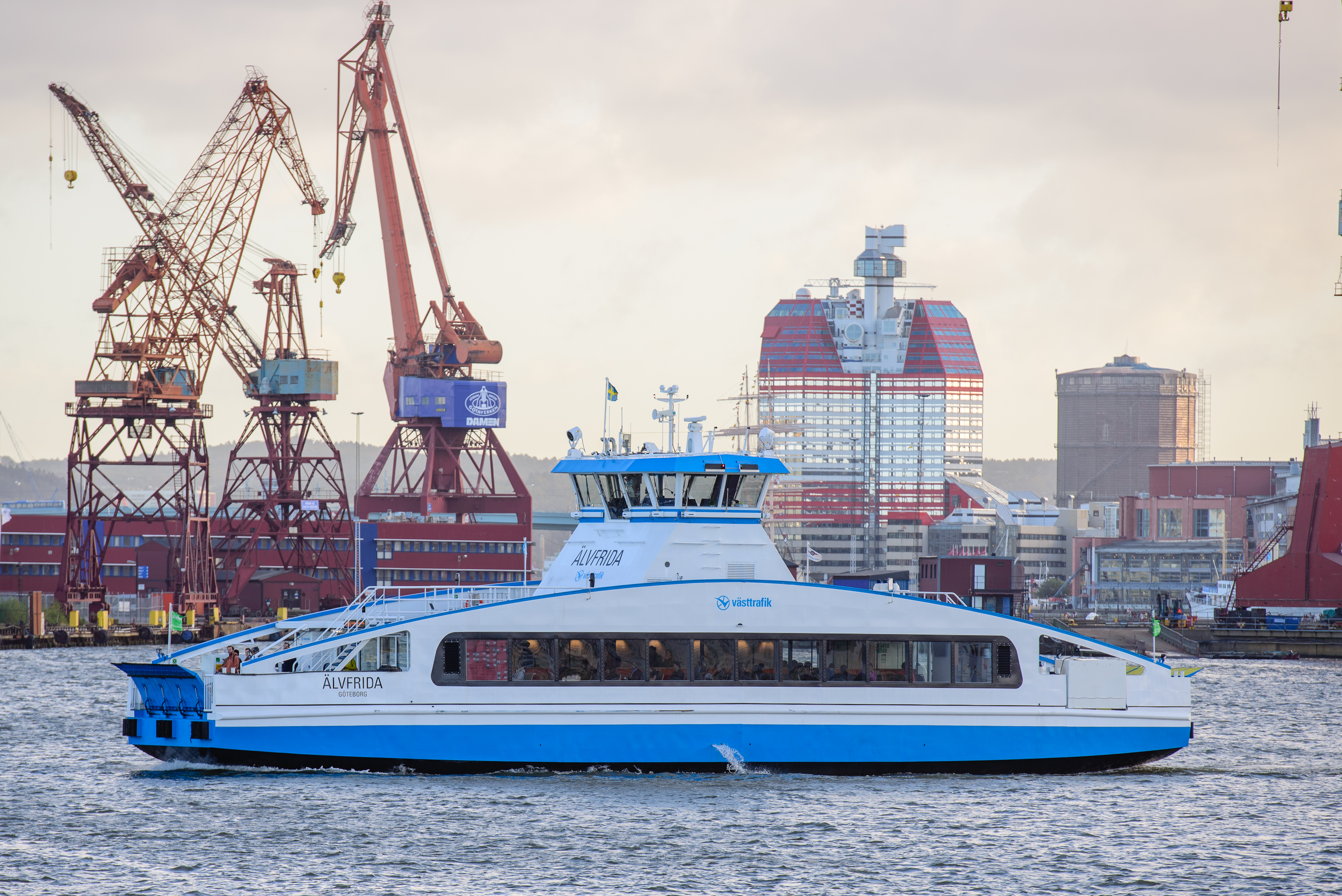
Älvfrida

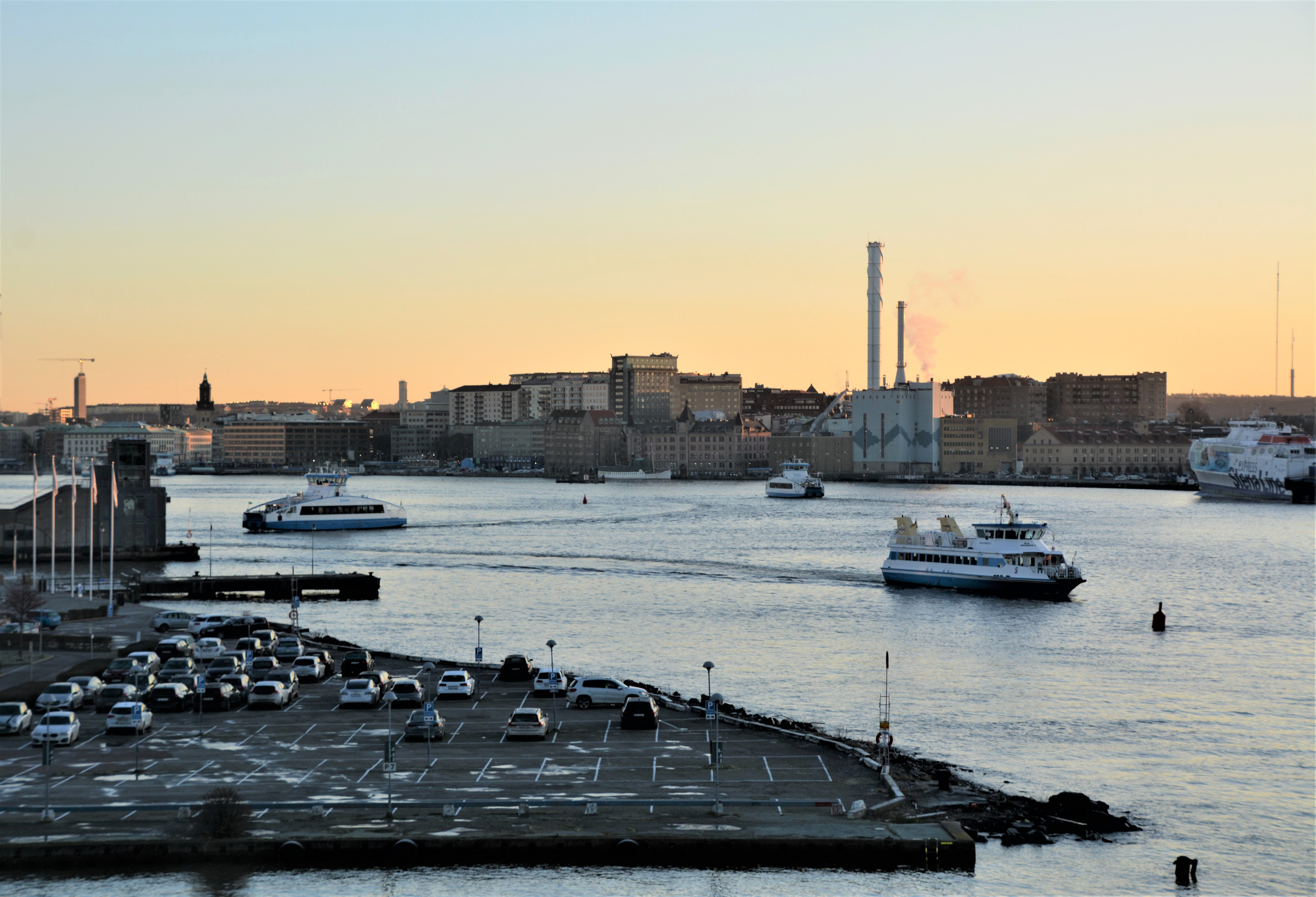
The ships Elvy, Älvfrida and Älvsnabben travelling to and from Lindholmspiren on a December morning in 2019.

Älvsnabben is trafficked by the ships Älvsnabben 4 and Älvsnabben 5, with Älvsnabben 3 serving as a reserve ship. Älvsnabbare is trafficked by the ships Älveli, Älvfrida and Älv-Vira.

- Älvsnabben 3: 298 passengers, 134 sitting places.
- Älvsnabben 4: 448 passengers, 158 sitting places in the saloon.
- Älvsnabben 5: 448 passengers, 158 sitting places in the saloon.
- Skarven: 298 passengers, 195 sitting places in the saloons.
- Älv-Vira: 300 passengers, 34 sitting places.
- Älveli: 298 passengers, 80 bicycles.
- Älvfrida: 298 passengers, 80 bicycles.
- Elvy, electricity hybrid ferry with a capacity of four hours of power. 300 passengers and 80 bicycles.

In 2015 two new ships were taken into traffic for Älvsnabbare, Älveli and Älvfrida, owned by Västtrafik, and in 2019 the electricity hybrid ferry Elvy. The ship has a capacity of 298 passengers and 80 bicycles in a saloon throughout the ship, so they can avoid turning around after disembarking. They have a maximum speed of 11 knots which is also the maximum speed for ships on Göta älv. They are both equipped with diesel-electrical machinery and with possibility to operate partly or wholly under electrical power after modification.
