= Transdermal analgesic patch =

Medicated adhesive patch

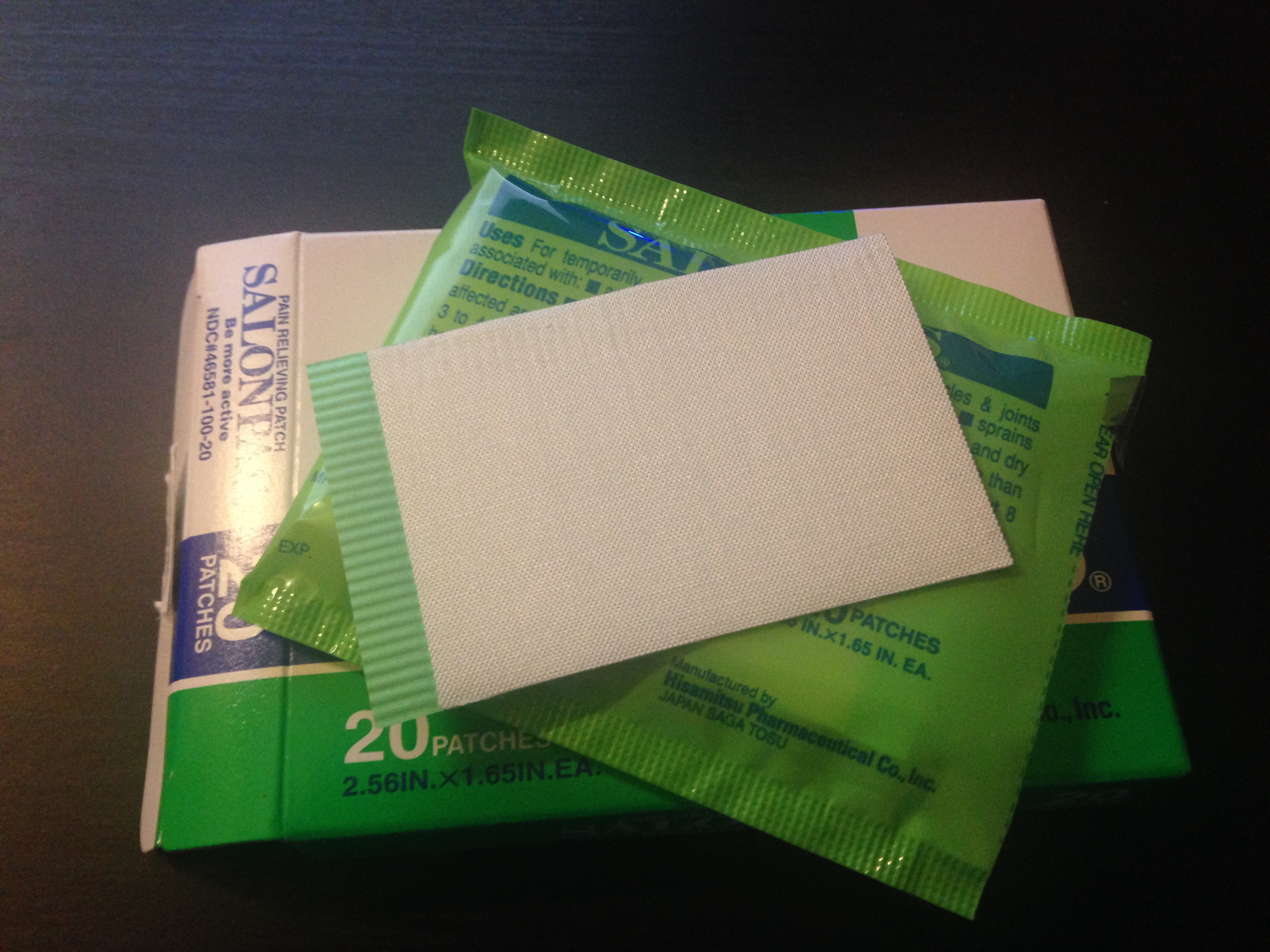
Salonpas brand analgesic patches

A transdermal analgesic or pain relief patch is a medicated adhesive patch used to relieve minor to severe pain. There are many types of analgesic patches based on the main ingredients in the patches. These include patches containing counterirritants, which are used to treat mild to moderate pain, and patches containing opioids such as buprenorphine and fentanyl, used to relieve moderate to severe pain. Fentanyl is often used for opioid-tolerant patients. Nitroglycerin, also known as glyceryl trinitrate (GTN), a medication used for heart failure, high blood pressure, anal fissures, painful periods, and to treat and prevent chest pain, can also be found in patches. Beyond these are patches that contain drugs such as diclofenac and lidocaine and various other drugs. The main purpose of transdermal analgesic patches is to administer drugs in a more viable way to patients, as opposed to oral consumption or intravenous administration such as an injection.

== Counterirritant patches ==
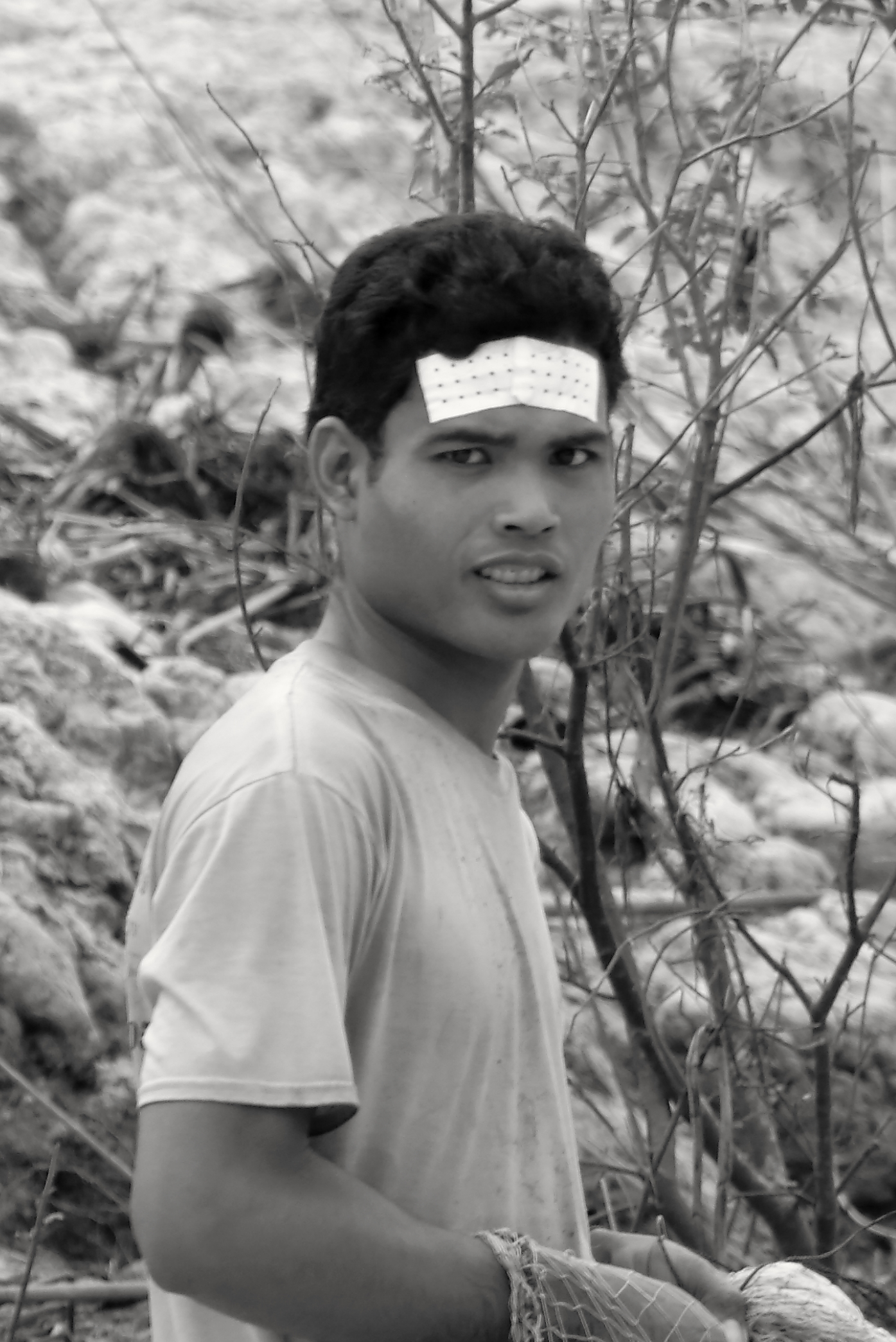
A fisherman with two counterirritant patches on his forehead, on the coast of Tonlé Sap, Cambodia.

Counterirritant patches contain ingredients such as capsaicin, methyl salicylate, camphor, or menthol, which are thought to mask pain signals by causing other sensations (itching, warmth, or cooling) in the areas they are applied to. In the United States, patches sold under the brand name Salonpas are approved by the Food and Drug Administration under a New Drug Application (NDA) for the treatment of mild to moderate pain caused by soft tissue injury (e.g., strains, sprains), arthritis, or backache. While Salonpas patches may provide some relief, the effects are not strong and the evidence supporting their efficacy is weak.

Other products, including Bengay and Mentholatum, which are not covered by NDA, indicate relief of minor pain. Counterirritant patches are sold over-the-counter and do not require a prescription. Other over-the-counter products marketed for the relief of minor injury or arthritis pain include Absorbine Jr. Pain Relief, Excedrin Cooling Pads, and Icy Hot Patches.

In Japan, Salonpas, produced by Hisamitsu Pharmaceutical, remains a popular brand. Other manufacturers, including Yutoku Pharmaceutical, SS Pharmaceutical, and Suzuki Nippondo also produce similar over-the-counter patches containing methyl salicylate or glycol salicylate.

In Australia, patches sold under the brand names Eco Pain and Dencorub are approved by the Therapeutic Goods Administration and listed on the Australian Register for Therapeutic Goods (ARTG) as a Class 1 Medical Device. They are approved for sale over-the-counter for the treatment of mild pain caused by soft tissue injury (e.g., strains, sprains), arthritis, or backache.

== Fentanyl patches ==
Fentanyl transdermal patches are sold under the brand name Duragesic or as generic equivalents. Fentanyl is an opioid with rapid onset of pain relief; it is often used to treat breakthrough pain. Fentanyl patches release fentanyl through the skin and may provide pain relief for up to 72 hours.

Several deaths or life-threatening overdoses have been linked to misuse of fentanyl patches. Fentanyl patches are indicated only for patients with moderate to severe chronic pain who have been taking regular narcotic pain medication for more than a week and who are considered opioid-tolerant. Overdose can occur when patients use more patches than prescribed, change the patches too frequently, or expose the patches to extreme heat.

== Diclofenac patches ==
Diclofenac is the active ingredient in patches like Flector. Diclofenac is a non-steroidal anti-inflammatory drug that is commonly used to reduce symptoms in soft-tissue injuries, sports injuries, or osteoarthritic knee injuries. The patches have shown to reduce symptoms that are found with oral diclofenac and are proven to reduce pain and stiffness. There may be minor side effects like redness or rash at the site of the patch.

== Lidocaine patches ==
Lidocaine is the active ingredient in patches such as Lidoderm. The lidocaine patch is proven to reduce acute or short-term pain after surgeries or procedures at rest. There has been no proven decreased opioid use from lidocaine patches. There has been no research regarding specific procedures and the effects of transdermal lidocaine, but the efficacy of lidocaine is considered minor.

== History ==
Transdermal drug delivery was influenced by topical drug delivery. Sherman Kramer and Dale Wurster, his teacher, were both based in pharmacology and are credited with the beginning stages of transdermal patch delivery in 1961. By attaching a diffusion cell to the volunteers and monitoring their levels of the drug administered, it was discovered that the levels of the drug could be affected by the absorption of the skin and the diffusion area of the patch. 10 years later, Alejandro Zaffaroni filed a patent for transdermal drug delivery through a rate-controlling membrane. Arnold Beckett, a British pharmacist, held experiments with a patch system that were studied and proven to maintain steady blood levels through administration of the drug. These discoveries laid the foundation for transdermal patch systems and individual research with specific drugs for transdermal patch systems followed.

== See also ==
Manufacturers

- Alza Corporation
- Hisamitsu Pharmaceutical
- The Mentholatum Company, Inc.
- Novartis
- W.F. Young, Inc.

Products

- Deep Heat (Heat rub)
- Heat rub
- IcyHot
- Tiger Balm
- Eco Pain
