= Patent medicine =

Medicine sold regardless of effectiveness

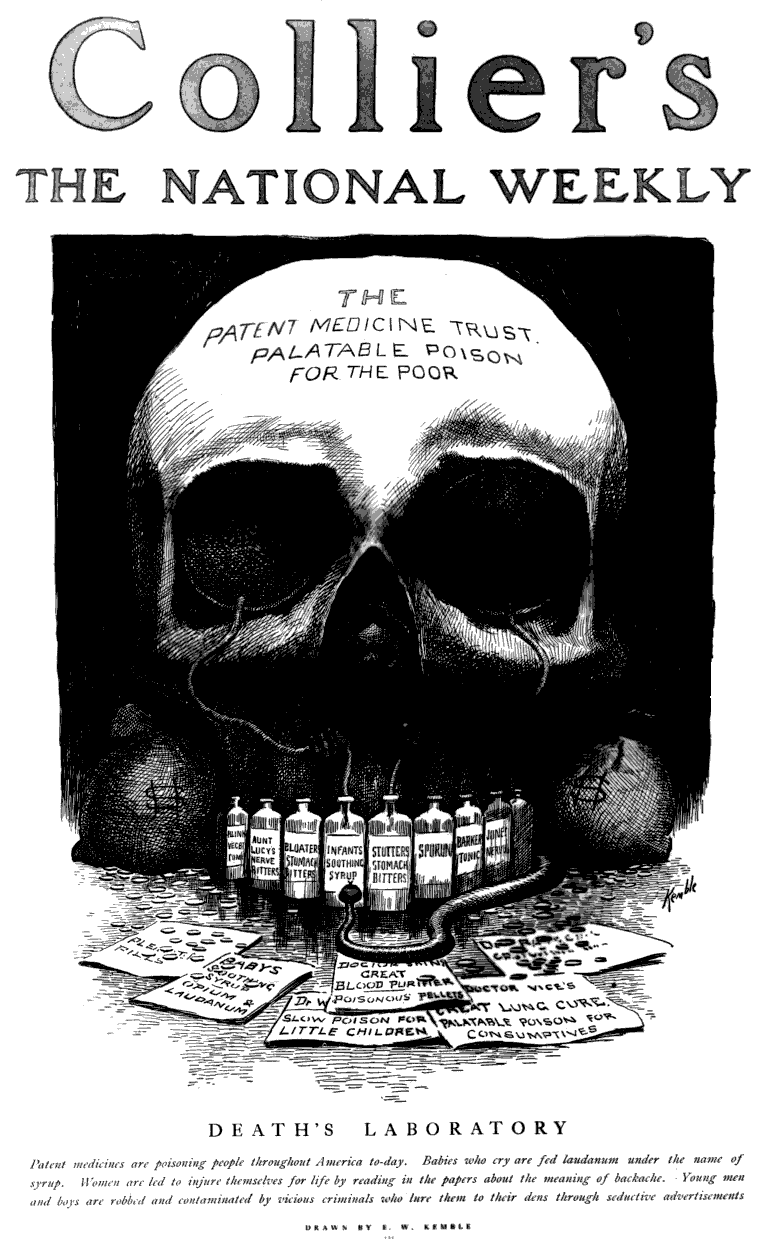
E. W. Kemble's "Death's Laboratory" on the cover of the 3 June 1905 edition of Collier's

A patent medicine (sometimes called a proprietary medicine) is a non-prescription medicine or medicinal preparation that is typically protected and advertised by a trademark and trade name, and – often falsely – claimed to be effective against minor disorders and symptoms, as opposed to a prescription drug that could be obtained only through a pharmacist, usually with a doctor's prescription, and whose composition was openly disclosed. Many current over-the-counter drugs were once obtainable only by prescription and thus are not patent medicines.

The ingredients of patent medicines are incompletely disclosed. Antiseptics, analgesics, some sedatives, laxatives, antacids, cold and cough medicines, and various skin preparations are included in the group. The safety and effectiveness of patent medicines and their sale is controlled and regulated by the Food and Drug Administration (FDA) in the United States and corresponding authorities in other countries.

The term is sometimes still used to describe quack remedies of unproven effectiveness and questionable safety sold especially by peddlers in past centuries, who often also called them elixirs, tonics, or liniments. Current examples of quack remedies are sometimes called nostrums or panaceas, but easier-to-understand terms like scam, cure-all, or pseudoscience are more common.

Patent medicines were one of the first major product categories that the advertising industry promoted; patent medicine promoters pioneered many advertising and sales techniques that were later used for other products. Patent medicine advertising often marketed products as being medical panaceas (or at least a treatment for many diseases) and emphasized exotic ingredients and endorsements from purported experts or celebrities, which may or may not have been true. Patent medicine sales were increasingly constricted in the United States in the early 20th century as the FDA and Federal Trade Commission added ever-increasing regulations to prevent fraud, unintentional poisoning and deceptive advertising. Sellers of liniments, claimed to contain snake oil and falsely promoted as a cure-all, made the snake oil salesman a lasting symbol for a charlatan.

== Origins and advertising ==
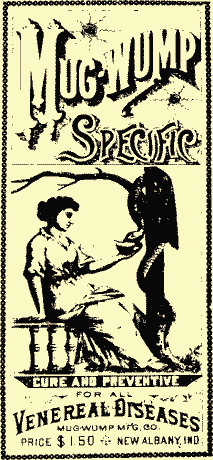
Mug-wump, "for all venereal diseases"

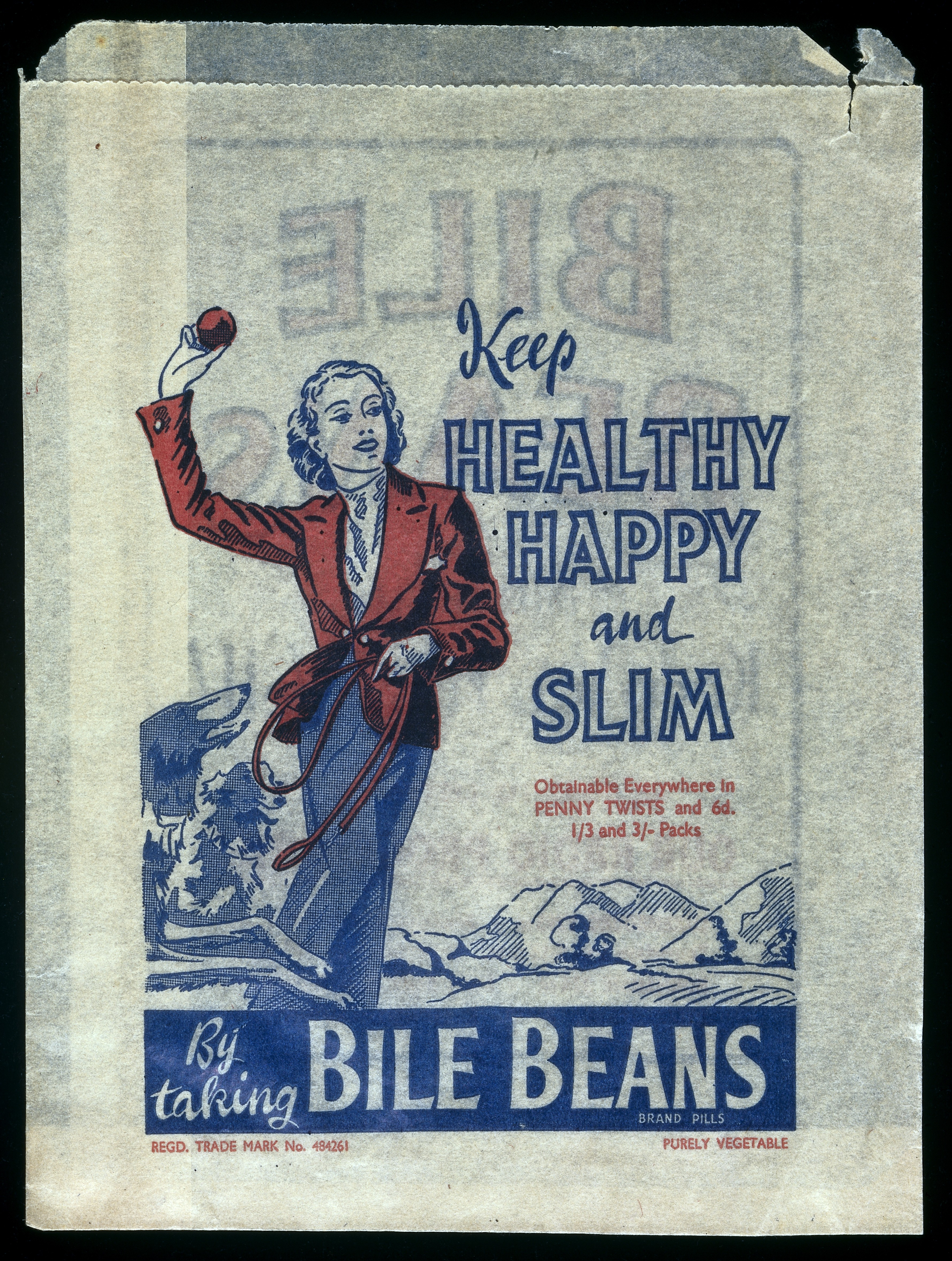
Bile Beans brand pills

The phrase "patent medicine" comes from the late 17th century marketing of medical elixirs, when those who found favour with royalty were issued letters patent authorising the use of the royal endorsement in advertising. Few if any of the nostrums were actually patented; chemical patents did not come into use in the United States until 1925. Furthermore, patenting one of these remedies would have meant publicly disclosing its ingredients, which most promoters sought to avoid.

Advertisement kept these patent medications in the public eye and gave the belief that no disease was beyond the cure of patent medication. "The medicine man's key task quickly became not production but sales, the job of persuading ailing citizens to buy his particular brand from among the hundreds offered. Whether unscrupulous or self-deluded, nostrum makers set about this task with cleverness and zeal."

Instead, the compounders of such nostrums used a primitive version of branding to distinguish their products from the crowd of their competitors. Many extant brands from the era live on today in brands such as Luden's cough drops, Lydia E. Pinkham's vegetable compound for women, Fletcher's Castoria and even Angostura bitters, which was once marketed as a stomachic. Though sold at high prices, many of these products were made from cheap ingredients. Their composition was well known within the pharmacy trade, and druggists manufactured and sold (for a slightly lower price) medicines of almost identical composition. To protect profits, the branded medicine advertisements emphasized brand names and urged the public to "accept no substitutes".

At least in the earliest days, the history of patent medicines is coextensive with scientific medicine. Empirical medicine, and the beginning of the application of the scientific method to medicine, began to yield a few orthodoxly acceptable herbal and mineral drugs for the physician's arsenal. These few remedies, on the other hand, were inadequate to cover the bewildering variety of diseases and symptoms. Beyond these patches of evidence-based application, people used other methods, such as occultism; the "doctrine of signatures" – essentially, the application of sympathetic magic to pharmacology – held that nature had hidden clues to medically effective drugs in their resemblances to the human body and its parts. This led medical men to hope that, say, walnut shells might be good for skull fractures. Homeopathy, the notion that illness is binary and can be treated by ingredients that cause the same symptoms in healthy people, was another outgrowth of this early era of medicine. Given the state of the pharmacopoeia, and patients' demands for something to take, physicians began making "blunderbuss" concoctions of various drugs, proven and unproven. These concoctions were the ancestors of the several nostrums.

Touting these nostrums was one of the first major projects of the advertising industry. The marketing of nostrums under implausible claims has a long history. In Henry Fielding's Tom Jones (1749), allusion is made to the sale of medical compounds claimed to be universal panaceas:

As to Squire Western, he was seldom out of the sick-room, unless when he was engaged either in the field or over his bottle. Nay, he would sometimes retire hither to take his beer, and it was not without difficulty that he was prevented from forcing Jones to take his beer too: for no quack ever held his nostrum to be a more general panacea than he did this; which, he said, had more virtue in it than was in all the physic in an apothecary's shop.

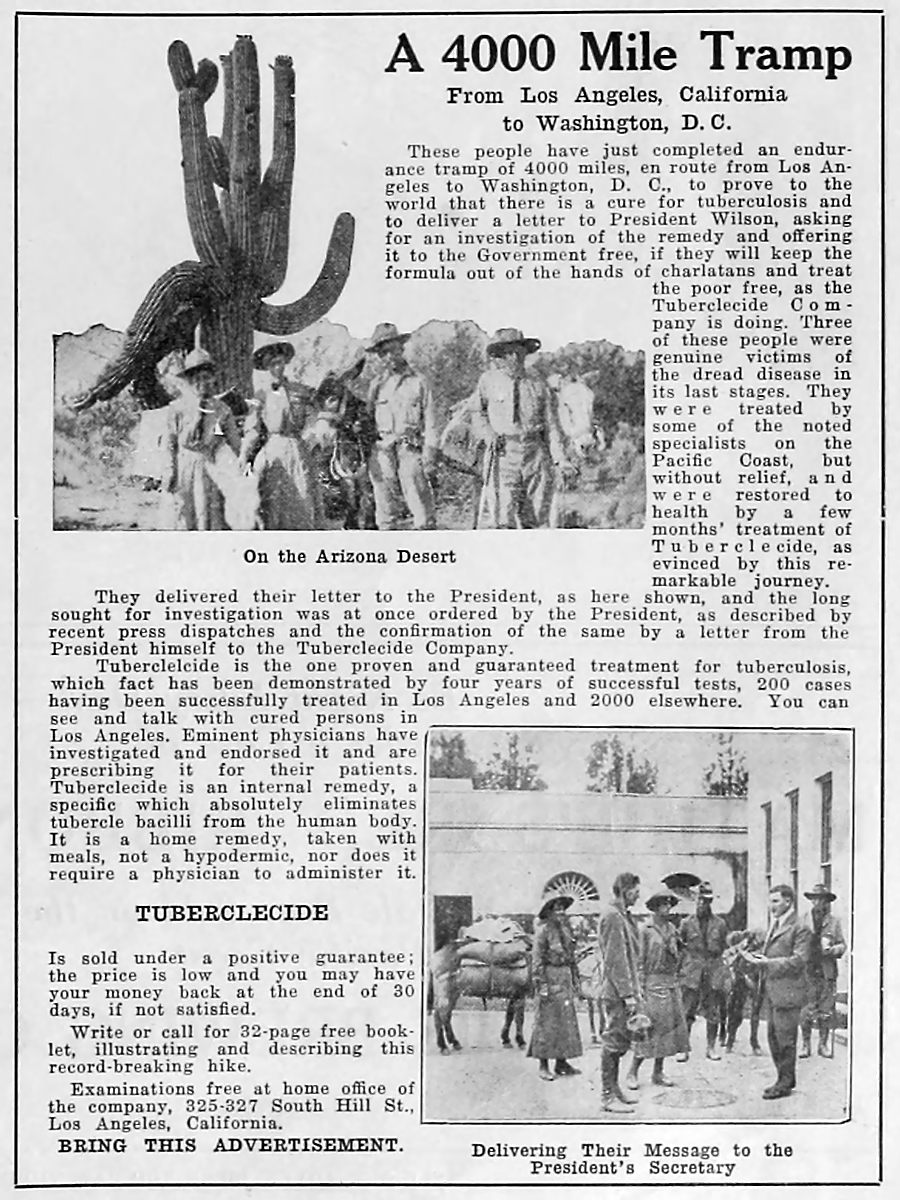
1914 advertisement implying approval by the U.S. government

Within the English-speaking world, patent medicines are as old as journalism. "Anderson's Pills" were first made in England in the 1630s; the recipe was allegedly learned in Venice by a Scot who claimed to be physician to King Charles I. Daffy's Elixir was invented about 1647 and remained popular in Britain and the US until the late 19th century. The use of "letters patent" to obtain exclusive marketing rights to certain labelled formulas and their marketing fueled the circulation of early newspapers. The use of invented names began early. In 1726 a patent was granted to the makers of Dr. Bateman's Pectoral Drops; at least on the documents that survive, there was no Dr. Bateman. This was the enterprise of a Benjamin Okell and a group of promoters who owned a warehouse and a print shop to promote the product.

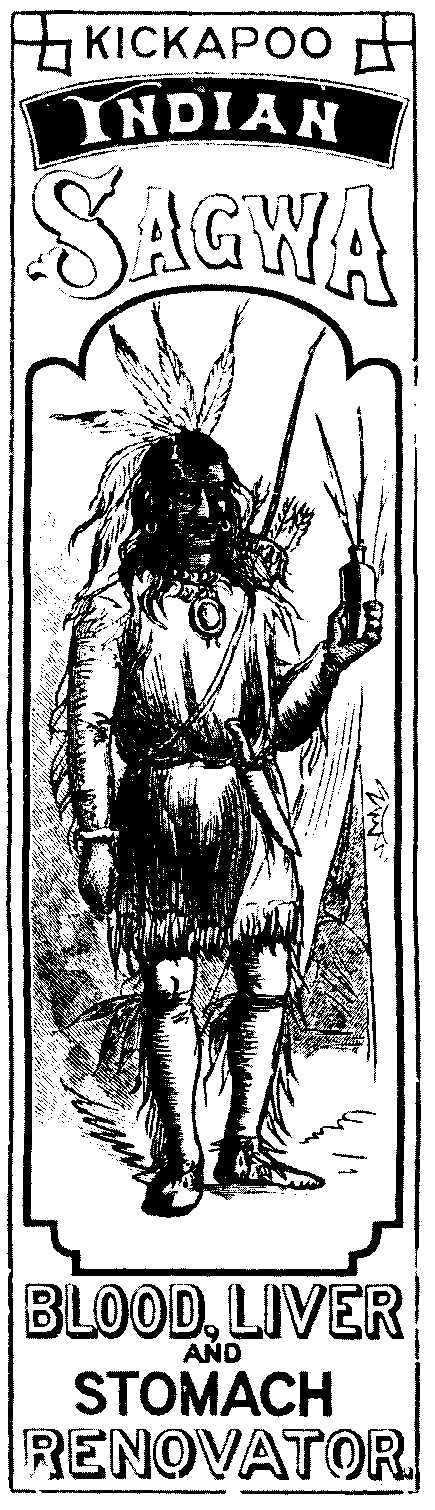
Kickapoo Indian "Sagwa", sold at medicine shows

Several American institutions owe their existence to the patent medicine industry, most notably the older almanacs which were originally given away as promotional items by patent medicine manufacturers. Perhaps the most successful industry that grew up out of the business of patent medicine advertisements, though, was founded by William H. Gannett in Maine in 1866. There were few circulating newspapers in Maine in that era, so Gannett founded a periodical, Comfort, whose chief purpose was to propose the merits of Oxien, a nostrum made from the fruit of the baobab tree, to the rural folks of Maine. Gannett's newspaper became the first publication of Guy Gannett Communications, which eventually owned four Maine dailies and several television stations. The family-owned firm is unrelated to the Gannett which publishes USA Today.

An early pioneer in the use of advertising to promote patent medicine was New York businessman Benjamin Brandreth, whose "Vegetable Universal Pill" eventually became one of the best-selling patent medicines in the United States. "...A congressional committee in 1849 reported that Brandreth was the nation's largest proprietary advertiser... Between 1862 and 1863 Brandreth's average annual gross income surpassed $600,000..." For 50 years Brandreth's name was a household word in the United States. Indeed, the Brandreth pills were so well known they received mention in Herman Melville's classic novel Moby-Dick.

Another publicity method – undertaken mostly by smaller firms – was the medicine show, a traveling circus of sorts that offered vaudeville-style entertainments on a small scale and climaxed in a pitch for some sort of cure-all nostrum. "Muscle man" acts were especially popular on these tours, for this enabled the salesman to tout the physical vigour the product supposedly offered. The showmen frequently employed shills, who stepped forward from the crowd to offer "unsolicited" testimonials about the benefits of the medicine. Often, the nostrum was manufactured and bottled in the wagon in which the show travelled. The Kickapoo Indian Medicine Company became one of the largest and most successful medicine show operators. Their shows had an American Indian or Wild West theme and employed many American Indians as spokespeople such as the Modoc War scout Donald McKay. The "medicine show" lived on in American folklore and Western movies long after they vanished from public life.

== In popular culture ==
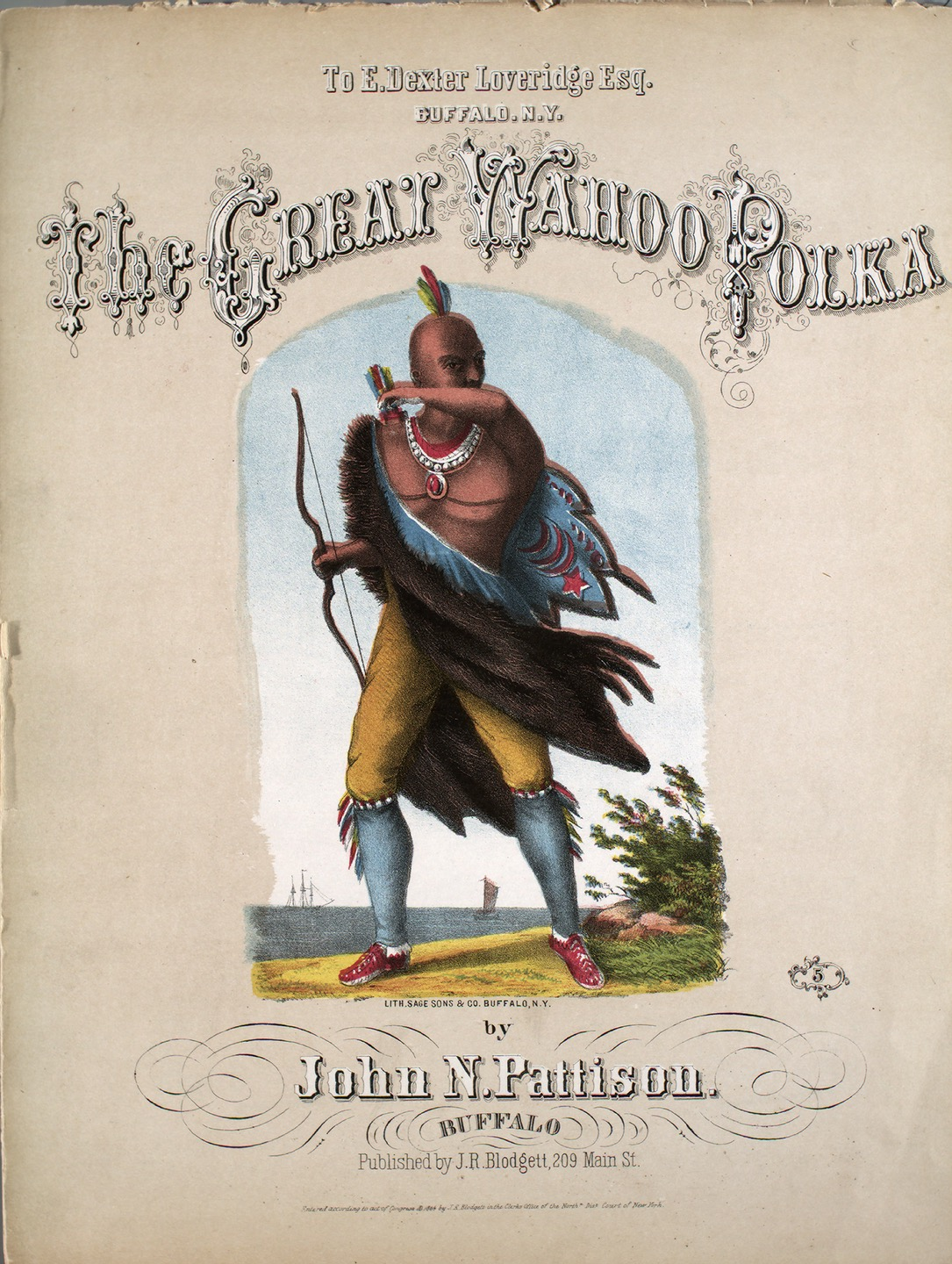
The Great Wahoo Polka (1864)

Patent medicines were often praised or parodied in popular culture. An example is "The Great Wahoo Polka" by J.N. Pattison, a speedy dance jig in praise of a family of products known as "Wahoo Bitters". The remedy's active ingredient was the purgative Euonymus atropurpureus, commonly known as Wahoo.

Walt Disney produced a comic "Mickey Mouse and the Medicine Man" about Mickey and Pluto discovering a stimulant patent drug "Peppo", which they sold in Africa.

== Ingredients and their uses ==
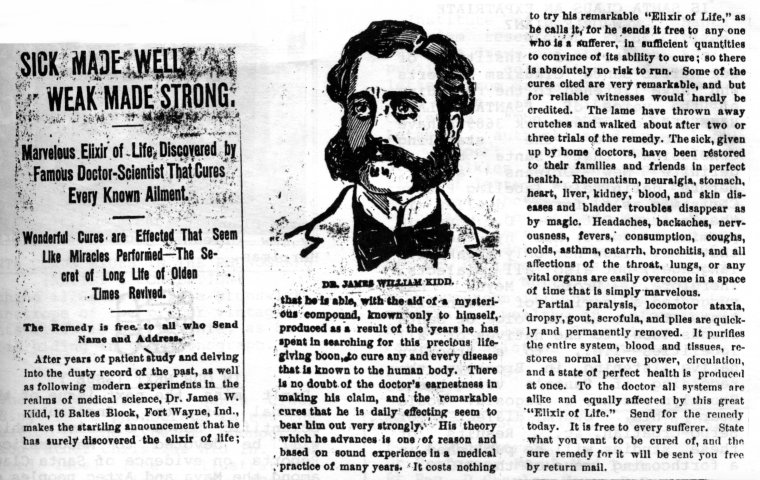
Sick Made Well, Weak Made Strong, Elixir of Life, etc. Typical ad for patent medicine

=== Supposed ingredients ===
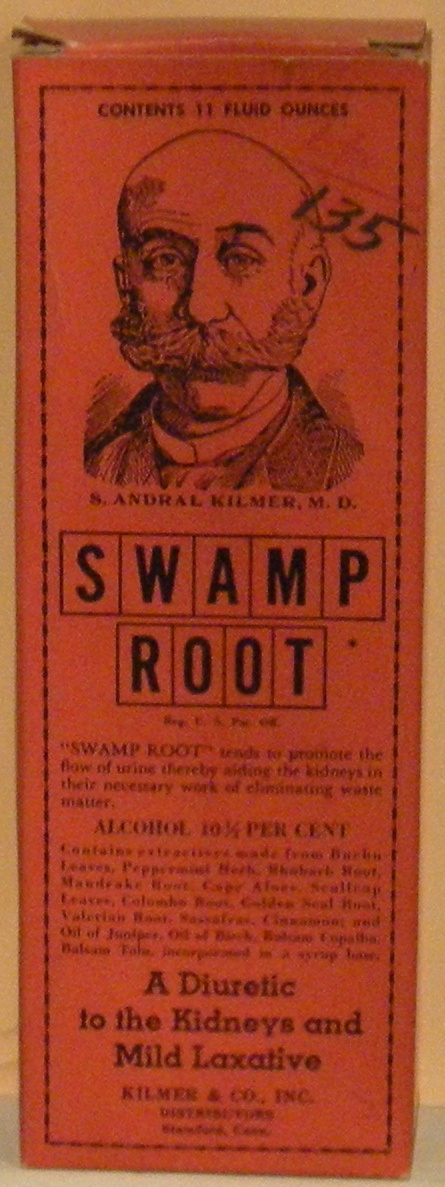
Kilmer's Swamp Root

Many promoters desired to lend their preparations a sense of exoticism and mystery. Unlikely ingredients such as the baobab fruit in Oxien were a recurring theme. A famous patent medicine of the period was "Dr. Kilmer's Swamp Root"; unspecified roots found in swamps had remarkable effects on the kidneys, according to its literature.

Native American themes were also useful: natives, imagined to be noble savages, were thought to be in tune with nature and heirs to a body of traditional lore about herbal remedies and natural cures. One example of this approach from the period was Kickapoo Indian Sagwa, a product of the Kickapoo Indian Medicine Company of Connecticut (completely unrelated to the Kickapoo Tribe of Oklahoma), supposedly based on a Native American recipe. This nostrum was the inspiration for Al Capp's "Kickapoo Joy Juice", featured in the comic strip, Li'l Abner.

Another benefit of claiming traditional native origins was that it was nearly impossible to disprove. A good example of this is the story behind Dr. Morse's Indian Root Pills, which was the mainstay of the Comstock patent medicine business. According to text on a wrapper on every box of pills, Dr. Morse was a trained medical doctor who enriched his education by travelling extensively throughout Asia, Africa, and Europe. He supposedly lived among the American Indians for three years, during which time he discovered the healing properties of various plants and roots that he eventually combined into Dr. Morse's Indian Root Pills.

Other promoters took an opposite tack from timeless herbal wisdom. Nearly any scientific discovery or exotic locale could inspire a key ingredient or principle in a patent medicine. Consumers were invited to invoke the power of electromagnetism to heal their ailments. In the 19th century, electricity and radio were scientific advances that found their way into patent medicine advertising, especially after Luigi Galvani showed that electricity influenced the muscles. Devices meant to electrify the body were sold; nostrums were compounded that purported to attract electrical energy or make the body more conductive. "Violet ray machines" were sold as rejuvenation devices, and balding men could seek solace in an "electric fez" purported to regrow hair. Albert Abrams was a well known practitioner of electrical quackery, claiming the ability to diagnose and treat diseases over long distances by radio. In 1913 the quack John R. Brinkley, calling himself an "Electro Medic Doctor", began injecting men with colored water as a virility cure, claiming it was "electric medicine from Germany". (Brinkley would go on to even greater infamy through transplanting goat testicles into men's scrotums as a virility treatment.)

Towards the end of the period, a number of radioactive medicines, containing uranium or radium, were marketed. Some of these actually contained the ingredients promised, and there were a number of tragedies among their devotees. Most notoriously, steel heir Eben McBurney Byers was a supporter of the popular radium water Radithor, developed by the medical con artist William J. A. Bailey. Byers contracted fatal radium poisoning and had to have his jaw removed in an unsuccessful attempt to save him from bone cancer after drinking nearly 1,400 bottles of Bailey's "radium water". Water irradiators were sold that promised to infuse water placed within them with radon, which was thought to be healthy at the time.

=== Actual ingredients ===
Contrary to what is often believed, some patent medicines did, in fact, deliver the promised results, albeit with very dangerous ingredients. For example, medicines advertised as "infant soothers" contained opium, then a legal drug. Those advertised as "catarrh snuff" contained cocaine, also legal. While various herbs, touted or alluded to, were talked up in the advertising, their actual effects often came from procaine extracts or grain alcohol. Those containing opiates were at least effective in relieving pain, coughs, and diarrhea, though they could result in addiction. This hazard was sufficiently well known that many were advertised as causing none of the harmful effects of opium (though many of those so advertised actually did contain opium).

Until the 20th century, alcohol was the most controversial ingredient, for it was widely recognised that the "medicines" could continue to be sold for their alleged curative properties even in prohibition states and counties. Many of the medicines were in fact liqueurs of various sorts, flavoured with herbs said to have medicinal properties. Some examples include:

- Cannabis indica, the low growing variants of cannabis with a high level of THC.
- Peruna was a famous "prohibition tonic", weighing in at around 18% grain alcohol. A nostrum known as "Jamaican ginger" was ordered to change its formula by prohibition officials. To fool a chemical test some vendors added a toxic chemical, tricresyl phosphate, an organophosphate compound that produced organophosphate-induced delayed neuropathy, a chronic nerve damage syndrome similar to that caused by certain nerve agents. Unwary imbibers suffered a form of paralysis that came to be known as jake-leg.
- Clark Stanley, the "Rattlesnake King", produced Stanley's snake oil, publicly processing rattlesnakes at the World's Columbian Exposition in Chicago. His liniment, when seized and tested by the federal government in 1917, was found to contain mineral oil, 1% fatty oil, red pepper, turpentine and camphor. This is not too unlike modern capsaicin and camphor liniments.
- The original formulation of Coca-Cola used coca leaves, an indirect source of cocaine, and was marketed as an energy rejuvenator. Unlike most patent medicines of its era, it did not contain alcohol.
- Some herbal preparations included laxatives such as senna or diuretics, to give the compounds some obvious physical effects.

When journalists and physicians began focusing on the narcotic contents of the patent medicines, some of their makers began replacing the opium tincture laudanum with acetanilide, a particularly toxic non-steroidal anti-inflammatory drug with analgesic as well as antipyretic properties that had been introduced into medical practice under the name Antifebrin by A. Cahn and P. Hepp in 1886. But this ingredient change probably killed more of the nostrum's users than the original narcotics did, since acetanilide not only alarmingly caused cyanosis due to methemoglobinemia, but was later discovered to cause liver and kidney damage.

The occasional reports of acetanilide-induced cyanosis prompted the search for less toxic aniline derivatives. Phenacetin was one such derivative; it was eventually withdrawn after it was found to be a carcinogen. After several conflicting results over the ensuing 50 years, it was ultimately established in 1948 that acetanilide was mostly metabolized to paracetamol (known in the United States as USAN: acetaminophen) in the human body, and that it was this metabolite that was responsible for its analgesic and antipyretic properties. Acetanilide is no longer used as a drug in its own right, although the success of its metabolite – paracetamol (acetaminophen) – is well known.

=== Supposed uses ===
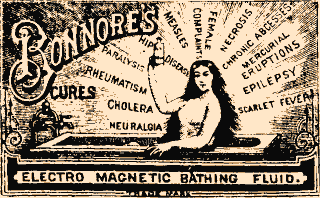
Bonnore's Electro Magnetic Bathing Fluid was claimed to help many unrelated ailments.

Patent medicines were supposedly able to cure just about everything. Nostrums were openly sold that claimed to cure or prevent venereal diseases, tuberculosis, and cancer. "Bonnore's Electro Magnetic Bathing Fluid" claimed to cure cholera, neuralgia, epilepsy, scarlet fever, necrosis, mercurial eruptions, paralysis, hip diseases, chronic abscesses, and "female complaints". "William Radam's Microbe Killer", a product sold widely on both sides of the Atlantic in the 1890s and early 1900s, had the bold claim "Cures All Diseases" prominently embossed on the front of the bottle. Ebeneezer Sibly ('Dr Sibly') in late 18th and early 19th century Britain went so far as to advertise that his "Solar Tincture" was able to "restore life in the event of sudden death", amongst other marvels.

Every manufacturer published long lists of testimonials that described their product curing all sorts of human ailments. Fortunately for both makers and users, the illnesses they claimed were cured were almost invariably self-diagnosed – and the claims of the writers to have been healed of cancer or tuberculosis by the nostrum should be considered in this light.

== 20th century ==
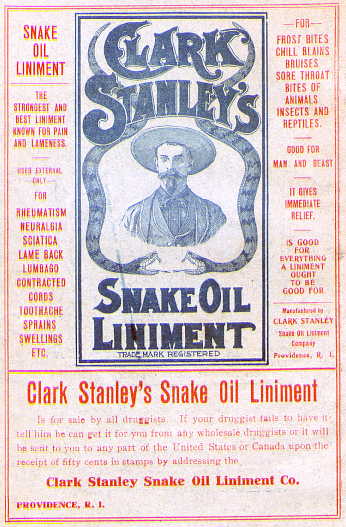
Clark Stanley's Snake Oil Liniment

Muckraker journalists and other investigators began to publicize instances of death, drug addiction, and other hazards from the compounds. In 1905, Samuel Hopkins Adams published an exposé entitled "The Great American Fraud" in Collier's Weekly that led to the passage of the first Pure Food and Drug Act in 1906. This statute did not ban the alcohol, narcotics, and stimulants in the medicines; it required them to be labeled as such, and curbed some of the more misleading, overstated, or fraudulent claims that appeared on the labels. In 1936 the statute was revised to ban them, and the United States entered a long period of ever more drastic reductions in the medications available unmediated by physicians and prescriptions. Morris Fishbein, editor of The Journal of the American Medical Association, who was active in the first half of the 20th century, based much of his career on exposing quacks and driving them out of business.

In more recent years, various herbal concoctions have been marketed as "nutritional supplements". While their advertisements are careful not to cross the line into making explicit medical claims, and often bear a disclaimer that asserts that the products have not been tested and are not intended to diagnose or treat any disease, they are nevertheless marketed as remedies of various sorts. Weight loss "while you sleep" and similar claims are frequently found on these compounds (cf., Calorad, Relacore, etc.). Despite the ban on such claims, salesmen still occasionally (and illegally) make such claims; Jim Bakker, a disgraced televangelist, sells a colloidal silver gel that he claims will cure all venereal diseases and SARS-related coronaviruses. One of the most notorious such elixirs, however, calls itself "Enzyte", widely advertised for "natural male enhancement" – that is, penis enlargement. Despite being a compound of herbs, minerals, and vitamins, Enzyte formerly promoted itself under a fake scientific name Suffragium asotas. Enzyte's makers translate this phrase as "better sex", but it is in fact ungrammatical Latin for "refuge for the dissipated".

=== Surviving consumer products ===
A horse drawn Bromo Seltzer wagon

Many brands of consumer products that date from the patent medicine era are still on the market and available today. Their ingredients may have changed from the original formulas; the claims made for the benefits they offer have typically been seriously revised, but in general at least some of them have genuine medical uses. These brands include:

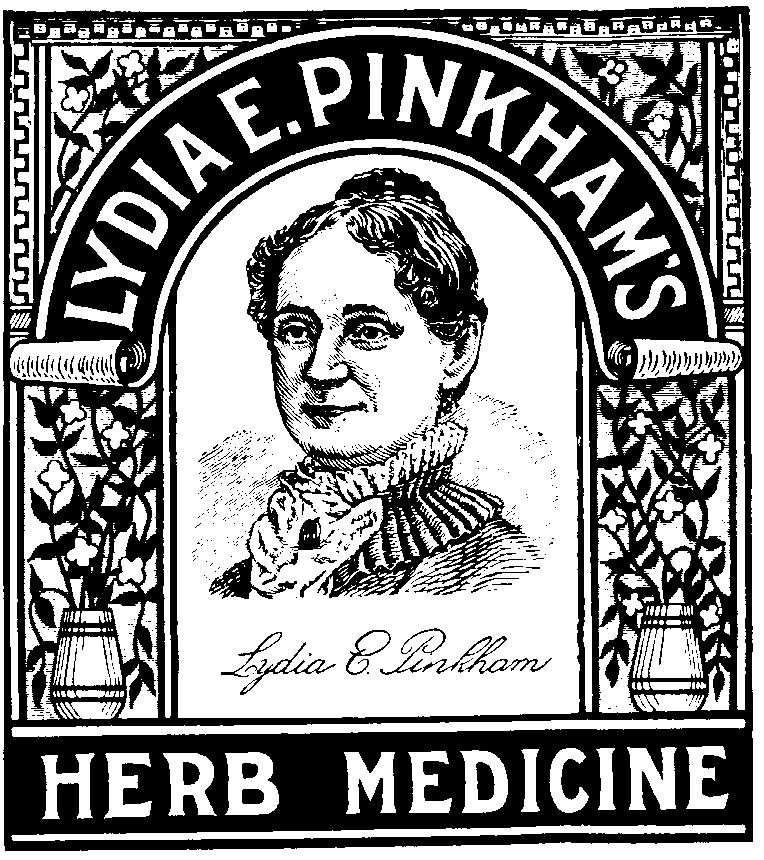
Lydia Pinkham's Herb Medicine (circa 1875) remains on the market today.

- Absorbine Jr.
- Anacin/Anadin
- Andrews Liver Salts
- Aspro aspirin tablets
- BC Powder
- Bromo-Seltzer
- Carter's Little Liver Pills (currently sold as Carter's Little Pills)
- Chlorodyne
- Doan's Pills
- Fletcher's Castoria
- Geritol
- Goody's Powder
- Dr. J.H. McLean's Volcanic Oil
- Lobeila Cough Syrup
- Lorman's Indian Oil
- Luden's Throat Drops
- Lydia E. Pinkham's Vegetable Compound
- Minard's Liniment
- Phillips' Milk of Magnesia
- Smith Brothers Throat Drops
- Vicks VapoRub

A number of patent medicines are produced in China. Among the best known of these is Shou Wu Chih, a black, alcoholic liquid that the makers claimed turned gray hair black.

=== Products no longer sold under medicinal claims ===
Some consumer products were once marketed as patent medicines, but have been repurposed and are no longer sold for medicinal purposes. Their original ingredients may have been changed to remove drugs, as was done with Coca-Cola. The compound may also simply be used in a different capacity, as in the case of Angostura Bitters, now associated chiefly with cocktails.

- 7-Up
- Angostura Bitters
- Bovril
- Buckfast Tonic Wine
- Coca-Cola
- Fernet Branca
- Graham crackers
- Grape-Nuts
- Hires Root Beer
- Moxie brand soda
- Pepsi Cola

== See also ==
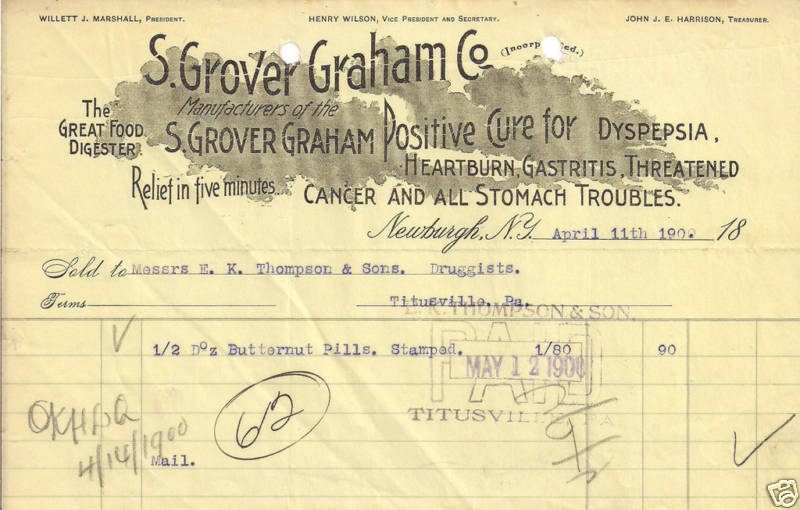
Receipt from 1900 for a patent medicine claiming a "Positive Cure for Dyspepsia, Heartburn, Gastritis, Threatened Cancer and all Stomach Troubles" with "Relief in five minutes"

- List of topics characterized as pseudoscience
- Blue mass (not a patent medicine, but a popular contemporary remedy)
- Chinese patent medicine
- Drug fraud and Pharmaceutical fraud
- Homeopathy
- Opodeldoc
- Projector (patent)
- Quackery
- Revalenta arabica, 18th century nostrum
- Tono-Bungay
- Universal panacea
