= A535 =

A535 may refer to:

- HNoMS Valkyrien (A535), a Norwegian naval vessel
- RUB A535, a topical analgesic manufactured by Church & Dwight
- A535 road in Cheshire in England
