= EYI =

EYI or Eyi may refer to:

- Eyi, a given name
- Eyi, name for rabbit, a taboo in Igbuzo, Nigeria
- EYI, a distributing company of supplement Calorad
