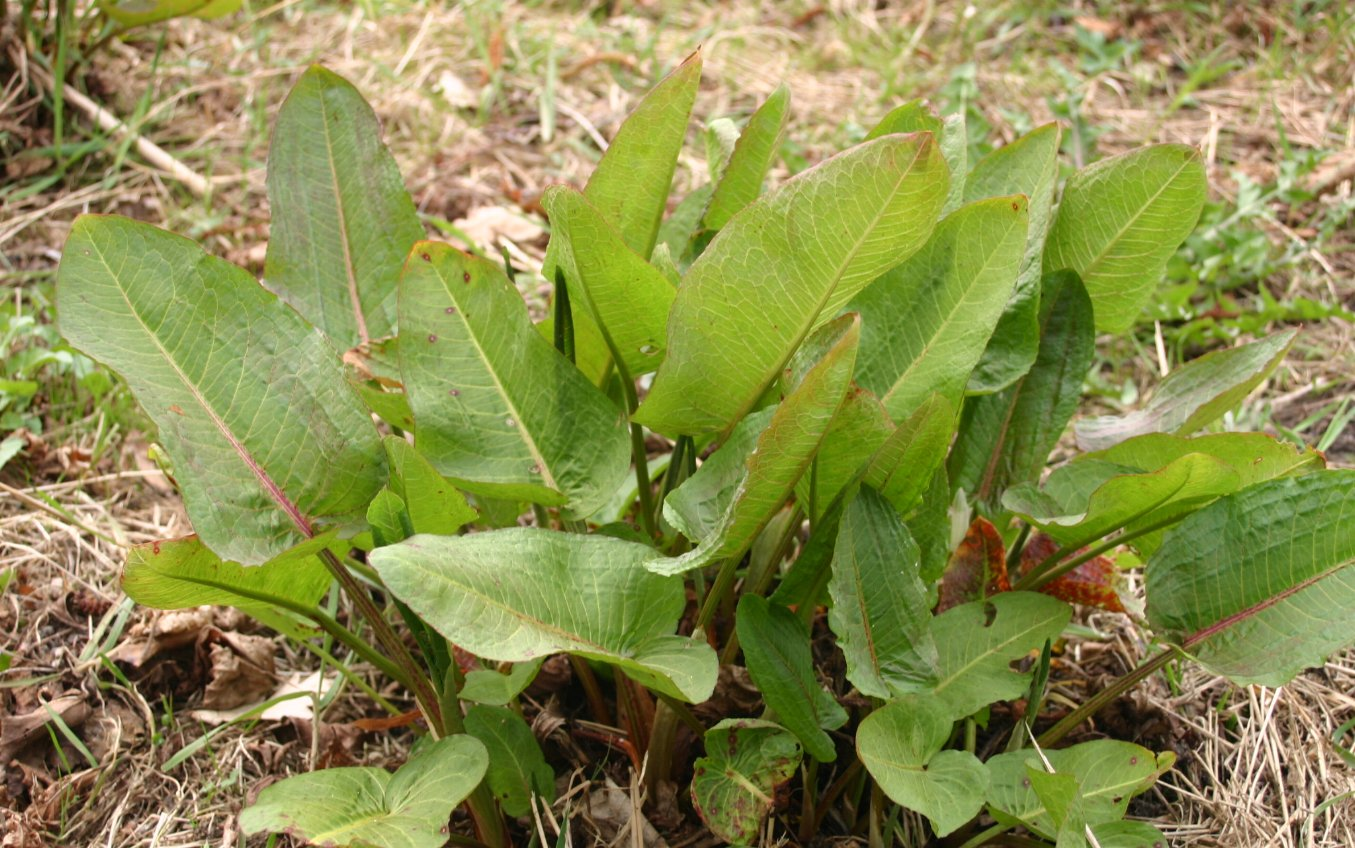

Scientific classification
- Kingdom: Plantae
- Clade: Tracheophytes
- Clade: Angiosperms
- Clade: Eudicots
- Order: Caryophyllales
- Family: Polygonaceae
- Genus: Rumex
- Species: R. obtusifolius

Binomial name
- Rumex obtusifolius L.

Synonyms
- Rumex sylvestris (Lam.) Campd.

= Rumex obtusifolius =

Broad-leaved dock

Species of flowering plant

Rumex obtusifolius, commonly known as bitter dock, broad-leaved dock, bluntleaf dock, dock leaf, dockens or butter dock, is a perennial plant in the family Polygonaceae. It is native to Europe, but is found on all temperate continents. It is a highly invasive species in some zones, resulting from its abundant seed dispersal, adaptability to reproduce, aggressive roots, ability to tolerate extreme climates, and hardiness.

== Etymology ==
The name, Rumex obtusifolius, was assigned by Carl Linnaeus in the 18th century, and has remained unchanged, although there are numerous subspecies. Rumex was Pliny's name for sorrel, while obtusifolius means 'obtuse-leaved' (obtuse + foliage).

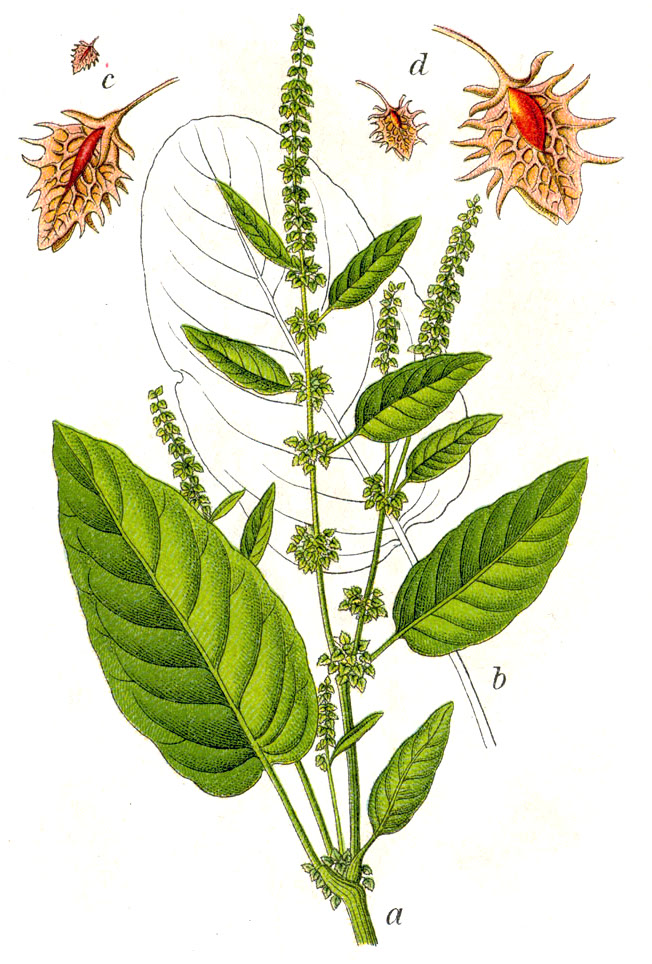
Botanical illustration of Rumex obtusifolius

== Description ==
Rumex obtusifolius is a perennial herbaceous flowering plant that grows to a height of 40 to 150 cm (16 to 59 in). It is easily recognizable by its very large oval leaves with cordate bases and rounded tips, some of the lower leaves having red stems. The edges of the leaves are slightly "crisped" or wavy, the upper surface is hairless and the under surface may be papillose. The leaves of this plant can grow to about 30 cm (12 in) in length and 15 centimetres (5.9 in) wide. The taproot is large, with numerous branches extending to a depth of 150 centimetres (59 in), with tough stems, often reddish, and unbranched until just below the inflorescence.

The junctions of the petioles with the stems are covered by a sheath formed by two fused stipules known as an ocrea, a thin, paper-like membrane – a characteristic of the family Polygonaceae. The stem leaves are alternate and are narrowly ovate–lanceolate. The inflorescence consists of large clusters of racemes which contain small greenish flowers that change to red as they mature. The perianth-segments are in two whorls of three. Segments in the outer whorl are small and spreading while the inner whorl forms fruit valves, which are widely ovately-triangular. The seeds produced are dry and reddish brown. This plant blooms June through September.

Rumex crispus – curly dock – is similar in appearance, but with thinner and wave-like leaves. In more detail, the calyx of curly dock has smooth margins while the calyx of broad-leaved dock has horned margins.

== Distribution and habitat ==
Rumex obtusifolius is widely distributed throughout the world. It is a plant growing readily on arable land, meadows, waste ground, roadsides, ditches, shorelines, riverbanks, woodland margins, forest clearings, and orchards. Seedlings can be identified by the oval leaves with red stems and rolled leaves sprouting from the center of the plant. Regrowth from the rosette usually takes place in spring.

== Uses ==
Uses of broad leaved dock include as a laxative, astringent, and cooking ingredient. The young leaves can be eaten as greens, but they become bitter early in the growing season.

The dried seeds can be ground to make flour, and in Turkey, Romania and Greece the leaves are sometimes used as an alternative to other plants in the making of sarmale.

They are not generally considered poisonous, however the leaves can trigger mild dermatitis in some. The seeds can be toxic to chickens, and large quantities of leaves can make cattle and horses ill. They contain oxalic acid which can be hazardous if consumed in large quantities.

In folk medicine, they have been thought to soothe burns, blisters, and nettle stings, and a tea prepared from the root was thought to cure boils.

In Ireland and the United Kingdom, the plant is often found growing near stinging nettles and there is a widely held belief that the underside of the dock leaf, squeezed to extract a little juice, can be rubbed on the skin to counteract the itching caused by brushing against a nettle plant. This home remedy is not supported by any science, although it is possible that the act of rubbing may act as a distracting counterstimulation, or that belief in the dock's effect may provide a placebo effect.

The alternative name of 'butter dock' is in reference to the traditional use of the leaves to wrap butter for market, such as described in George Eliot's Adam Bede, set in the early 19th century.

Rumex obtusifolius is a major host plant for many different insects as well, including the Acronicta rumicis moth. For A. rumicis research, this host plant is generally targeted because it is found highly within the moth's range.

== Invasiveness and eradication ==
Rumex obtusifolius is an aggressive invasive species on all temperate continents. Broad-leaved dock is designated an "injurious weed" under the UK Weeds Act 1959. It has been an invasive species of the Great Lakes region of North America where it was first sighted in 1840.

Various parasites and predators of R. obtusifolius include 32 insect species and 12 fungi species. In the UK, the invertebrate herbivore species is a leaf beetle, Gastrophysa viridula.
