= America in The Morning =

American syndicated radio news program

- Other names: America This Week (weekend version)
- Genre: News magazine
- Running time: 1 hour (5:00 am – 6:00 am)
- Country of origin: United States
- Language: English
- Syndicates: Mutual Broadcasting System; Westwood One; Dial Global/Westwood One
- Starring: Jim Bohannon (1984-2015, guest reporter until 2021); John Trout (2015-2026)
- Produced by: Jeff McKay
- Executive producer: Kevin Delaney
- Original release: September 17, 1984 – September 18, 2026
- Sponsored by: Salonpas
- Website: www.westwoodone.com

America in The Morning was a news program airing on numerous talk radio stations, syndicated by Westwood One, a subsidiary of Cumulus Media. During its run, the one-hour live program aired weekdays at 5:00 a.m. Eastern Time and was hosted by John Trout.

The show featured reports from AP Radio News, as well as a national forecast from AccuWeather, a look ahead to the day on Wall Street from CNBC, and the short-form feature Offbeat.

America in The Morning originally debuted on the Mutual Broadcasting System on September 17, 1984. Jim Bohannon hosted the broadcast from its inception until December 2015. At that point, Trout took over the hosting chores after Bohannon decided to cut back his schedule, concentrating on his nightly Westwood One talk program.

Despite stepping down as host, Bohannon contributed occasional feature stories and interviews to America in the Morning until at least late 2021.

A weekend version, America This Week, another former Mutual news program, is available from Westwood One.

An alternate one-hour Westwood One news program known as First Light, hosted by news anchor Michael Toscano, also aired at 5 a.m. Eastern Time until its cancellation on July 29, 2022. (The two similar, competing programs originated from different networks—First Light being an NBC production—before Westwood One acquired both networks.) The two broadcasts had similar formats and some reporters were heard on both programs.

Westwood One announced to its affiliates that America in the Morning would be ending following its September 18, 2026 broadcast. In its place, Westwood One will offer an AM edition of its conservative talk podcast Bongino Report from Dan Bongino, who had returned to Westwood One the month prior. Other affiliates chose to carry This Morning, America's First News with Gordon Deal or local content.
