= A.B.C. Liniment =

Toxic patent medicine liniment

- Type: Liniment
- Inception: 1880; 146 years ago
- Last production year: 1935 (?)

A.B.C. Liniment was a highly toxic patent medicine liniment sold between approximately 1880 to 1935 as a topical pain relieving agent. It was sold for relief of pain caused by various ailments, including lumbago (lower back pain), sciatica, neuralgia, rheumatism, and stiffness after exercise. The name A.B.C Liniment comes from the three primary active ingredients, aconitine, belladonna, and chloroform. There were numerous examples of poisonings from the mixture, resulting in at least one death.
