= DNIC =

DNIC can stand for:

- Data Network Identification Code
- Diffuse noxious inhibitory controls
- In Christianity, Dominus Noster Iesus Christus (and other grammatical variants; "Our Lord Jesus Christ")
- In biochemistry, dinitrosyl iron complex
- DoD Network Information Center

== Law enforcement organizations ==
- National Police of Honduras#Dirección Nacional de Inteligencia Criminal
- Direcção nacional de investigação criminal (Angola)
- Dirección Nacional de Investigación Criminal (Argentina)
