= Counterstimulation =

Pain management based on distraction

Counterstimulation is nerve stimulation that changes the sensations perceived in the body. The neurological phenomenon is fundamental to the understanding of itching, as a spot that itches usually stops being itchy after it is rubbed or scratched. The scratching or rubbing is the counterstimulation.

Another basic example is the practice of rubbing a fresh bruise, so that attention is paid to the sense of touch and pressure, rather than to the pain of the injury. Liniment and "medicated" products containing menthol work in the same way, producing sensations such as heat or cold or strong odors.

Counterstimulation can also be applied to a remote part of the body.

Pain control can also be achieved by the use of electronic media, such as television or virtual reality.

Counterstimulation is consistent with the gate control theory of pain.

Counterstimulation is different from diffuse noxious inhibitory control (DINC). Counterstimulation involves stimulating the nerves in the same place (homotopic, such as scratching an itch), and DINC usually does not (heterotopic, such as a stubbed toe relieving pain from a papercut on the thumb).

== See also ==
- Counterirritant
