= Diffuse noxious inhibitory control =

Diffuse noxious inhibitory controls (DNIC) or conditioned pain modulation (CPM) refers to an endogenous pain modulatory pathway which has often been described as "pain inhibits pain". It occurs when response from a painful stimulus is inhibited by another, often spatially distant, noxious stimulus.

== Mechanism ==
Noxious stimuli activate the endings of nociceptive C and A delta nerve fibers, which carry the signal to neurons in the dorsal horn of spinal cord. DNIC refers to the mechanism by which dorsal horn wide dynamic range neurons responsive to stimulation from one location of the body may be inhibited by noxious stimuli (such as heat, high pressure or electric stimulation) applied to another, remote location in the body. The inhibition is thought to originate in the brain, and is thought to affect both wide dynamic range and nociception-specific neurons in the dorsal horn.

Studies investigating gender differences in DNIC have shown mixed results with the effect dependent upon experimental methodology and measurement method.

== Measurement method ==
Pressure pain threshold (PPT) and pain tolerance (PTol) parameters are widely used as a measure of DNIC. Equipment such as metal pressure algometer with a rubber top is used to apply pressure to a person's finger or toe. The pressure at which the first sensation of pain is felt is recorded as PPT. The pressure is increased further and noted when the person says the pain is intolerable. This higher value is recorded as PTol. A second noxious stimulus (such as ice water) is then applied to a different part of the body and PPT/PTol measured. DNIC response is defined as an increase in the value of PPT during the second noxious stimulation.

== Clinical use ==
The DNIC model is used frequently to quantify the central pain sensitization in chronic pain patients. DNIC inefficiency (or lower DNIC) has been implicated as a risk factor for development of chronic pain and pain syndromes. Chronic pain disorders such as temporomandibular disorder and fibromyalgia have been associated with DNIC inefficiency. On the other hand, greater DNIC response is related to less pain, better physical functioning, and better self-rated health. Diabetic neuropathy patients with low DNIC are more likely to benefit from treatment with duloxetine and tapentadol, which are considered to restore altered descending modulation.

DNIC forms the basis for the use of counterirritant to reduce pain.

== See also ==
- Counterirritant
- Counterstimulation
- Pain
