= Bengay =

Brand of analgesic heat rub

- Product type: Analgesic heat rub
- Current owner: Kenvue
- Produced by: Kenvue
- Country: Developed in France by Dr. Jules Bengué
- Introduced: 1898; 128 years ago (as Ben-Gay)
- Markets: Over-the-counter drug
- Previous owners: Pfizer
- Website: www.bengay.com

Bengay, spelled Ben-Gay before 1995, is a topical analgesic heat rub for temporary relief from muscle and joint pain associated with arthritis, bruises, simple backaches, overuse, sprains and strains.

== Overview ==
Bengay was developed in France by Dr. Jules Bengué (French pronunciation: [ʒyl bɛ̃ɡe]) and brought to North America in 1898. The name Bengué was Anglicized and commercialized to Ben-Gay (later Bengay). It was originally produced by Pfizer Consumer Healthcare, which was acquired by Johnson & Johnson. The product is advised to be used topically for adults and children 12 years of age and older, and no more than 3 to 4 times daily. The manufacturer recommends storing it between 20 and 25 °C (68 and 77 °F).

According to a study published by MIT Technology Review, the exact mechanism of its efficacy is not known. However, evidence indicates that it activates the neuron receptor TRPM8, which appears to keep minor pain signals in the brain from communicating with the spine.

== Hazards ==
Bengay and similar products, such as Flexall, Mentholatum, Capzasin and Icy Hot, variously contain menthol, methyl salicylate (oil of wintergreen), and capsaicin as active ingredients and have a potential to cause first-to-third-degree chemical burns. Some people have been hospitalized after receiving such burns.

Methyl salicylate can be toxic when used excessively in large doses, many multiples of the recommended amount, are administered; but such incidents are very rare.

In June 2007, a teenage athlete in New York overdosed and died from overexposure to methyl salicylate, having "more than six times the safe amount of the ingredient in her body."

== Active ingredients ==
Active ingredients vary by product version, including:

- Bengay: Original – 18.3% methyl salicylate and 16% menthol.
- Bengay: Muscle Pain/Ultra Strength – 30% methyl salicylate, 10% menthol, and 4% camphor.
- Bengay: Ice Extra Strength – 10% menthol.
- Bengay: Muscle Pain/No Odor – 15% triethanolamine salicylate.
- Bengay: Arthritis Extra Strength – 30% methyl salicylate and 8% menthol.

== Other uses ==
Bengay can be used to remove chewing gum from clothing, as the methyl salicylate serves to loosen and diffuse the gum base.

== See also ==
- Tiger Balm
- Heat Rub
- IcyHot
- Deep Heat
- Flexpower
- RUB A535
