= Hisamitsu Pharmaceutical =

Japanese pharmaceutical corporation

Hisamitsu Pharmaceutical Co., Inc.

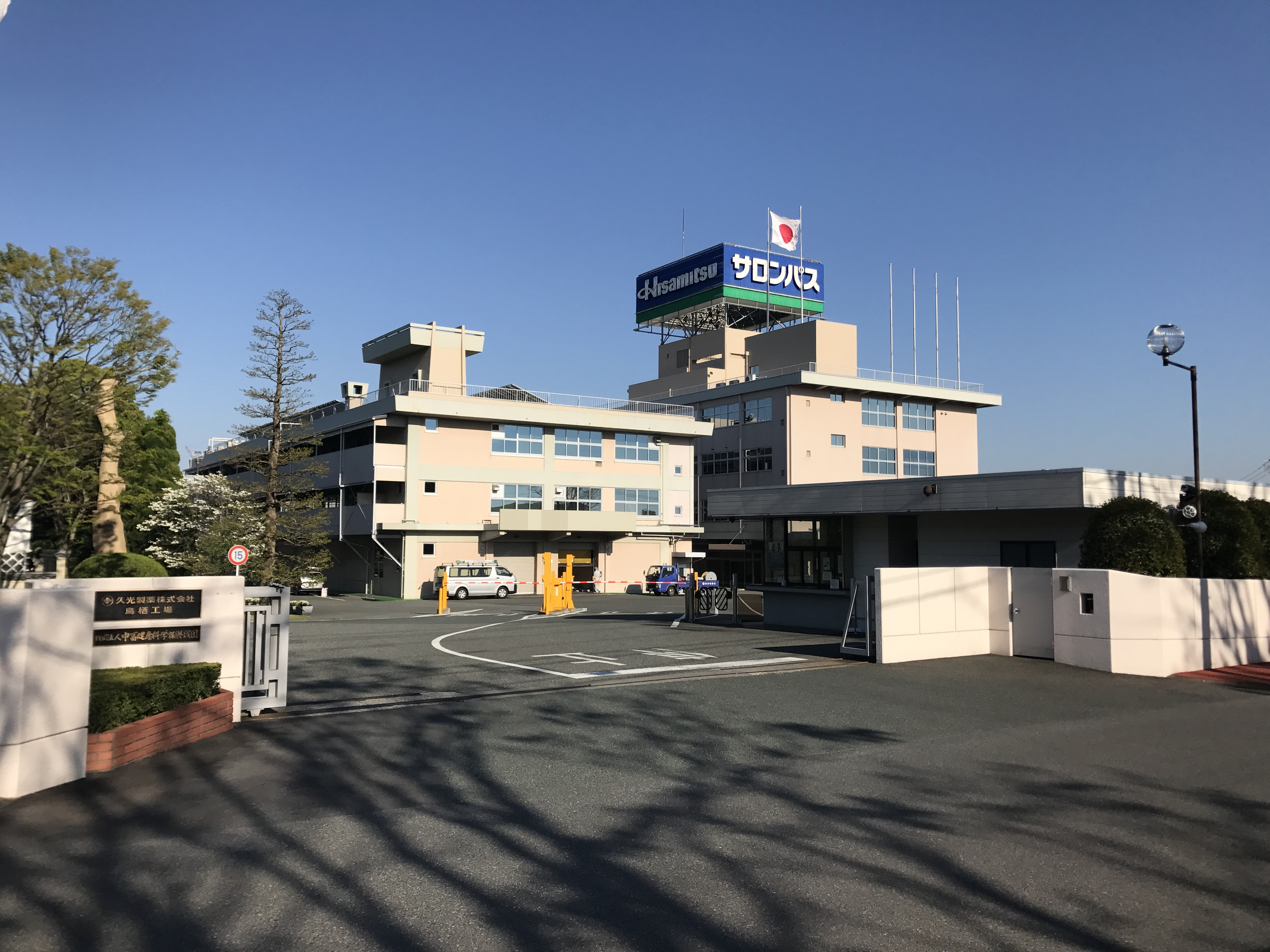
- Hisamitsu's headquarters in Tosu, Japan.
- Native name: 久光製薬株式会社
- Romanized name: Hisamitsu Seiyaku kabushiki gaisha
- Company type: Public
- Traded as: TYO: 4530; NAG: 4530; FSE: 4530
- Industry: Pharmaceutical
- Founded: 1847; 179 years ago
- Headquarters: Tosu, Saga, Japan; Marunouchi, Chiyoda, Tokyo, Japan
- Area served: Worldwide
- Key people: Hirotaka Nakatomi (President and CEO)
- Products: Salonpas and other pain relief products; Robitussin, Caltrate, Advil (Japan-only); Other medicines
- Revenue: ▲JPY 150.63 billion (US$1.47 billion) (FY 2013)
- Net income: ▲JPY 21.35 billion (US$209.5 million) (FY 2013)
- Number of employees: 2,949 (2014)
- Website: global.hisamitsu

The Hisamitsu Pharmaceutical Co., Inc. (Japanese: 久光製薬株式会社, Hepburn: Hisamitsu Seiyaku kabushiki gaisha), headquartered in Tosu and Tokyo, is a Japanese multinational pharmaceutical corporation that develops and markets prescription and over-the-counter drug (OTC) products, especially external pain relieving products such as the transdermal patch. Hisamitsu has specialised in transdermal drug delivery system technology (TDDS) since the introduction of its original line of patches in 1903.

Hisamitsu's products under the Salonpas and Bye-Bye Fever brands are exported to over fifty countries. Hisamitsu also manufactures the Mohrus and Mohrus-Tape lines of external pain relief prescription products for the Japanese drug market. The company also manufactures internal medicines, eyedrops for general application, and the Lifecella Face Mask, a skincare product. Hisamitsu has developed the only over-the-counter transdermal patches approved by the U.S Food and Drug Administration (FDA).

== History ==
Hisamitsu Pharmaceutical was founded in 1847 under the name Komatsuya. It was established in Tosu, which is now in Saga Prefecture, on the island of Kyushu. This region is well known in Japan for its tradition of herbal medicines.

The prototype of Hisamitsu's Salonpas patch was created in 1903 through the application of asahi mankinko, a poultice consisting of rubbing ointment pasted onto Japanese paper. The product line developed from this traditional remedy was introduced in 1934 and first exported to overseas markets in 1937.

A subsidiary branch was opened in Taiwan in 1960. In 1975 a joint company was established in Indonesia (PT Hisamitsu Pharma Indonesia). More subsidiaries followed in Brazil (Hisamitsu Farmaceutica do Brasil Ltda.) in 1986, in Singapore (Hisamitsu Pharmaceutical Singapore Pte. Ltd.) and in the United States (Hisamitsu America, Inc.) in 1987. Hisamitsu Vietnam Pharmaceutical Co., Ltd. was established in Vietnam in 1994. In 1998 Hisamitsu U.K. opened in London and a research laboratory was established in California.

In 1965 the company changed its name to Hisamitsu Pharmaceutical Co., Ltd., and in 1972 it was listed on the first section of the Tokyo Stock Exchange. The company began manufacturing and marketing prescription drugs during the 1970s. In 1988, it launched Mohrus, and in 1995, Mohrus-Tape, both prescription external anti-inflammatory drugs. Salonpas Pain Relief Patch and Salonpas Arthritis Pain were approved for over the counter sales in the United States in 2008. In 2009, Hisamitsu acquired Noven Pharmaceuticals, a specialty prescription drug transdermal pharmaceutical company based in Florida.

== Locations ==
Hisamitsu operates two primary bases in Japan, in Saga Prefecture and in Tokyo. It has two subsidiaries in the United States: Hisamitsu America, Inc. in Florham Park, NJ, and Noven Pharmaceuticals in Miami, FL. It has a clinical research department in New Jersey and a research laboratory in Carlsbad, CA. Hisamitsu also has overseas facilities in Britain, Australia, Brazil, the Philippines, Hong Kong, Singapore, Vietnam, Indonesia, Taiwan and Malaysia.

Hisamitsu America is the sole importer and distributor of Salonpas products for the United States and Canada. It was founded in 1987.

== Products ==
Hisamitsu Pharmaceutical offers a variety of prescription and over-the-counter products, including transdermal patches and skin care products. Its product lines include the Salonpas pain relief patches; Mohrus Tape, a transdermal patch containing ketoprofen for the treatment of back pain; Vesicum, a formulation containing ibuprofen piconol; and Estrana, a transdermal therapeutic estradiol drug. According to the company, Mohrus and Mohrus-Tape have the largest market share in prescription external anti-inflammatory drugs in Japan with 54% in 2nd generation NSAID patches. The firm's over-the-counter Salonpas products include a range of external pain relieving patches and aerosols for pains such as arthritis, backache, muscle strains, sprains and bruises.
