= RUB A535 =

Topical pain relief medicine

- Type: Liniment
- Inception: 1919; 107 years ago
- Available: Available

RUB A535 (also known as Antiphlogistine) is a rubefacient introduced in 1919 and manufactured by Church & Dwight in Montreal, Quebec, Canada.

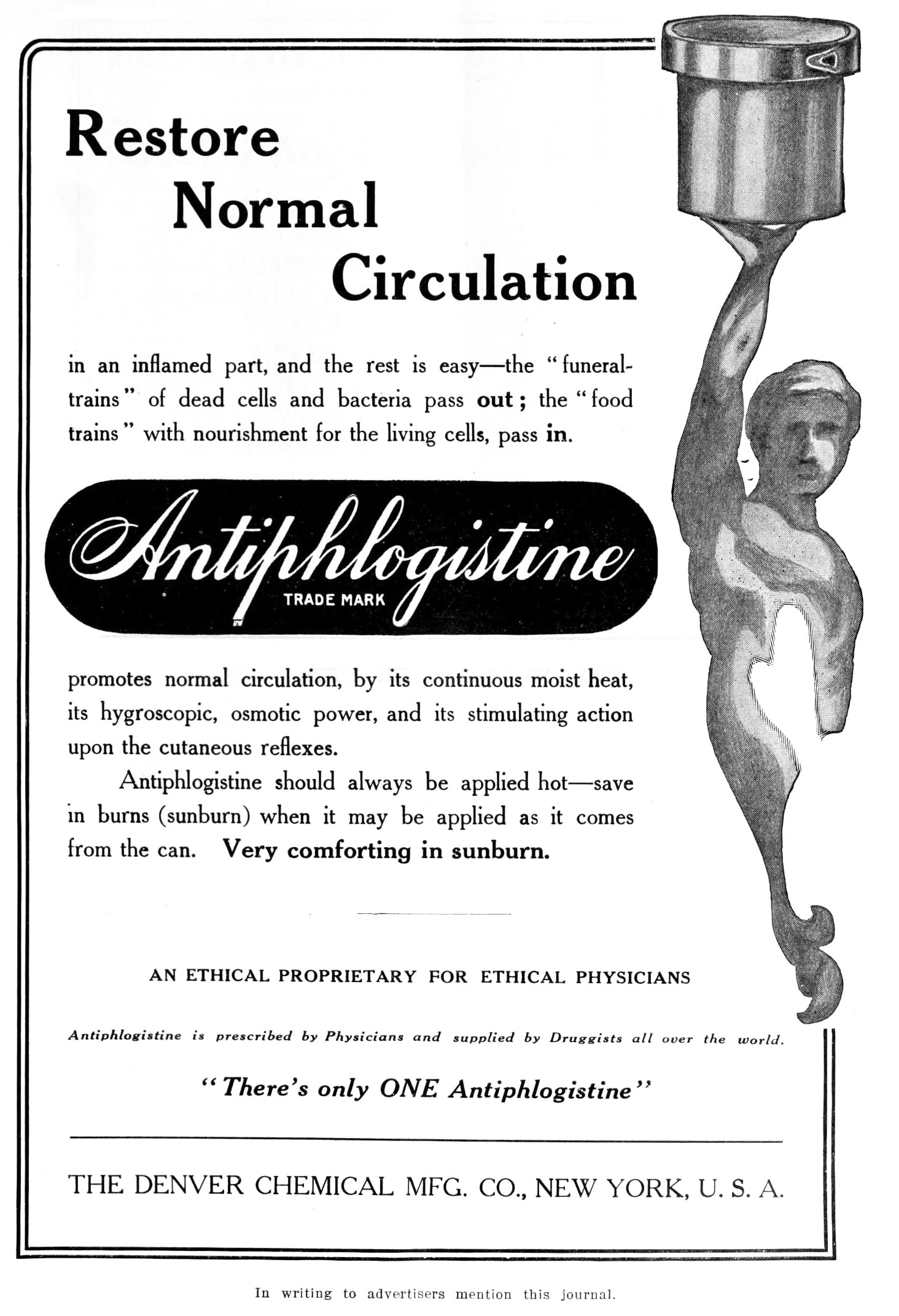
A 1914 advertisement

While little known outside of Canada, it is used there for the treatment of tough muscle pain, arthritic pains, rheumatic pains, bursitis, lumbago, etc. Church and Dwight say on their website that nearly all the research, development and production of RUB A535 is carried out in Canada. Patients who are allergic to salicylates (ASA based drugs, such as aspirin), or who are taking anticoagulant medications should avoid the use of the product. It is also recommended to not use it more than 3–4 times a day.

== Ingredients ==
The active ingredients in RUB A535 are camphor, eucalyptus oil, menthol, and methyl salicylate. Some formulations also contain capsaicin and triethanolamine.

== Varieties ==
Currently, RUB A535 has been released in a variety of products:

- Originally, it was produced in a particular white cream, carrying a rather offensive medical odour.
- Recently, the name was also given to a line of dual action back patches that change temperature (known as Hot-Cold patches).
- An improved cream was also developed, claiming to be odorless, differing from their normal cream, which carries the same smell as most topical analgesics.
- As of 2008, the "Ultra Heat" sport stick was released and shipped to many provinces, including Manitoba. It is sold as individual units containing 100 g of spearmint-smelling cream in packaging resembling an orange-coloured, slightly taller than usual deodorant stick. Like some deodorant sticks, the cream is dispensed by first uncapping the unit, then turning a dial at the bottom of the unit, thus pushing the cream up and out through three slits at the top.
- There is also a cold A535 named "Ice".

== See also ==
- Liniment

== References in other disciplines ==
Historically, the then local distributor was involved in a notable case in the High Court of Australia, about State income tax, Denver Chemical Manufacturing Company v The Commissioner of Taxation (New South Wales) (1949) 79 CLR 296. It simply involved a difference of views about how to disclose income on a tax return, but is the leading authority in its area.
