= Minard's Liniment =

Medicine brand

- Type: Liniment
- Inception: 1879; 147 years ago
- Available: Available

Minard's Liniment Advertisement from the 1860s

Minard's is a brand of liniment.

== History ==
Like other patent medicines, Minard's was sold by its creator with exaggerated claims. Dr. Levi Minard the "King of Pain" from Hants County, Nova Scotia, created Minard's Liniment. The cream is a special liniment for easing stiff, sore muscles, and aching backs.

Dr. Minard's preparation, which he developed in the 1860s from ingredients known to bring comfort and relief, became a popular home therapeutic. Its use became widespread throughout the Maritime provinces and in Newfoundland. The popularity of Minard's Liniment then pushed west into Quebec and Ontario, where it became known as the "King of Pain Relief" because of the immediate relief it brought.

The Minard's Liniment brand was acquired by Stella Pharmaceutical in 1998.

== Active ingredients ==
Camphor: acts on nerve endings in the skin to produce numbness at the site of application, reducing pain and discomfort in muscle joints and the area below the skin where applied.

Ammonia Water: an alkaline substance that helps alleviate burning sensations.

Turpentine: a substance distilled from pine trees, it is a counter-irritant. A counter-irritant produces a mild, inflammatory reaction where applied in order to relieve more deep-seated pain or discomfort. It has analgesic properties and aids in stimulating circulation.
