= HNoMS Valkyrien (A535) =

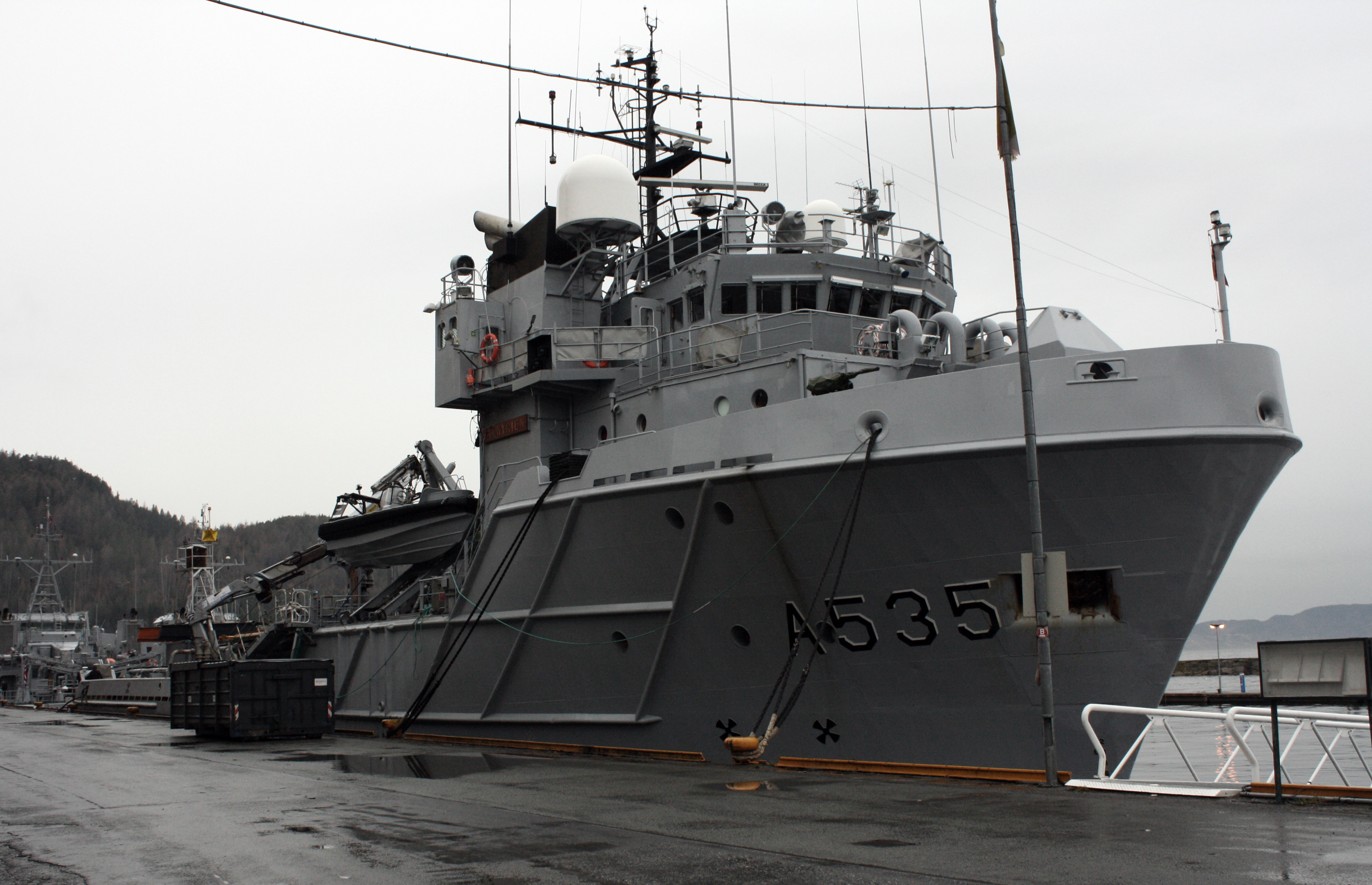
- Valkyrien in Trondheim in 2009

History

Norway
- Name: Valkyrien (A535)
- Namesake: Valkyrie
- Launched: 1981
- Acquired: by purchase, 4 February 1994
- Decommissioned: 2016
- Identification: IMO number: 8008541; MMSI number: 258311000; Callsign: LBEA

General characteristics
- Type: Logistics vessel
- Displacement: 3,500 long tons (3,556 t)
- Length: 68 m (223 ft)
- Beam: 14.5 m (48 ft)
- Draught: 5 m (16 ft)
- Ice class: C
- Speed: 16.5 knots (30.6 km/h; 19.0 mph)
- Complement: 26+

HNoMS Valkyrien has the pennant number A535 and is the present support vessel for the Royal Norwegian Navy Coastal Combat Flotilla. Valkyrien was built as a civilian supply vessel in 1981. She was bought by the RNoN in 1994. Command was assumed on 4 February 1994. The ship has a strengthened hull and meets the requirements of ice breaking class ICE C. The vessel has a displacement of 3,000 tons and a top speed of 16.5 knots (30.6 km/h). The ship also had towing and anchor handling capacities. As a civilian ship she had a crew of 11. Today she has a crew of about 20-25.

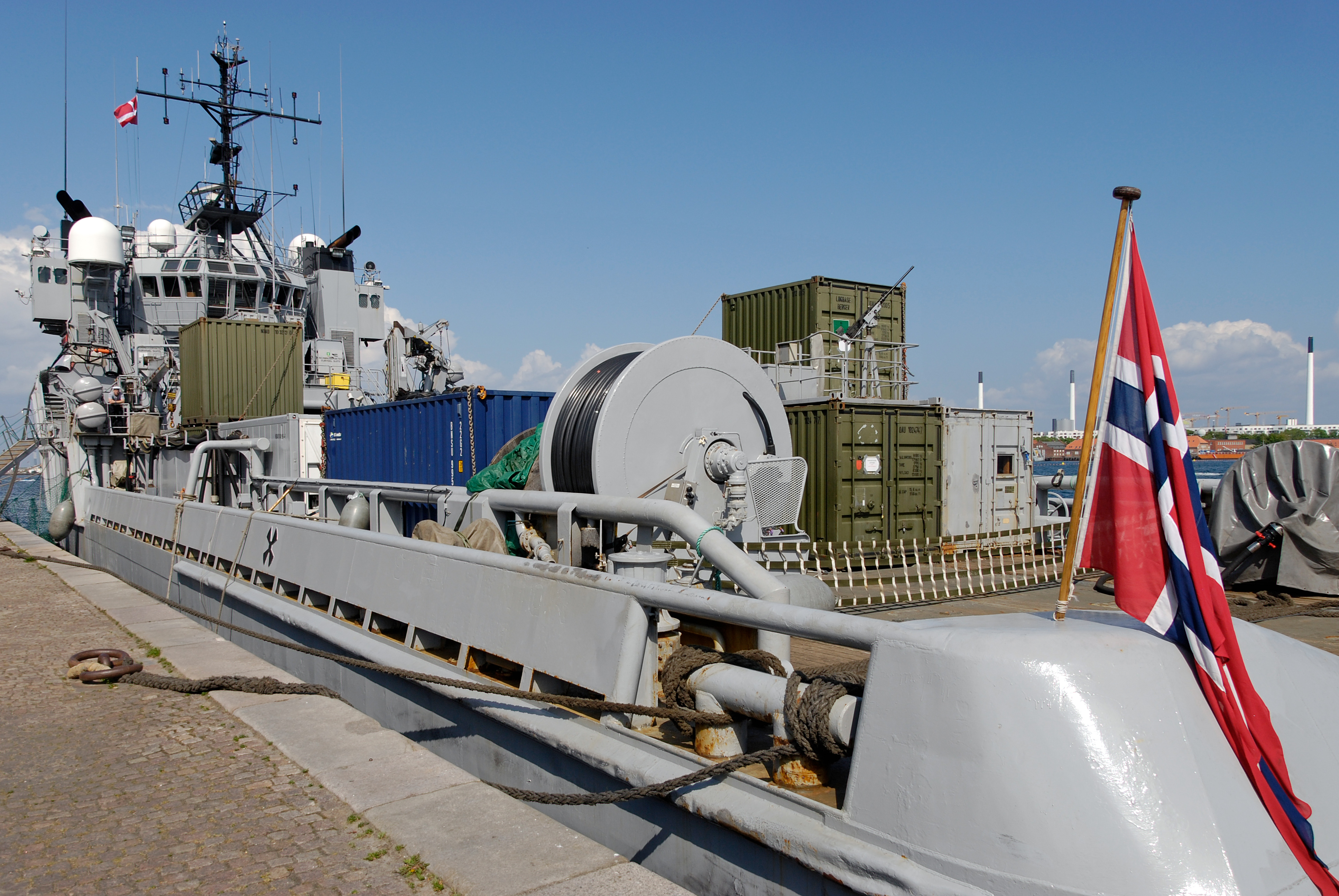
HNoMS Valkyrien docked in Copenhagen
