= Opodeldoc =

Medical plaster or liniment invented by Paracelsus

- Type: Liniment
- Available: Available

Opodeldoc is a medical plaster or liniment invented, or at least named, by the German Renaissance physician Paracelsus in the 1500s. In modern form opodeldoc is a mixture of soap in alcohol, to which camphor and sometimes a number of herbal essences, most notably wormwood, are added.

== Origins ==
In his Bertheonea Sive Chirurgia Minor published in 1603, Paracelsus mentioned "oppodeltoch" twice, but with uncertain ingredients.

As to the origin of the name, Kurt Peters speculated that it was coined by Paracelsus from syllables from the words "opoponax, bdellium, and aristolochia." Opoponax is a variety of myrrh; bdellium is Commiphora wightii, which produces a similar resin; and Aristolochia is a widely distributed genus which includes A. pfeiferi, A. rugosa and A. trilobata that are used in folk medicine to cure snakebites. The name suggests that these aromatic plants may have figured in Paracelsus's recipe.

In his Medicina Militaris of 1620, German military physician Raymund Minderer ("Mindererus"; 1570-1621) praised the Paracelsus compound as a plaster, good for wounds. Minderer compared it to his own variant, which set more like sealing wax. Opodeldoc and Paracelsus were acknowledged in English no later than 1646, in Sir Thomas Browne's popular and influential Pseudodoxia Epidemica.

Paracelsus's recipe is completely unrelated to later preparations of the same name. By the second printing of the Edinburgh Pharmacopoeia in 1722 the name applied to a soap-based liniment. Such a liniment in patent form, sold by John Newbery's company in Great Britain "ever since A.D. 1786", was called "Dr. Steer's Opodeldoc". Produced for decades, the "Dr. Steer" preparation had been successfully imported into the U.S., and was common enough there to rank as one of the eight patent medicines to be analyzed (although not condemned) by the Philadelphia College of Pharmacy in 1824.

The name Old Opodeldoc was formerly used as a standard name for a stock character who was a physician, especially when played as a comic figure. Edgar Allan Poe used "Oppodeldoc" as a pseudonym for a character in the short story "The Literary Life of Thingum Bob, Esq."

== Modern usage ==
The Pharmacopoeia of the United States (U.S.P.) gives a recipe for opodeldoc that contains:

- Powdered soap, 60 grams;
- Camphor, 45 grams;
- Oil of rosemary, 10 milliliters;
- Alcohol, 700 milliliters;
- Water, enough to make 1000 milliliters

As late as the early 1990s 'Epideldoc' (sic) was compounded on request by several pharmacists in the Northwest of England.
