= Eyi =

Eyi is a name. Notable people with the name include:

- Princess Eyi (died 80 BCE), Chinese princess
- Kobena Eyi Acquah (born 1952), Ghanaian lawyer

== See also ==
- EYI (disambiguation)
