= W.F. Young, Inc. =

American animal care products company

- Company type: Privately held
- Industry: Animal care products
- Founded: 1892
- Founder: Wilbur & Mary Ida Young
- Headquarters: East Longmeadow, Massachusetts, United States
- Products: Liniments; Horse grooming supplies Horse fly-control Horse & Pet Supplements; Wound care
- Website: WFYoung.com

W.F. Young, Inc. is a privately held American corporation that has sold animal care products since 1892. These brands and products are sold online, in farm, feed, and tack shops, and pet retailers.

The corporation was founded by Wilbur Fenelon Young and Mary Ida Young and has been family owned and run by the Young family since 1892. Its headquarters are in East Longmeadow, Massachusetts.

The company is best known for its Absorbine line of rubefacients (whose medical effectiveness remains disputed), originally formulated as a horse liniment, but later reformulated for humans and marketed as Absorbine Jr., which was intensely promoted via a televised advertisement campaign aimed at the end consumer. Over time, the company has also acquired other liniment brands including Bigeloil.

In 2012, W.F. Young, Inc. underwent a strategic reorganization of the business to focus exclusively on animal care. They continued to grow their equine care product lines and expanded their offerings into the livestock and companion pet categories. With this change, W.F. Young divested itself of its human healthcare division. In 2013, DSE Healthcare took on the Absorbine Jr. brand.

== Founder's history ==
Wilbur Fenelon Young was born on November 18, 1863, in Wallingford, Connecticut, to Charles and Julia Tyler (Hine). On June 24, 1887, Wilbur married his first wife, Sadie Wilcox, who died in 1891. A year later, on November 16, 1892, he married Mary Ida Stephenson Young. Mary Ida was born on June 29, 1865, in Stonington, Maryland. Her parents were Thomas Bronson and Amelia F. (Stone) Stephenson. Mary Ida was a descendant of Thomas Stone, the first Protestant governor of Maryland and a signer of the Declaration of Independence. Together Wilbur and Mary Ida had two children, Wilbur II and Sally.

== Company history ==
W.F. Young, Inc. is an American company founded by Wilbur F. and Mary Ida Young in 1892 in Meriden, Connecticut. Wilbur delivered cargo with a team of workhorses while Mary Ida cared for the horses and home. In 1892, "blistering" was a common practice done to heal horse muscles, tendons, and joints faster when they were strained. The purpose was allow more blood to enter the area to heal the skin as it was believed that the injured joint would benefit from the extra blood flow. Wilbur and Mary Ida disapproved of this harsh method of treatment. Mary Ida was a herbalist, and formulated a liniment of menthol, wormwood oil, and herbs in her kitchen tub as an alternative to blistering, which she named Absorbine Veterinary Liniment.

The couple then founded W.F. Young, P.D.F. to market and sell the liniment. As neighboring farmers and drivers tried the liniment on their own horses, it grew in popularity. In 1893, W.F. Young, P.D.F. moved to Springfield, Massachusetts.

A few years later, Wilbur was inspired by his son to create a version of the liniment for humans, and Absorbine Jr. was introduced in 1903. Today, Absorbine Jr. products can be found in grocery, retailer supercenters, and drug stores. It is reported that the development of Absorbine Jr. was partially inspired by stories of local farmers using the Veterinary Liniment on themselves after a hard day's work.

After Wilbur Fenelon Young's death in 1918, Wilbur F. Young II took over the business at 20 years old. The following year, in 1919, W.F. Young, P.D.F. was incorporated to become W.F. Young, Inc. as it is known today. W.F. Young Inc. moved to Lyman Street in Springfield, Massachusetts in 1923.

When Wilbur II died in 1928, Mary Ida took over the business from her son. She ran the business until 1957, when her daughter, Sadie Stephenson (Sally) Young, and grandson Wilbur F. Young III were each promoted to president. Mary Ida Stephenson Young died on October 31, 1960, at age 95. Following Sally Young's death in 1977, Wilbur III became the sole president. He was president for 10 years until his death in 1987. At that time, Wilbur III's son, Tyler Young, became President and CEO.

W.F. Young, Inc. acquired the Equine America company and products on November 1, 2007. Equine America products include supplements, grooming aids, and muscle & joint relief.

On October 15, 2008, the board of directors at W.F. Young, Inc. appointed Adam D. Raczkowski as President of the company, with Tyler F. Young retaining his current role of CEO.

In 2012, W.F. Young, Inc. underwent a strategic reorganization of the business to focus exclusively on animal care. They continued to grow their equine care product lines and expanded their offerings into the livestock and companion pet categories. With this change, W.F. Young divested itself of its human healthcare division. In 2013, DSE Healthcare took on the Absorbine Jr. brand.

In 2013, the Equine America line of products was discontinued in the United States in an effort to focus on the growth of the Absorbine line. This led to the decision to move key Equine America brand products into the Absorbine family of products. B-L and Fungasol are now sold under the Absorbine name. The remaining Equine America products are available outside of the U.S. only.

In 2015, Tyler F. Young was promoted to Executive Chairman of the Board, with Adam D. Raczkowski taking over as CEO. Chris Jacobi, who had been serving as the general manager of the equine division, was appointed as President.

The company also expanded its pet care division in 2015, acquiring Pure Ocean Botanicals, makers of Pet Kelp products, and The Missing Link supplement line.

Product lines currently sold include items to improve the health and well-being of animals in the equine, pet, and livestock categories, including the original Absorbine Veterinary Liniment. The company continues to be owned and managed by fourth and fifth generations of the Young family.

In 2020, W.F. Young Inc., has partnered with A.J. Turvey & Associates.

== Management ==
Presidents

Jaime McKinley - 2021–present

Thierry R. Jean - 2020-2021

Adam D. Raczkowski - 2008–2019

Tyler F. Young - 1987-2008

Wilbur F. Young III - 1977-1987

Sally Young - 1957-1977

Mary Ida Young - 1928-1957

Wilbur F. Young II - 1918-1928

Wilbur Fenelon Young - 1892-1918

General Managers

J. Kenneth Alexander - 1956-1983

Henry Caswell - 1919-1956
