= Methyl salicylate =

Ester of salicylic acid

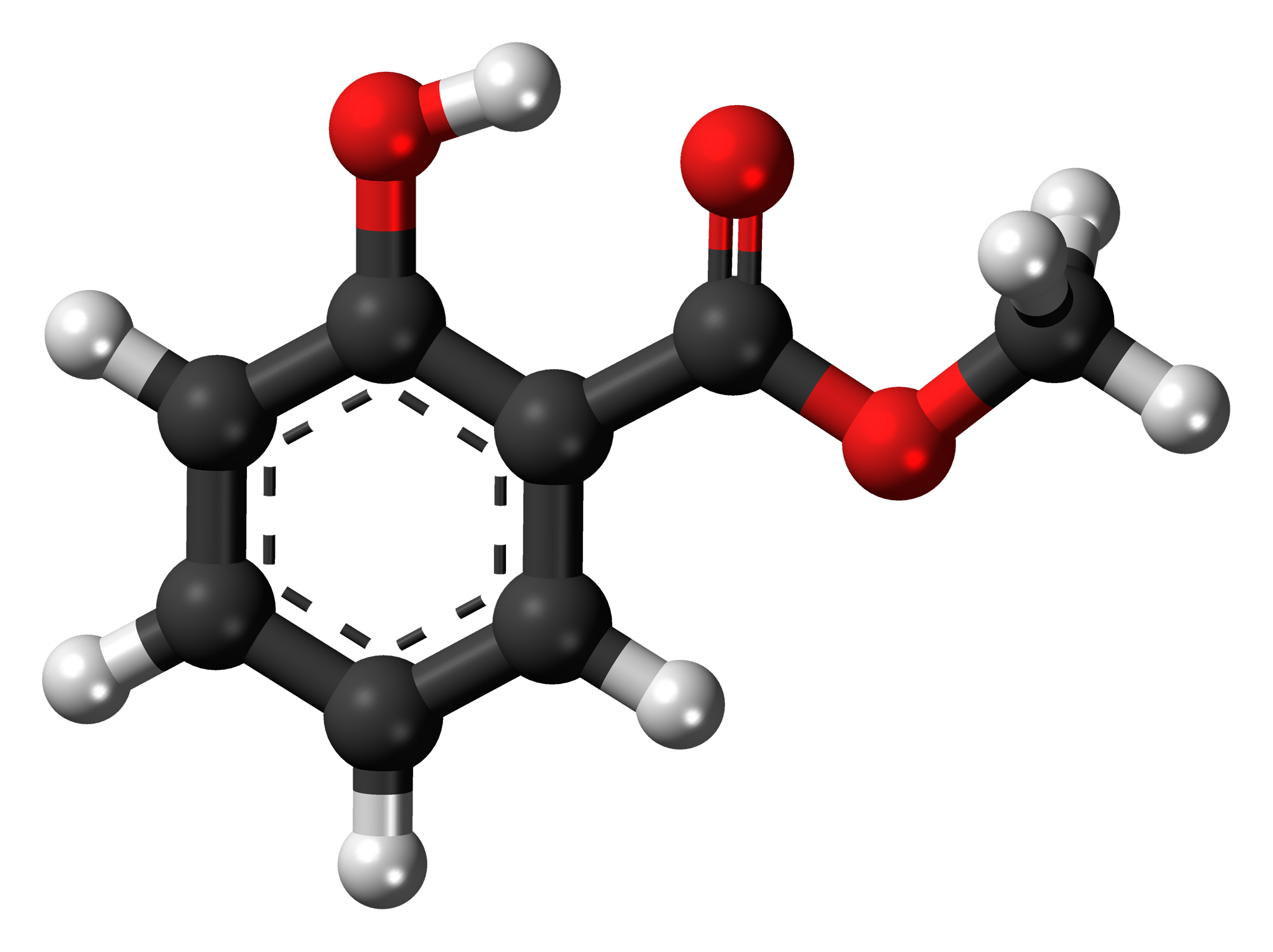

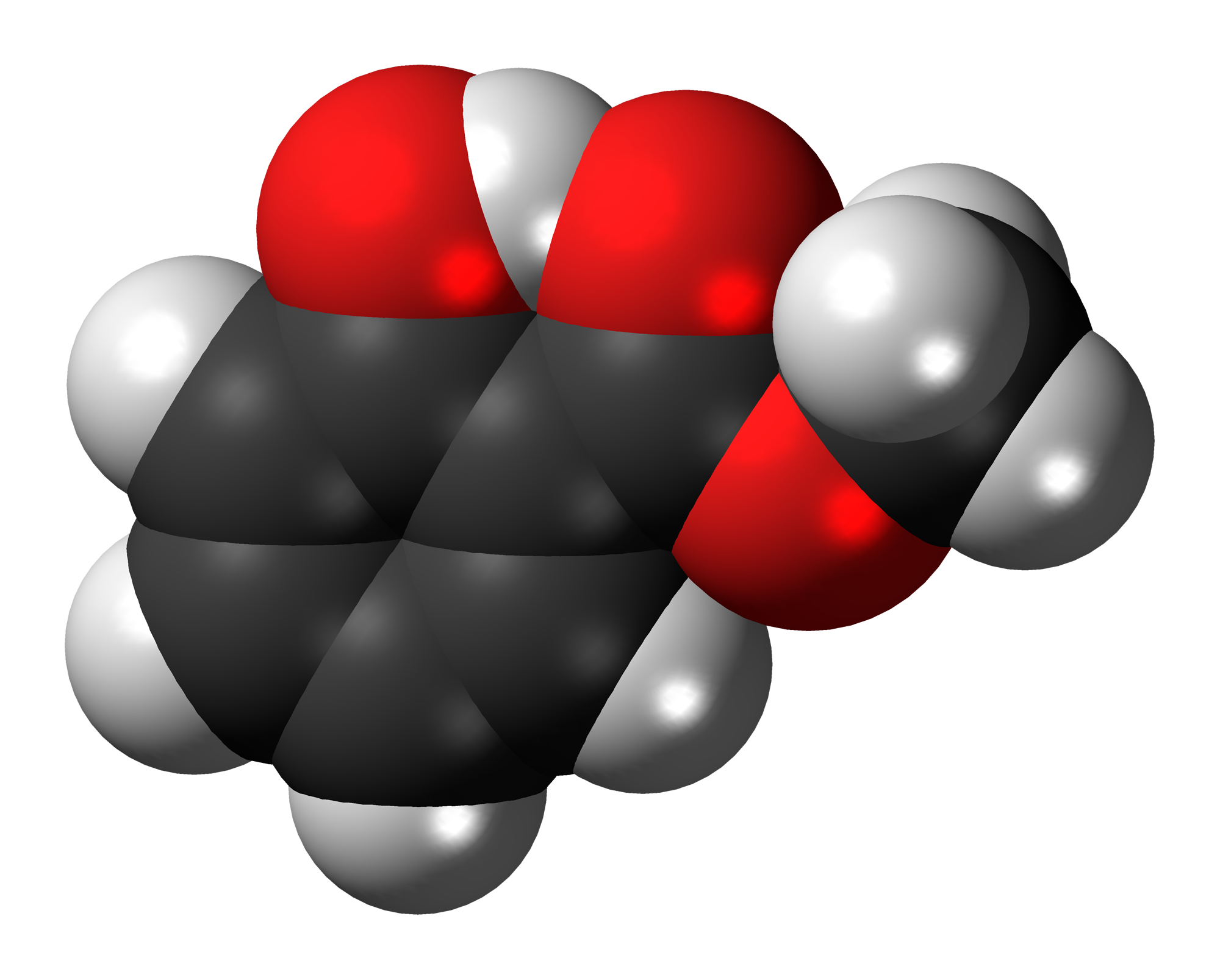

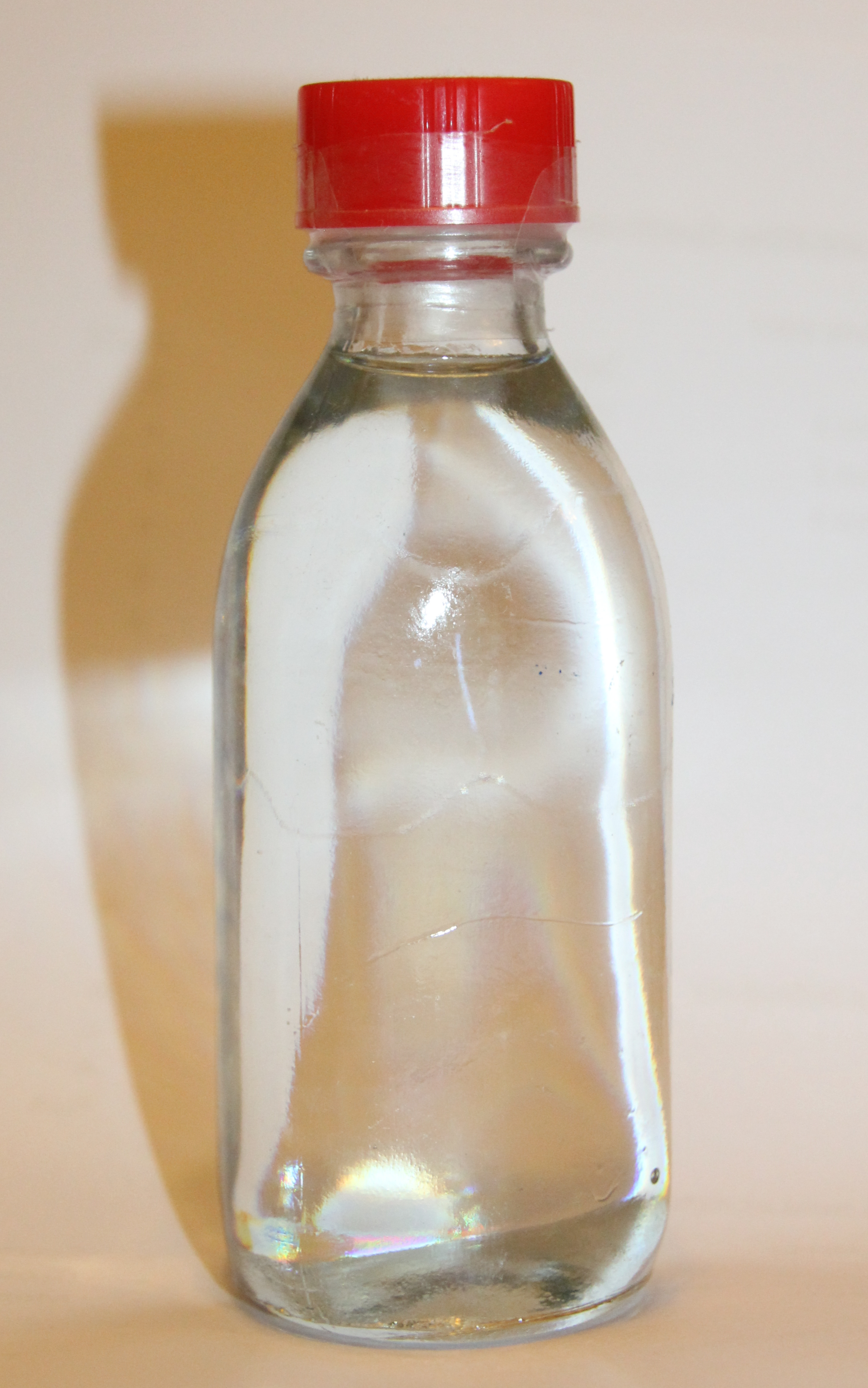

Names
- Preferred IUPAC name Methyl 2-hydroxybenzoate
- Other names: Salicylic acid methyl ester; Oil of wintergreen; Betula oil

Identifiers
CAS Number	119-36-8
3D model (JSmol)	Interactive image
ChEBI	CHEBI:31832
ChEMBL	ChEMBL108545
ChemSpider	13848808
ECHA InfoCard	100.003.925
EC Number	204-317-7
IUPHAR/BPS	2431
KEGG	D01087
PubChem CID	4133
RTECS number	VO4725000
UNII	LAV5U5022Y
CompTox Dashboard (EPA)	DTXSID5025659
- InChI: InChI=1S/C8H8O3/c1-11-8(10)6-4-2-3-5-7(6)9/h2-5,9H,1H3 Key: OSWPMRLSEDHDFF-UHFFFAOYSA-N; InChI=1/C8H8O3/c1-11-8(10)6-4-2-3-5-7(6)9/h2-5,9H,1H3 Key: OSWPMRLSEDHDFF-UHFFFAOYAD
- SMILES: O=C(OC)c1ccccc1O

Properties
Chemical formula	C_{8}H_{8}O_{3}
Molar mass	152.149 g·mol^{−1}
Appearance	Colorless liquid
Odor	Wintergreen
Density	1.181 g/cm^{3}
Melting point	−8.6 °C (16.5 °F; 264.5 K)
Boiling point	222.6 °C (432.7 °F; 495.8 K) Decomposes at 340–350 °C (644–662 °F; 613–623 K)
Critical point (T, P)	709 K (436 °C; 817 °F), 4.4 MPa
Solubility in water	0.639 g/L (21 °C (70 °F; 294 K)); 0.697 g/L (30 °C (86 °F; 303 K))
Solubility	Very soluble in chloroform, ethanol, and diethyl ether.
Solubility in acetone	10.1 g/g (30 °C (86 °F; 303 K))
log P	2.55
Vapor pressure	1 Pa (0.0075 mmHg) (−1 °C (30 °F; 272 K)); 10 Pa (0.075 mmHg) (22 °C (72 °F; 295 K)); 100 Pa (0.75 mmHg) (51 °C (124 °F; 324 K)); 1 kPa (7.5 mmHg) (88.8 °C (191.8 °F; 361.9 K)); 10 kPa (75 mmHg) (141.8 °C (287.2 °F; 414.9 K)); 100 kPa (750 mmHg) (219.9 °C (427.8 °F; 493.0 K))
Acidity (pK_{a})	9.8
Magnetic susceptibility (χ)	−86.3×10^{−6} cm^{3}/mol
Refractive index (n_{D})	1.535 (20 °C (68 °F; 293 K))
Viscosity	1.535 mPa·s; 1.102 mPa·s (75 °C (167 °F))
Dipole moment	2.47 D

Thermochemistry
Heat capacity (C)	249.0 J⋅mol^{−1}·K^{-1}
Enthalpy of vaporization (Δ_{f}H_{vap})	46.7 kJ⋅mol^{−1} (222.6 °C (432.7 °F))

Hazards
- GHS labelling
Pictograms	(GHS08: Health hazard) (GHS05: Corrosive) (GHS07: Exclamation mark)
Signal word	Danger
Hazard statements	H302, H317, H318, H361, H412
Precautionary statements	P201, P202, P261, P264, P270, P272, P273, P280, P301+P312+P330, P302+P352, P305+P351+P338+P310, P308+P313, P333+P313, P363, P405, P501
NFPA 704 (fire diamond)	3 1 0
Flash point	96 °C (205 °F; 369 K)
Autoignition temperature	452.7 °C (846.9 °F; 725.8 K)
- Lethal dose or concentration (LD, LC)
LD_{50} (median dose)	887 mg/kg (oral, rat)
- Except where otherwise noted, data are given for materials in their standard state (at 25 °C [77 °F], 100 kPa). verify (what is ?) Infobox references

Methyl salicylate (oil of wintergreen or wintergreen oil) is an organic compound with the formula C_{8}H_{8}O_{3}. It is the methyl ester of salicylic acid. It is a colorless, viscous liquid with a sweet, fruity odor reminiscent of root beer (in which it is used as a flavoring), but often associatively called "minty", as it is an ingredient in mint candies. It is produced by many species of plants, particularly wintergreens. It is also produced synthetically, used as a fragrance and as a flavoring agent.

== Biosynthesis and occurrence ==
Methyl salicylate was first isolated (from the plant Gaultheria procumbens) in 1843 by the French chemist Auguste André Thomas Cahours (1813–1891), who identified it as an ester of salicylic acid and methanol.

The biosynthesis of methyl salicylate arises via the hydroxylation of benzoic acid by a cytochrome P450 followed by reaction with a methyltransferase enzyme.

== Methyl salicylate as a plant metabolite ==
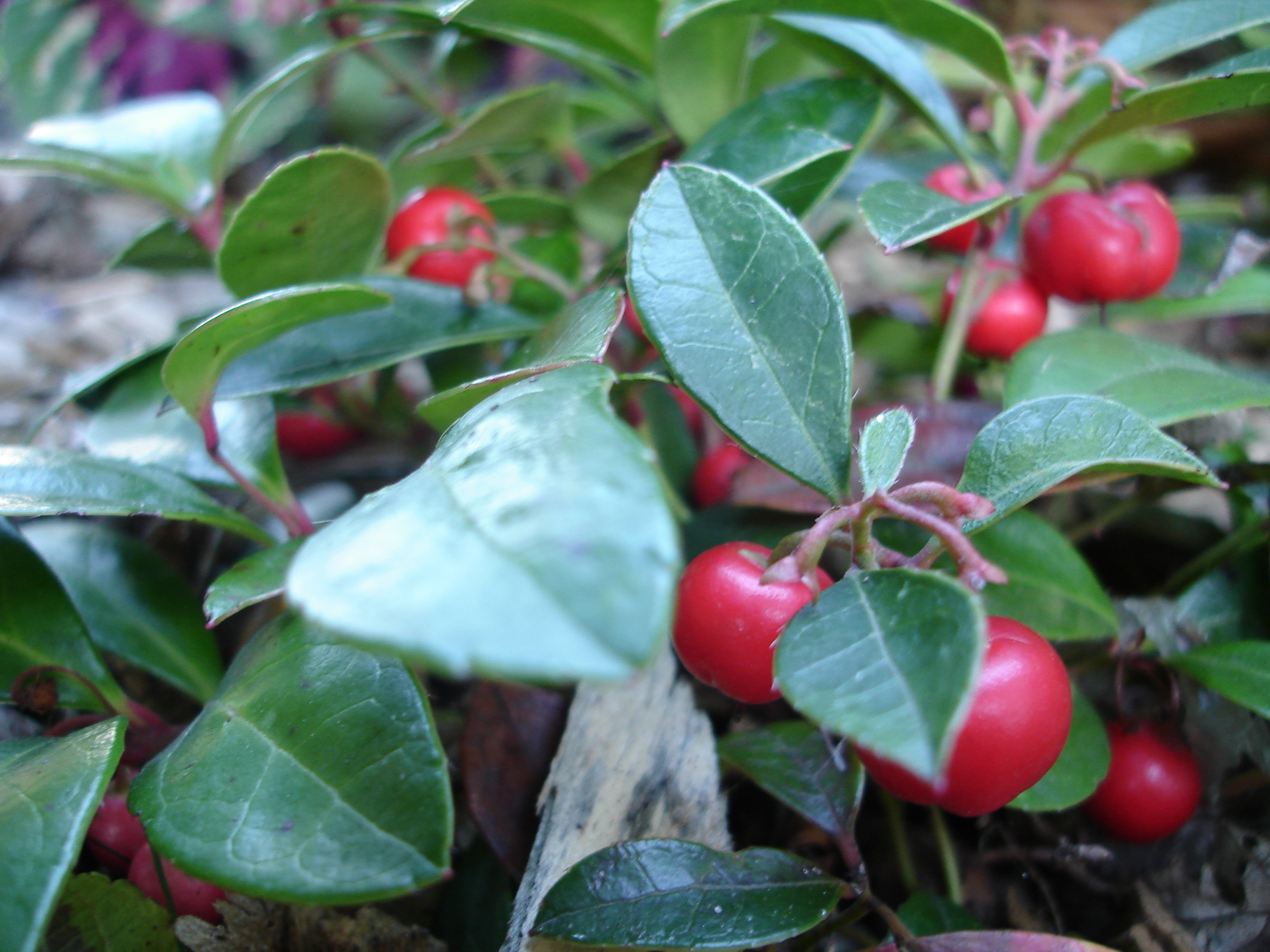
Wintergreen plants (Gaultheria procumbens)

Many plants produce methyl salicylate in small quantities. Methyl salicylate levels are often upregulated in response to biotic stress, especially infection by pathogens, where it plays a role in the induction of resistance. Methyl salicylate is believed to function by being metabolized to the plant hormone salicylic acid. Since methyl salicylate is volatile, these signals can spread through the air to distal parts of the same plant or even to neighboring plants, whereupon they can function as a mechanism of plant-to-plant communication, "warning" neighbors of danger. Methyl salicylate is also released in some plants when they are damaged by herbivorous insects, where they may function as a cue aiding in the recruitment of predators, notably hoverflies, lacewings, and lady beetles.

Some plants produce methyl salicylate in larger quantities, where it likely involved in direct defense against predators or pathogens. Examples of this latter class include: some species of the genus Gaultheria in the family Ericaceae, including Gaultheria procumbens, the wintergreen or eastern teaberry; some species of the genus Betula in the family Betulaceae, particularly those in the subgenus Betulenta such as B. lenta, the black birch; all species of the genus Spiraea in the family Rosaceae, also called the meadowsweets; species of the genus Polygala in the family Polygalaceae. Methyl salicylate can also be a component of floral scents, especially in plants dependent on nocturnal pollinators like moths, scarab beetles, and (nocturnal) bees.

== Commercial production ==
Methyl salicylate can be produced by esterifying salicylic acid with methanol. Commercial methyl salicylate is now synthesized, but in the past, it was commonly distilled from the twigs of Betula lenta (sweet birch) and Gaultheria procumbens (eastern teaberry or wintergreen).

== Uses ==
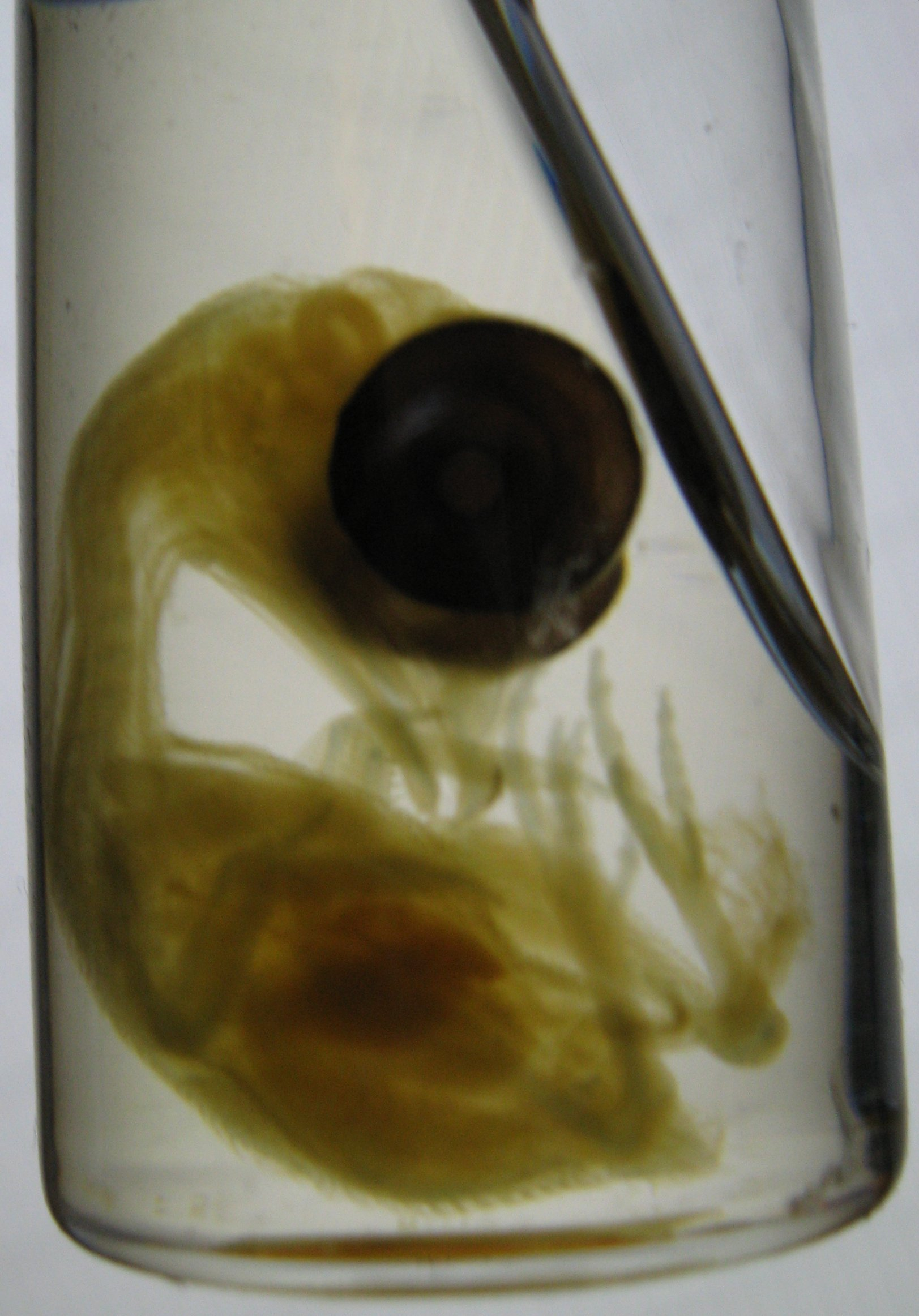
Chick embryo that was treated with methylene blue to stain the skeleton, then cleansed with two or three ethanol washes, and treated with methyl salicylate to make the surrounding tissues transparent

Methyl salicylate is used in high concentrations as a rubefacient and analgesic in deep heating liniments (such as Bengay) to treat joint and muscular pain. Randomised double blind trials report that evidence of its effectiveness is weak, but stronger for acute pain than chronic pain, and that effectiveness may be due entirely to counterirritation. However, in the body it metabolizes into salicylates, including salicylic acid, a known NSAID.

Methyl salicylate is used in low concentrations (0.04% and under) as a flavoring agent in root beer, chewing gum, mints and medicine such as Pepto-Bismol. Its aroma is described as "wintergreen, minty, sweet, root beer, aromatic, phenolic, camphoreous".

When mixed with sugar and dried, it is a source of triboluminescence, for example by crushing Wint-O-Green Life Savers in a dark room. When crushed, sugar crystals emit light; methyl salicylate amplifies the spark because it fluoresces, absorbing ultraviolet light and re-emitting it in the visible spectrum. It is used as an antiseptic in Listerine mouthwash produced by the Johnson & Johnson company. It provides fragrance to various products and as an odor-masking agent for some organophosphate pesticides.

Methyl salicylate is used as a bait for attracting male orchid bees for study, which apparently gather the chemical to synthesize pheromones. It has also been discovered that methyl salicylate works as a kairomone that attracts some insects, such as the spotted lanternfly. Unlike some other kairomones, methyl salicylate attracts all stages of the spotted lanternflies life.

It is also used to clear plant or animal tissue samples of color, and as such is useful for microscopy and immunohistochemistry when excess pigments obscure structures or block light in the tissue being examined. This clearing generally only takes a few minutes, but the tissue must first be dehydrated in alcohol.

Other niche uses include:

- As a simulant or surrogate for the research of chemical warfare agent sulfur mustard, due to its similar chemical and physical properties.
- Restoring (at least temporarily) the elastomeric properties of old rubber rollers, especially in printers.
- As a transfer agent in printmaking (to release toner from photocopied images and apply them to other surfaces).
- As a historical substitute for cedar oil as an immersion oil in microscopy, given its refractive index (1.538) being close to that of crown glass (1.515) and being less prone to evaporation than cedar oil.
- as a penetrating oil to loosen rusted parts.

== Safety and toxicity ==
Most instances of human toxicity due to methyl salicylate are a result of overapplication of topical analgesics, as skin absorption occurs easily. Salicylic acid, the major metabolite of methyl salicylate, may accumulate in blood which may help professionals to confirm a diagnosis of poisoning in hospitalized patients.

=== Incidents ===
A 17 year old Staten Island high school track star died in April 2007 after overdose of methyl salicylate by excessive use of topical muscle-pain relief products.

== Compendial status ==
- British Pharmacopoeia
- Japanese Pharmacopoeia

== See also ==
- Methyl benzoate
- Trolamine salicylate
