= Calorad =

Liquid protein weight loss supplement

Calorad Classic is a liquid protein weight loss supplement which was first introduced to the US and Canadian marketplace in 1984. It has been advertised on both television and radio. Calorad Classic is manufactured by NutriDiem and is marketed by several companies including Essentially Yours Industries and Nysante, all of which are headquartered in Canada.

== Composition ==
Calorad Classic is a liquid dietary supplement composed primarily of 3,000 mg (3 grams) of Type II hydrolyzed collagen (hydrolysate) from either beef (bovine) or tuna (marine) sources and 8 mg of aloe vera, both of which are listed as active ingredients. The supplement label states that Calorad is fat-free and carbohydrate-free and that 1 serving (1/2 ounce) provides 3 grams of protein and 10 calories. Calorad Classic also comes in a Kosher formulation (marine). The primary claim made for the product is that regular use causes weight loss without loss of lean muscle mass. While weight loss and body fat reduction may be achieved simply by following the labeled instruction to avoid eating within three hours prior to sleep as that can result in eating fewer calories per day, most individuals fasting for 3-hours prior to bed-time alone are not successful in accomplishing long-term weight loss.

Formulator Michel Grise stated that the original version of what later became known as Calorad was developed to treat chickens with fatty liver syndrome. Chickens were developing so much body fat that they stopped laying eggs. The formulation was successful in helping farmers reduce body fat of chickens to get them laying eggs again. This led to the question of whether such a product would work for humans.

== Scientific studies ==
Although the manufacturer does not make claims for Calorad Classic in the treatment or cure of disease, the manufacturer does cite published clinical trials in OsteoArthritis and Osteoporosis, Rheumatoid Arthritis, and Fibromyalgia all conducted with Type II hydrolyzed collagen (collagen hydrolysate), the primary ingredient in Calorad.

The manufacturer claims that 40% of subjects will lose weight within 1 month, 75% after 2 months and 87% after 3 months. The distributors of the product offer a 30-day satisfaction guarantee. In support of these claims, the distributing companies cite a clinical study of Calorad (also unpublished and non-peer reviewed) by Joel B. Lao. Lao is a Doctor of Internal Medicine, and medical consultant in the Philippines who studied the effects of Calorad and its effect on overweight and/or obese individuals. The subjects included 50 overweight or obese individuals who were observed over a 90-day period. One bottle of Calorad was provided to each of the subjects every month for a 3-month period. In month 1, the average weight loss was 5.7 pounds. By month 3, subjects had an average reduction of 10 pounds, and an average inch loss at the waist of 3 inches.

The claim that Calorad Classic facilitates weight loss while building or maintaining lean muscle mass is based upon an unpublished and non-peer reviewed study by Davis et al. in which 300 subjects between the ages of 17–77 years, were followed for 1 year, and the majority of whom lost weight (an average of 3.75 pounds per month) but maintained lean muscle mass. Davis states: "We also found that in the entire group, less than 0.6, or less than 1 per cent, had any loss of lean muscle mass. And 36 per cent of the group actually gained lean muscle mass during that time."

== Marketing claims ==
One of the marketing companies, Essentially Yours, states that most subjects on a weight loss regimen lose lean muscle mass along with fat and water weight, so that maintaining lean muscle mass is a benefit seen with Calorad Classic users.

When first introduced, the manufacturer claimed that Calorad Classic could cause the user to "lose weight while you sleep", repair joints, and prevent or reduce the symptoms of arthritis. The manufacturer has since dropped these claims because they are "medical treatment claims" and require a drug treatment classification approved by the United States Food and Drug Administration, and are usually only granted following submission of large clinical trials similar to those conducted by pharmaceutical companies in substantiation of these claims. Neither the manufacturer (Nutridiem) or the distributing companies (Nysante or EYI) have conducted this type of rigorous trial on Calorad in support of such claims. The manufacturer and distributing companies have replaced these claims with the current claim that Calorad "promotes sleep and improves the health and appearance of hair, nails and skin" (all of which are not medical treatment claims).

Calorad Classic, like all nutritional supplements, has not been evaluated by the US Food and Drug Administration, and all marketing materials related to the product carry a disclaimer to the effect that it is "a food supplement and is not intended to diagnose, treat, cure, or prevent any disease."
