= Rubefacient =

Substance for topical application that produces redness of the skin

A rubefacient is a substance for topical application that produces redness of the skin, e.g. by causing dilation of the capillaries and an increase in blood circulation. It has sometimes been used to relieve acute or chronic pain, but there is limited evidence as to its efficacy, and as of 2014 the best evidence does not support using gels and creams containing rubefacients for this purpose.

== Examples ==
Common medicinal rubefacients include:

- Salicylates, such as methyl salicylate (oil of wintergreen)
- Nicotinate esters
- Capsaicin, derived from chili pepper, Capsicum minimum, "incites irritation without rubefaction"
- Isopropanol (rubbing alcohol)
- Menthol
- Minoxidil
- Thurfyl nicotinate (Trafuril)

Common herbal rubefacients include:

- Cloves (Syzygium aromaticum)
- Garlic (Allium sativum)
- Ginger (Zingiber officinale)
- Horseradish (Cochlearia armoracia)
- Mustard (Brassica alba or Brassica nigra)
- Nettle (Urtica dioica)
- Rue (Ruta graveolens)
- Peppermint (Mentha piperita)

== See also ==
- Liniment
