= Liniment =

Ointment-like medicated topical preparation

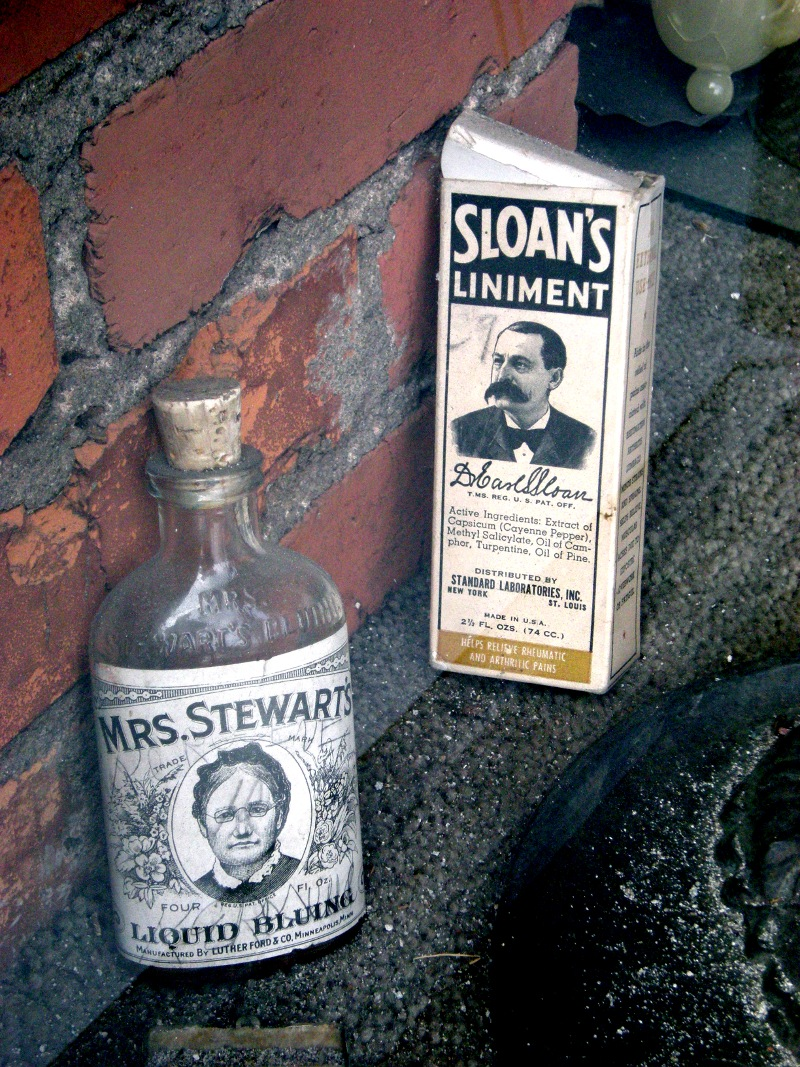
Sloan's Liniment (right) was once a popular over-the-counter drug.

Liniment (from Latin: linere, meaning "to smear, anoint"), also called embrocation and heat rub, is a medicated topical preparation for application to the skin. Some liniments have a viscosity similar to that of water; others are lotion or balm; still others are in transdermal patches, soft solid sticks, and sprays. Liniment usually is rubbed into the skin, which the active ingredients penetrate.

Liniments are typically sold to relieve pain and stiffness, such as from muscular aches and strains, and arthritis. These are typically formulated from alcohol, acetone, or similar quickly evaporating solvents and contain counterirritant aromatic chemical compounds, such as methyl salicylate, benzoin resin, menthol, and capsaicin. They produce a feeling of warmth within the muscle of the area they are applied to, typically acting as rubefacients via a counterirritant effect.

Methyl salicylate, which is the analgesic ingredient in some heat rubs, can be toxic if used in excess. Heating pads are also not recommended for use with heat rubs, because the added warmth may cause overabsorption of the active ingredients.

== Notable liniments ==
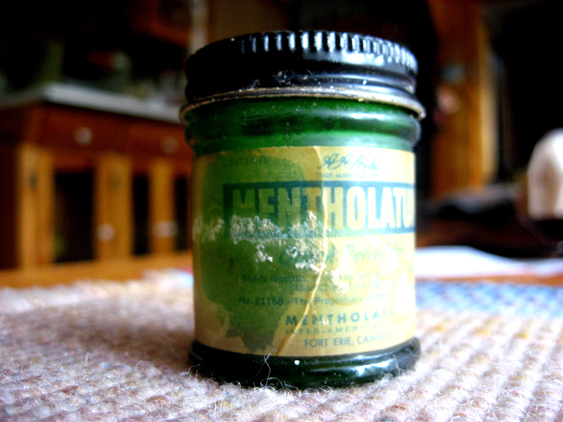
An old bottle of AA Hyde Mentholatum Ointment

- A.B.C. Liniment was used from approximately 1880 to 1935. It was named for its three primary ingredients: aconite, belladonna, and chloroform. There were numerous examples of poisoning from the mixture, resulting in at least one death.
- Amrutanjan is an analgesic balm manufactured by Amrutanjan Healthcare. It was created in 1893 by an Indian journalist, Kasinathuni Nageswara Rao.
- Bengay, spelled Ben-Gay before 1995, was developed in France by Dr. Jules Bengué, and brought to America in 1898. It was originally produced by Pfizer Consumer Healthcare, which was acquired by Johnson & Johnson.
- Dr. Cox's Barbed Wire Liniment and Antiseptic, made by Myers Laboratory. Marketed as treatment for minor wounds (contains iodine) for livestock and humans, such as barbed wire scratches.
- IcyHot is a line of liniments produced and marketed by Chattem, now a subsidiary of Sanofi.
- Mentholatum Ointment, branded Deep Heat outside of the US, was introduced in December 1894 and is still produced today with numerous variations.
- Minard's Liniment: Dr. Levi Minard of Nova Scotia, branded as "The King of Pain," created his well-known liniment from camphor, ammonia water, and medical turpentine.
- Nine oils: a 19th-century preparation used on both horses and humans. Although druggists' books sometimes specified recipes, street doctors often promoted any kind of oil as the "nine oils".
- Opodeldoc: invented by the Renaissance physician Paracelsus.
- RUB A535: introduced in 1919 and manufactured by Church & Dwight in Canada.
- Thermacare: Acquired in 2020 by Italy's Angelini when it was spun off following the merger of Pfizer with GlaxoSmithKline's consumer healthcare division.
- Tiger Balm was developed during the 1870s in Rangoon, Burma by herbalist Aw Chu Kin, and brought to market by his sons. It is composed of 16% menthol and 28% oil of wintergreen.
- Watkins Liniment: One of Watkins Incorporated's original products.

== Use on horses ==
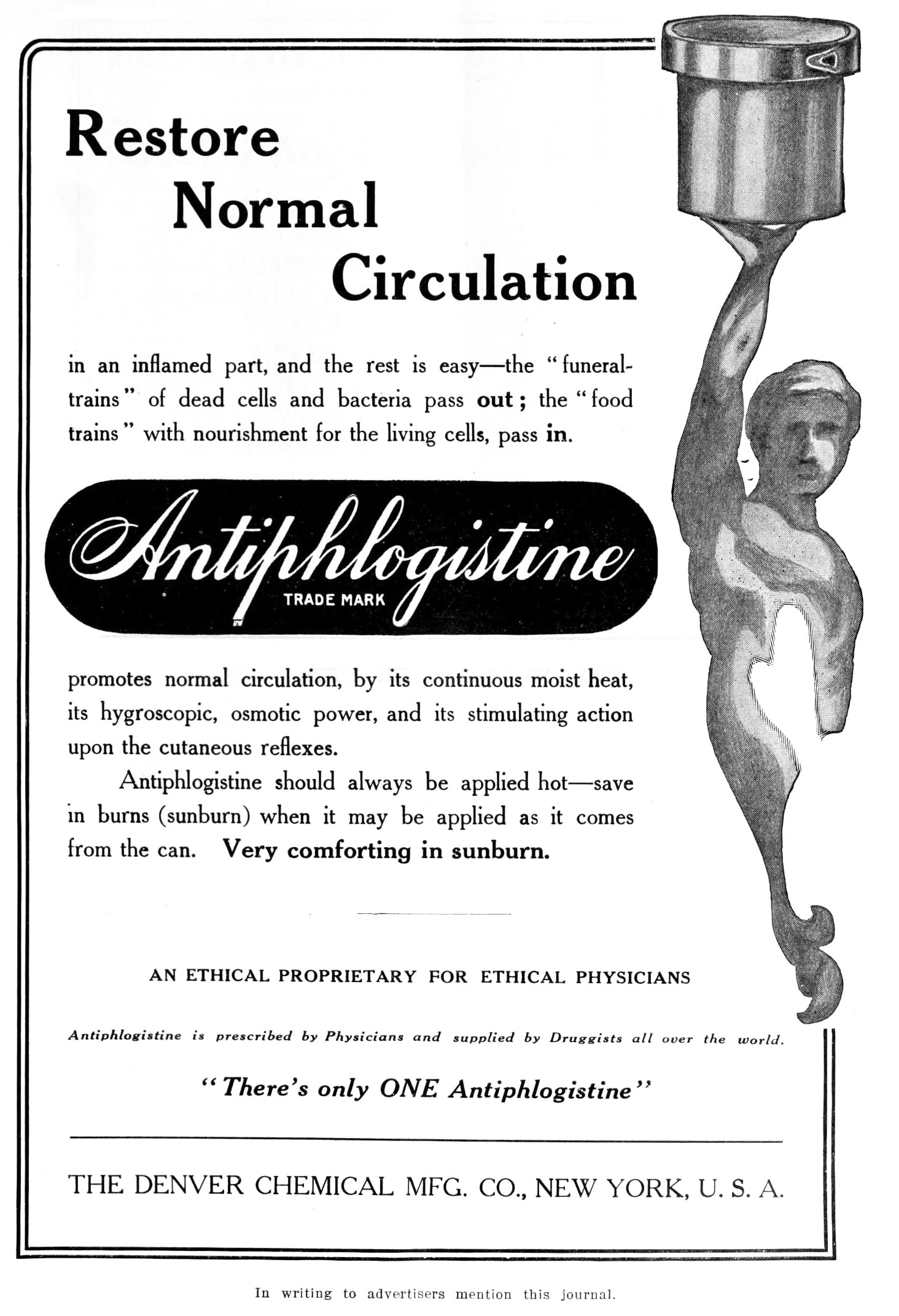
A 1914 advertisement for "Antiphlogistine"

Liniments are commonly used on horses following exercise, applied either by rubbing on full-strength, especially on the legs; or applied in a diluted form, usually added to a bucket of water and sponged on the body. They are used in hot weather to help cool down a horse after working, the alcohol cooling through rapid evaporation, and counterirritant oils dilating capillaries in the skin, increasing the amount of blood releasing heat from the body.

Many horse liniment formulas in diluted form have been used on humans, though products for horses which contain DMSO are not suitable for human use, as DMSO carries the topical product into the bloodstream. Horse liniment ingredients such as menthol, chloroxylenol, or iodine are also used in different formulas in products used by humans.

Absorbine, a horse liniment product manufactured by W.F. Young, Inc., was reformulated for humans and marketed as Absorbine Jr. The company also acquired other liniment brands including Bigeloil and RefreshMint. The equine version of Absorbine is sometimes used by humans, though, anecdotally, its benefits in humans may be because the smell of menthol releases serotonin, or due to a placebo effect.

Earl Sloan was an American entrepreneur who made his initial fortune selling his father's horse liniment formula beginning in the period following the Civil War. Sloan's liniment with capsicum as a key ingredient was also marketed for human use. He later sold his company to the predecessor of Warner–Lambert, which was purchased in 2000 by Pfizer.
