= Counterirritant =

Mild irritant used to lessen pain

A counterirritant is a substance which creates irritation or mild inflammation in one location with the goal of lessening discomfort and/or inflammation in another location. This strategy falls into the more general category of counterstimulation.

Topical counter-irritants are non-analgesic, non-anesthetic substances or treatments used to treat pain. Capsaicin, menthol (mint oil), methyl salicylate, and camphor are examples of counterirritants. Heat and cold therapy and massage relieve pain by counterstimulation.

The US Food and Drug Administration defines a counterirritant as "An externally applied substance that causes irritation or mild inflammation of the skin for the purpose of relieving pain in muscles, joints and viscera distal to the site of application. They differ from the anesthetics, analgesics, and antipruritic agents, however, in that the pain relief they produce results from stimulation—rather than depression—of the cutaneous sensory receptors and occurs in structures of the body other than the skin areas to which they are applied as for example, in joints, muscles, tendons and certain viscera. The use of these products dates from antiquity."
