= Isobel Cripps =

British aristocrat (1891–1979)

Dame Isobel Cripps Lady Cripps GBE
- Born: 25 January 1891; Denham, Buckinghamshire, England
- Died: 11 April 1979 (aged 88)
- Occupation: British overseas aid organiser
- Spouse: Stafford Cripps (m. 1911; died 1952)
- Parents: Harold William Swithinbank (father); Amy Eno (mother)
- Relatives: Sir John Stafford Cripps (son); Peggy Cripps (daughter); Sir Robert Cornwallis (son-in-law); Joe Appiah (son-in-law); Kwame Anthony Appiah (grandson); James Crossley Eno (maternal grandfather)

Dame Isobel Cripps, GBE (née Swithinbank; 25 January 1891 – 11 April 1979), also known as Isobel, the Honourable Lady Cripps, was a British overseas aid organiser and the wife of the Honourable Sir Stafford Cripps.

== Life ==
Born at Denham, Buckinghamshire, she was the youngest of three children of Commander Harold William Swithinbank FRSE DL (1858–1928) and Amy Eno, the daughter of James Crossley Eno. She was educated at the Heathfield School, near Ascot.

Swithinbank met Stafford Cripps in January 1910. The couple married on 12 July 1911 at Denham parish church and had four children:

- Sir John Stafford Cripps (1912–1993)
- Isobel Diana Cripps (1913–1985)
- (Anne) Theresa Cripps (1919–1998), who was married to Sir Robert Cornwallis Gerald St. Leger Ricketts, 7th Bt.
- Peggy Cripps, born Enid Margaret Cripps (1921–2006), children's author and philanthropist, who married the Ghanaian lawyer and statesman Nana Joe Appiah; their son is the philosopher Kwame Anthony Appiah (b. 1954).

She was a governor of The Peckham Experiment in 1949 and a Vice President of the Electrical Association for Women.

== Sources ==
- Watson, Colin. "Cripps, Dame Isobel, Lady Cripps (1891–1979)". Oxford Dictionary of National Biography (online ed.). Oxford University Press. doi:10.1093/ref:odnb/30983. (Subscription, Wikipedia Library access or UK public library membership required.)
