= Cripps–Appiah–Edun family =

Euro-African dynasty

The Cripps–Appiah–Edun family is a prominent political dynasty. Of mixed origins, its members have been influential in Britain (where the Crippses hold a peerage and have provided a chancellor of the exchequer), Ghana (where the Appiahs hold a chieftaincy and have provided a permanent representative to the United Nations), and Nigeria (where the Eduns have held several chieftaincies and have provided a minister of finance).

The family's earliest patriarchs on each of its three main lines were the British barrister and peer Charles Cripps, 1st Baron Parmoor (3 October 1852 – 30 June 1941), the Nigerian official Adegboyega Edun (July 22, 1860 – c.1925), and the Ghanaian traditional leader J.W.K. Appiah (fl. c.1950s).

== History ==
The Cripps family has long lived in the Gloucestershire region of England; they are a solidly upper-class family that claims direct descent from King William the Conqueror. The founder of the noble branch, Lord Parmoor, was a lawyer who was first ennobled in 1914, upon becoming a member of the Judicial Committee of the Privy Council. His grandfather Joseph Cripps and uncle William Cripps were both MPs for Cirencester. Lord Parmoor had represented Stroud in the House of Commons.

The family also has links, through Lord Parmoor, to the politicians Henry Hobhouse, Leonard, Lord Courtney, Sidney Webb, Lord Passfield and his wife Beatrice. Through his son Sir Stafford Cripps meanwhile, they are likewise connected to the family of the Boston Brahmin founding patriarch John Winthrop in the United States.

The Cripps family were traditionally devout Anglicans. Lord Parmoor was an ecclesiastical lawyer, a member —and in 1911 the Chairman — of the House of Laymen in the province of Canterbury, Vicar General of various English provinces, and author of Cripps on Church and Clergy. Sir Stafford Cripps is said to have been the first layman to preach in St Paul's Cathedral.

The Appiahs trace their descent to Nana J.W.K. Appiah, a traditional figure and anti-colonial activist who served as secretary of the Ashanti Confederacy in colonial Ghana. One of his wives, Adwoa Akyaa, was herself a member of the Akroma-Ampim chieftaincy abusua of Nyaduom, an Ashanti town, a fact which led to their son Nana Joe Appiah rising to the headship of this abusua upon the death of its chief Yaw Anthony. He would also serve, at various times, as a government minister, an ambassador, a party chieftain and a legal administrator following his country's independence.

The family were originally Methodists, with J.W.K. Appiah serving for a time as leader of the community of believers in his region of Ghana.

The Edun family, of Egba and Saro origin, claim descent from the Hon. Adegboyega Edun. He was a Christian clergyman who renounced the ministry in 1902 in order to become the secretary of the Egba United Government, a Yoruba political entity which was guaranteed its sovereignty by the British for a time in the early 20th century. His grandson, Chief Wale Edun, would later continue the family tradition of government service by becoming a minister in the Tinubu administration during Nigeria's fourth republic.

Through the 1921 society wedding of Gertrude Olajumoke Edun, daughter of the Hon. Mr. Edun, and Olayimika Alakija, brother of the politician Sir Adeyemo Alakija, the Eduns came to be related to such figures as Sir Adetokunbo Ademola, Nigeria's premier chief justice (whose mother was an Alakija) and Chief Folorunsho Alakija, who is currently the country's richest woman (and whose husband is also an Alakija).

The Eduns were traditionally Methodists as well, with the Hon. Mr. Edun having been an ordained minister of the Wesleyan church and headmaster of one of its schools prior to his work in government. Their family name was initially Samuel prior to the re-adoption of their ancestral surname in 1902.

== The Cripps–Appiah wedding (1953) ==
The wedding of the Ghanaian law student Joe Appiah and the British debutante Peggy Cripps, which took place in 1953, was widely considered to be Britain's first interracial society wedding. It was also the means through which the African branches of the clan were first connected to the Cripps family.

The groom was a member of a prominent Ghanaian family of traditional leaders; his sister Victoria would go on to be the consort of the Asantehene of the Ashantis, and when their great uncle later died, he succeeded him as the abusuapanyin of the Akroma-Ampim family within that ethnic group. The bride, meanwhile, was herself the daughter of Sir Stafford Cripps, a Labour cabinet minister and a son of Lord Parmoor.

== Symbolism ==
Coat of arms of the Cripps family
Crest An ostrich’s head couped Argent gorged with a coronet of fleurs-de-lis and holding in the beak a horseshoe Or. Escutcheon Chequy Ermines and Argent on a chevron Vert five horseshoes Or. Supporters On either side a seahorse Proper supporting a pennon Ermines charged with a swan rousand Argent beaked and legged Gules ducally gorged and lined Or Motto Fronti Nulla Fides (English: Trust not outward appearances)

=== Other symbols ===
- An image of a pen in the act of writing, the symbol that was on the award given by the Egba United Government to the Edun family's founder Adegboyega Edun in 1912 in recognition of his service to the Egbas.

== Gallery ==
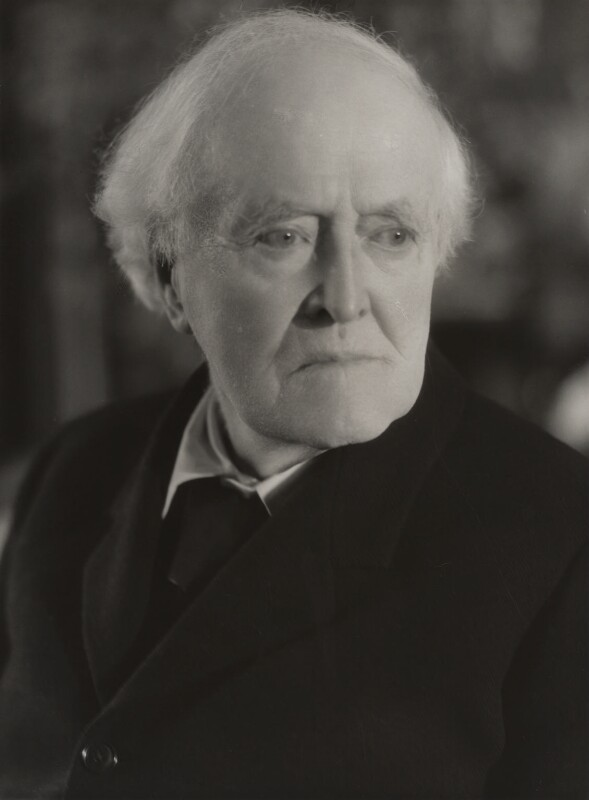
Charles, Lord Parmoor, a leader of the House of Lords, founder of the Cripps line of British peers

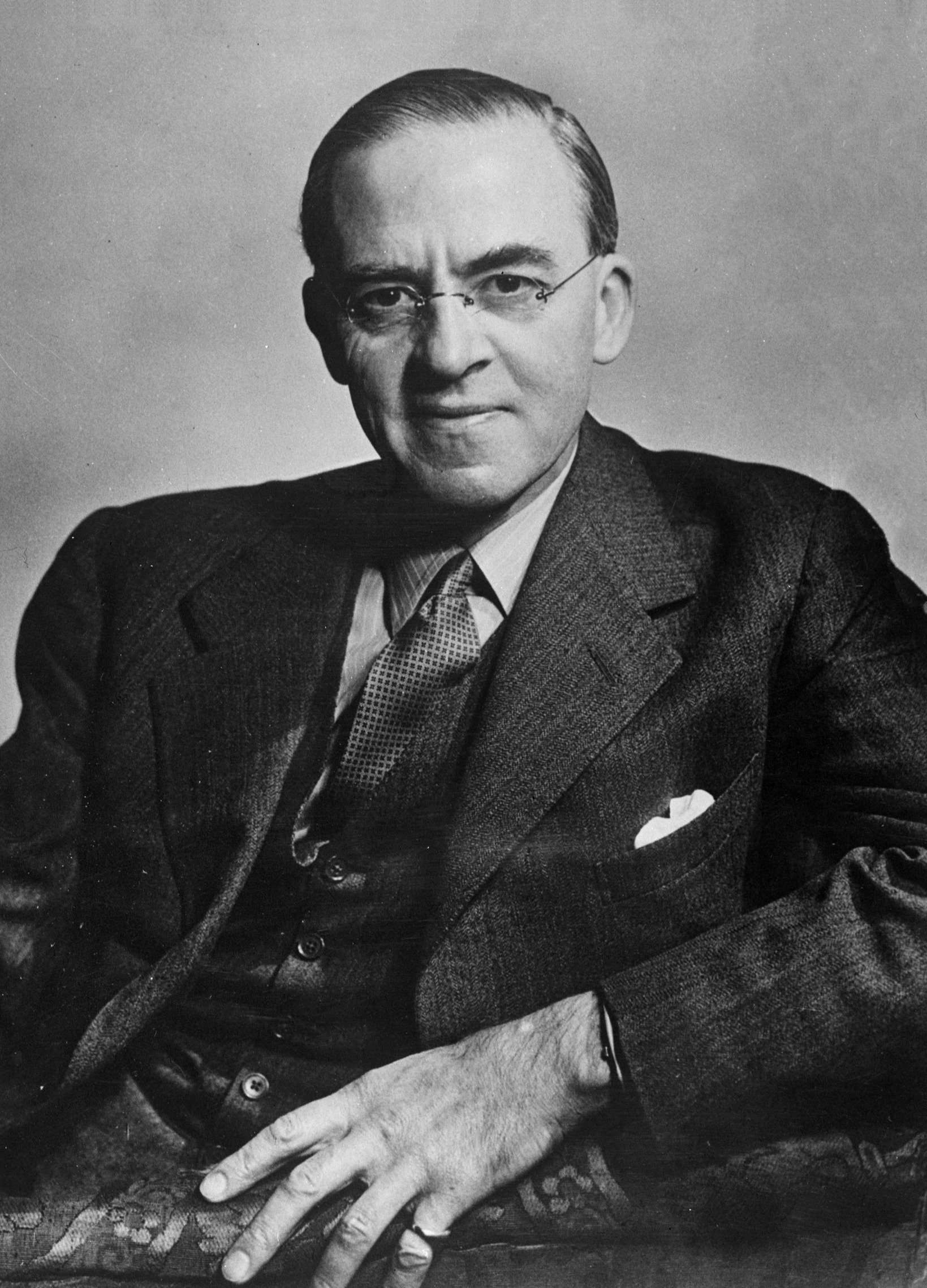
Sir Stafford Cripps, a chancellor of the exchequer, member of the Cripps family

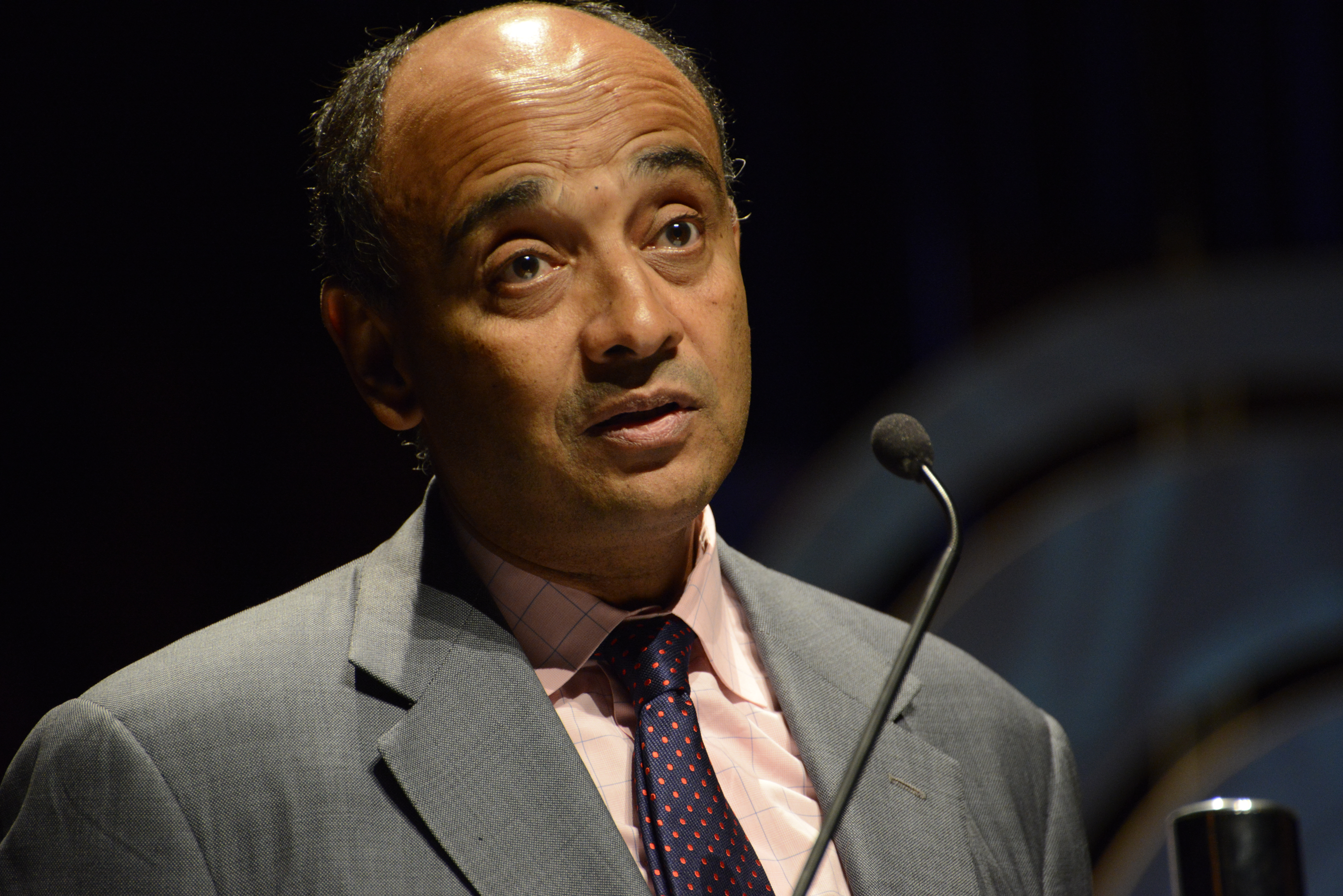
Chief Kwame Anthony Appiah, a philosopher and academic, member of the Appiah and Cripps families

Chief Wale Edun, a minister of finance, member of the Edun family and a Cripps-Appiah by marriage

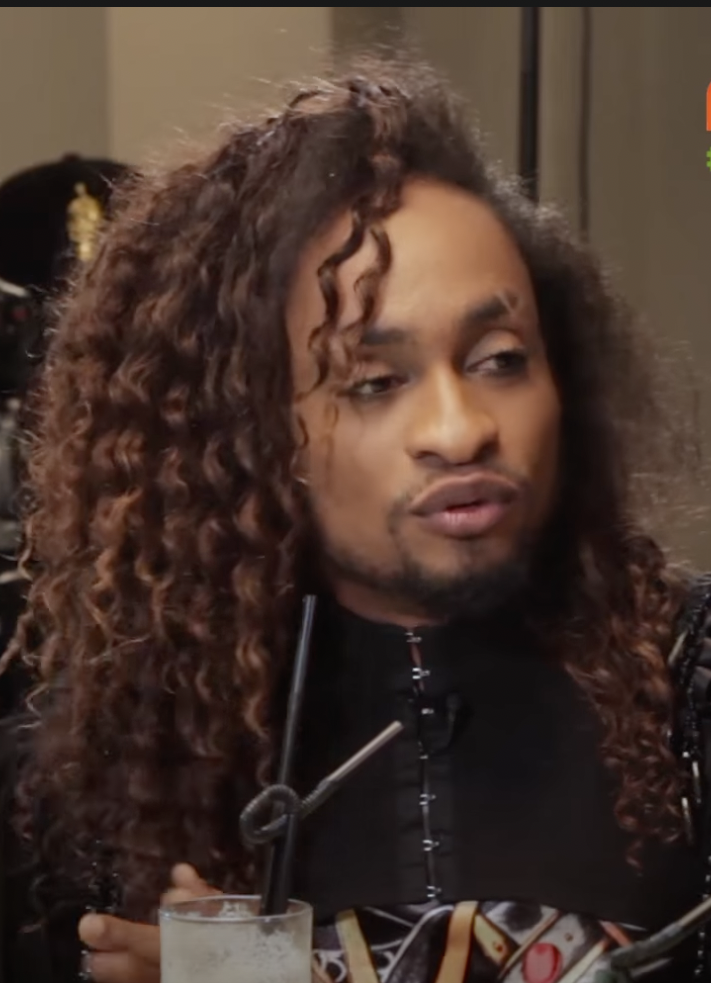
Denrele Edun, a TV host, member of the Edun family

== See also ==
- Ransome-Kuti family
- Vaughan family
