= Peggy Cripps =

English debutante and author (1921–2006)

- Born: Enid Margaret Cripps; 21 May 1921; Goodfellows, Gloucestershire, England
- Died: 11 February 2006 (aged 84); Kumasi, Ghana
- Burial place: Tafo cemetery in Kumasi
- Spouse: Nana Joe Appiah
- Parents: Rt Hon. Sir Stafford Cripps (father); Dame Isobel Cripps (mother)

Enid Margaret "Peggy" Appiah (née Cripps), MBE (/ˈæpiɑː/ AP-ee-ah; 21 May 1921 – 11 February 2006), was a British children's author, philanthropist and socialite.

The youngest daughter of the Rt Hon. Sir Stafford and Dame Isobel Cripps, she was the wife of Ghanaian lawyer and political activist Nana Joe Appiah, and mother of the philosopher Kwame Anthony Appiah.

== Early life ==
The youngest of four children, Enid Margaret Cripps was born at Goodfellows in Gloucestershire, just across the county border from the home of her parents, Stafford Cripps and Isobel (née) Swithinbank, in the village of Filkins, Oxfordshire.

The family had only recently moved into Goodfellows, the home in Filkins where Peggy grew up; a Cotswold-style manor house, whose decoration and development owed much to the influence of Sir Lawrence Weaver, the architect, who was, with his wife Kathleen, one of the Cripps' closest friends. Lady Weaver died in 1927 of pneumonia. When Sir Lawrence also died in 1930, their two sons, Purcell and Toby, were, in effect, adopted by the Cripps. In later life, Peggy always regarded them as her brothers.

=== Childhood ===
Growing up in the countryside, in the care of her mother, her beloved nanny, Elsie Lawrence, and with the companionship of her sister Theresa, she spent much of her childhood exploring the English countryside, collecting the wild flowers, fruits, and mushrooms that grew in the hedgerows and meadows of the 500 acres (2.0 km^{2}) of her father's farm and surrounding woods and fields. As members of the British Wildflower Society, she and her sister learned how to identify plants and got to know the common and Latin names of many. She would go on to transfer this interest in her later years to the flora of Ghana. This love of nature united her family. Her brother, Sir John Cripps, not only farmed at Filkins, but edited The Countryman and was later the European Countryside Commissioner.

=== Family ===
On her father's side, the family had long lived in Gloucestershire: they were a solidly upper class family that claimed direct descent from William the Conqueror. Her paternal grandfather, Lord Parmoor, was a lawyer ennobled in 1914, upon becoming a member of the Judicial Committee of the Privy Council. Her paternal great-great-grandfather was Joseph Cripps, MP for Cirencester. Lord Parmoor had represented Stroud in the House of Commons.

The political connections of her paternal side were impressive. Two of her paternal grandmother's sisters were married to the MPs Henry Hobhouse and Leonard Courtney. Another great-aunt, Beatrice, was married to Sidney Webb, who served with her grandfather Charles Cripps later Lord Parmoor in the first Labour Government, in 1924, and was Secretary of State for the Colonies in the second Labour Government in 1929, where he served in Cabinet with Lord Parmoor, as Lord President of the Council, and was joined later by Stafford, as Solicitor General. (It was at this time that her father was knighted.) Through her maternal ancestor Admiral George Winthrop, she was descended from the Winthrop family of Boston Brahmins in British North America.

The Cripps family were devout Anglicans. Lord Parmoor was an ecclesiastical lawyer, a member—and in 1911 the Chairman—of the House of Laymen in the Province of Canterbury, Vicar General of various English provinces, and author of Cripps on Church and Clergy. Stafford Cripps is said to have been the first layman to preach in St Paul's Cathedral. When Peggy Cripps was preparing for her confirmation, she told her parents that she had doubts about some of the 39 articles of faith of the Church of England, and her father arranged for her to discuss them with his friend, William Temple, Archbishop of York (later Archbishop of Canterbury). Peggy used to enjoy telling people that as they had gone through the 39 articles, each time she had expressed a doubt, the Archbishop had said, "Yes, I find that one very difficult, too!"

=== Education ===
She had a conventional education for a young woman of her class and time. She was educated first at a day school at Queen's College, London, based in Harley Street, and later at Maltman's Green, a boarding school in Buckinghamshire, where she and a group of friends attended a Quaker Meeting House. Through her parents' connections, she also began to learn something of the world outside England. In 1938 she and her family spent several months in Jamaica, and in the same year Jawaharlal Nehru, with whom Stafford had begun an extensive correspondence as a result of his interest in the development of democracy in the British colonies, visited Goodfellows with his daughter Indira.

=== "Off to study" ===
After finishing school, she applied to Edinburgh University, but first went off to Italy to study the history of art in Florence. The Second World War was looming, forcing her hurriedly home to England. She declined her place at Edinburgh University, enrolling instead at Whitehall Secretarial College, which had been evacuated to Dorset with the onset of bombing in London, so she could start work immediately.

Once she had completed her training, she was able to set off to join her father in Moscow, where he was the British ambassador and she was able to be useful as a secretary in the embassy. Because the direct route to Moscow would have required travelling through German-occupied Europe, she and her mother and her sister Theresa, travelled to Russia by way of Canada, crossing the continent on the Canadian Pacific Railway, then passing through Japan and China before crossing the Soviet Union by rail.

In Moscow, Peggy worked as secretary for her father and became friends with the daughters of the Yugoslav and Chinese ambassadors, and the daughter of an Iranian diplomat, who was to remain a lifelong friend. In 1941, at the age of 20, with her parents in London, and her sister in Iran, she was left in charge of the evacuation of the British Embassy, with the German invasion of Russia imminent. Since she was officially a secretary in the Foreign Service, she found herself working for a man named Mr. Cook in the consular department in Teheran. Later on, when the British Army took over the Iranian railway system, she worked as a secretary for the Brigadier who was in charge.

In 1942, she returned to England with her father, who was returning from a visit to India. They travelled through the Middle East on a seaplane, landing on Lake Galilee in British Mandate of Palestine and the Nile in Egypt, where she was able to see the pyramids of Egypt. This was also her first visit to the African continent. For the rest of the war she worked in the Ministry of Information, first in the Indian Division and then in the Soviet Relations Division, where she was able to use her knowledge of the Russian language in her work. As this happened, her father committed himself full-time to politics. Due to the reduced income that came with the loss of his legal practice, the family left Goodfellows and moved into a smaller house at Frith Hill, Gloucestershire, although her brother John eventually took over the running of the farm at Filkins.

At the end of WWII, Peggy had a nervous breakdown. She had given up her place at university to be useful during the war; now she found herself experienced but unqualified for the job she was already doing. She was sent to Switzerland to recover at the Maximilian Bircher-Benner clinic in Zurich, spent a summer in Lugano studying painting, and returned to London to take up the study of art full-time at the Anglo-French Art Centre in St John's Wood, north London. She then took up painting in a small studio in the apartment of artist Feliks Topolski and attended life-classes at Hammersmith Art School, under the tutelage of Carel Weight.

Throughout this period she was in close and regular touch with her parents, even though her father was increasingly busy with politics. With the Labour Party victory in the 1945 election, Stafford had joined the Cabinet as President of the Board of Trade, where he spent most of his time working on negotiations with the leaders of the Indian independence movement, including Gandhi, Nehru and Jinnah. In November 1947, he became Chancellor of the Exchequer and most of the rest of his life he helped to manage the beginnings of the post-War recovery of Britain and the creation of the modern welfare state.

In 1942, her mother had agreed to lead a campaign to raise money for aid to the people of China, who were facing great suffering as a result of the Japanese invasion, floods, disease and famine. Six years later, the Chinese government invited Lady Cripps to visit their country so that she could see what was being done with the money and express their gratitude for the work of British United Aid to China. Peggy went along as one of her mother's travelling companions. Since the money was meant to be used to help all the Chinese, they both stayed with General and Madame Chiang Kai-shek at their home. She visited the Communist "Liberated Areas" in Yan'an, where Peggy met Zhou Enlai and Madame Mao. On their way back from China, she and her mother travelled through Burma and India.

=== Engagement ===
As a result of her experiences in Jamaica, Russia, Iran, China, Burma and India, and her family's friendship with people such as the Nehrus, Peggy, who was now in her mid-twenties, knew many people from many countries and also knew much more about life outside England, indeed outside Europe, than most of her contemporaries. This experience, along with her deep Christian commitments, led her to work for co-operation among peoples; so in the early 1950s she started to work for an organization called Racial Unity, which had been started by Miss Mary Attlee, sister of the Prime Minister, in 1951, as well as becoming active in the Youth Department of the World Council of Churches (WCC). It was through her work for Racial Unity, of which she was secretary in 1952, that she first met Joseph Emmanuel Appiah, who was President of the West African Students' Union. Their friendship grew fast and in January 1952, he proposed and she accepted.

== Ghana ==
Much to her surprise, Joe was already at home in Kumasi when she arrived, having flown back urgently on the death of his granduncle, Yaw Anthony, whom he was to succeed as head of his branch of the nobility of the Ashanti people. She travelled to Kumasi on Christmas Eve 1952, where she was reunited with her fiancé, and met his family, for the first time, with him, on Christmas Day. On New Year's Eve she attended the Watch Night Service at the Wesley Methodist Church in Kumasi, worshiping for the first time in the church which was to celebrate her funeral more than fifty years later. She also visited the campus of what was to be Kwame Nkrumah University of Science and Technology, then a one-year-old teacher's training college, for the first time; a campus where she was to send her children to primary school and where, at the age of 84, in the last year of her life, she received an honorary degree of Doctor of Letters, to her great delight.

=== At home ===
On her first trip to Africa, she travelled as far north as Navrongo, crossed the Volta and entered French Togoland, in the east, and travelled to Elmina in the west. There was much speculation as to what she was doing in Ghana, and because the engagement had not been announced, she could not explain the real reason for her visit. She told the Daily Graphic: "[As] a member of a political family in Britain, I am very interested in the people of the Gold Coast and in their political advancement." Together with her future husband's family she met many prominent Ghanaians, including the Asantehene, Mrs. Rose Aggrey (wife of Dr James Aggrey, a co-founder of Achimota School), the artist Kofi Antubam, paramount chief Nene Mate Kole, as well as such leaders of the independence movement as Kwame Nkrumah, Komla Gbedemah, Kojo Botsio, and Krobo Edusei.

The announcement of the couple's engagement in 1953 produced a firestorm of comment in Britain and around the world; and when Peggy Cripps and Joe Appiah were married at St John's Wood Church, north London, in June 1953, the occasion was front-page news in Britain, in Ghana, and many other countries and the event was one of the social events of the year. George Padmore, the West Indian Pan-Africanist was best man, deputizing for Kwame Nkrumah, who was too busy as the new leader of Government Business to attend himself. Hugh Gaitskell, Stafford's successor as Chancellor was there, as were Michael Foot, future leader of the Labour Party, Aneurin Bevan, Lady Quist, the wife of the Speaker of the Gold Coast Assembly, and Krishna Menon, India's ambassador to the United Nations. A Jamaican newspaper commented that there were "top-hatted and frock-coated British aristocrats... ex-Cabinet Ministers... as well as several Tory and Socialist Members of Parliament." The real attraction, however, was the kente cloth worn not only by the bridegroom but by many of his relatives and friends. Coverage in newspapers around the world ranged from the hostile to skeptical to admiring.

Peggy and Joe Appiah took their honeymoon in France and returned to England, where Joe was to finish his legal training at the Middle Temple. In May 1954 their first child, Kwame Anthony Appiah, was born (amid another flutter of newspaper publicity) and in November the young family arrived in the Gold Coast to begin their new life. During this period, while Joe was developing a legal career and beginning his life as a politician, Peggy focused most of her energy on her young family — Ama was born in 1955, Adwoa in 1960 and Abena in 1962 — and on working as a secretary and legal assistant in his law office and for his constituents, supporting her husband as she had supported her father. She learned to wear cloth, started attending funerals, and got to know her husband's family and his father's family as well. They built themselves a home in Mbrom (an area of Kumasi), where their neighbours were Victor Owusu, another senior NLM politician, John Brew, and, across the street, Joe Appiah's father, J.W.K. Appiah and his wife, Aunty Jane.

For more than 30 years, beginning in the late 1950s, Peggy Appiah's extensive library at Mbrom was made available to the children of the neighbourhood, who could come and read children's books, and, as they grew older, the novels and poetry she had collected. Among her most prized collections were many of the volumes of the Heinemann African Writers Series. Other frequent visitors to the house included the traders who brought her the gold weights they had acquired on their collecting trips through the villages and towns of Ghana. She also took an interest in the education and welfare of a number of young people, who became part of her extended family, among them Isobel Kusi-Obodom, whose father died in Nkrumah's prisons, and Dr Joe Appiah-Kusi of Seattle.

=== Politics ===
After Joe Appiah was elected to Parliament in 1956, prior to independence, Peggy Appiah continued to provide a secure home to which he could return from his political struggles, forget about politics, and rest in the bosom of his family. Peggy chose to join St. George's Church in Kumasi. She also worked with Dr. Alex Kyerematen for the development of the Cultural Center in Kumasi. She served on the Committee of the Children's Home, worked with the home for the Destitute in Bekwai, and in later years she became a patron of the Ghana National Association for the Blind. When her husband was imprisoned at the orders of Kwame Nkrumah in October 1961, she refused to leave the country and a deportation order was withdrawn when a front-page article appeared in the British press describing her situation.

Around this time her son Kwame was very ill. The following month, Queen Elizabeth II made her first visit to Ghana. While inspecting the Komfo Anokye Teaching Hospital in Kumasi, the Queen, the Duke of Edinburgh and President Nkrumah passed by the boy's bed. Since he had a picture of his parents displayed on his bedside table, the Duke of Edinburgh, who had visited Kumasi previously and had met Cripps, turned back, as he was leaving, to send his regards. President Nkrumah's reported anger at being embarrassed in this way -- the husband of a foreign head of state sending a greeting to the wife of a man Nkrumah had in political detention -- was reportedly one of the reasons that Kwame Appiah's doctor was deported.

The combination of her anxieties about her husband and her son put her under a great deal of strain, which was increased by the fact that she was pregnant at the time with her youngest child, Abena, who was extremely ill for much of her infancy. Nevertheless, she continued to maintain a stable home for her children and to work quietly for her husband's release, with the assistance of her mother, Lady Cripps, who was able to visit her son-in-law at Ussher Fort in 1962.

Lady Cripps returned to England with her sick grandson. Just before Christmas 1962, Joe was released from prison and allowed to return to legal practice. The anxieties of the final years of the Nkrumah regime were relieved in 1966, by the coup that ousted Nkrumah. In the years that followed, as her children were abroad at boarding schools and universities, and her husband was active once more in Ghanaian politics and as an ambassador for the nation, she stayed mostly in Kumasi, providing the base from which he could travel out into the world, secure in the knowledge that Peggy was taking care of things on the home front. She kept an eye on the properties he had inherited from his grand-uncle. Despite her family's extensive political involvements, Peggy herself was not particularly interested in party politics. While supporting her husband, her contributions were more through the wide range of social work she engaged in. Having learned Twi, the language of the Asante, she became interested in and knowledgeable about Akan art and folklore, as she acquired a major goldweight collection, began collecting and translating proverbs, and learned Ananse stories, many of them from her husband. For three decades, a visit to her house and her goldweight collection was one of the highlights of a visit to Ashanti for visitors interested in its art.

From the mid-1960s onwards, she began to publish a series of volumes of Ananse stories, retold for children, which became widely known in Africa, England and America and throughout the English-speaking world. Beginning with Ananse the Spider: Tales from an Ashanti Village in 1966, and followed by Tales of an Ashanti Father, she went on to publish the Children of Ananse in 1968, The Pineapple Child and Other Tales from Asante in 1969, Why There are So Many Roads in 1972, and Why the Hyena Does Not Care for Fish and Other Tales from the Ashanti Gold Weights in 1977. She also published a series of readers to help Ghanaian children learn English: The Lost Earring, Yao and the Python, Abena and the Python, Afua and the Mouse and Kofi and the Crow, as well as a series of novels for children and adults, including Gift of the Mmoatia and Ring of Gold, and two volumes of poetry. Some of her works are used as set texts in primary and secondary schools in West Africa. Perhaps, her most important publication, however, which was the result of nearly five decades of work, was Bu Me Bé: Proverbs of the Akan, a collection of more than 7,000 Twi proverbs that was launched in Accra in 2001.

In 1985, she and Joe Appiah travelled abroad together to visit their friend Kamuzu Banda, President of Malawi, whom they had known during his period of exile in Ghana, to celebrate the twenty-first anniversary of Malawi's independence. They travelled widely around the country, before going on to stay with their daughter Abena, who was then living in Zimbabwe, and Ama, who was working in Angola. Later in the decade, they made a visit to Ama in Norway, where Joe was diagnosed with the cancer that claimed his life in 1990.

=== Widowhood ===
In 1990, Peggy Appiah, now a widow, never considered leaving Ghana, telling anyone who asked her when she was "going home," that she was home already. She moved into a smaller house, which she built in a compound with a house for her daughter Abena, continued to work for her church, and went on studying Akan folklore. She visited her son and her daughters in the United States, Namibia and Nigeria, and was visited in turn by her children and sons-in-law, and her six grandsons, Kristian, Anthony and Kojo, children of Ama (Isobel) and Klaus Endresen; and Tomiwa, Lamide and Tobi, children of Adwoa and Olawale Edun. In the house next to her, with her daughter Abena, were her two grandchildren, Mimi and Mame Yaa.

=== Last years ===
In 2001, Peggy Appiah visited England for the last time to celebrate her 80th birthday with the surviving members of her own generation in her family and her children and grandchildren, along with many nephews and nieces and great-nephews and nieces.

In the final years of her life, as she became increasingly limited in her movements, she continued to be the center of a wide network of family and friends, and a caring household led by her housekeeper, Ma Rose. As she wrote at the end of her autobiography, published in 1995: "I thank God for all He has given me and the happiness He has brought me."

=== Death ===
Peggy Appiah died on 11 February 2006, aged 84, from undisclosed causes, at the Komfo Anokye Teaching Hospital in Kumasi. She was buried at Tafo cemetery in Kumasi, where she had bought a plot for herself beside her husband's grave.

== Honours ==
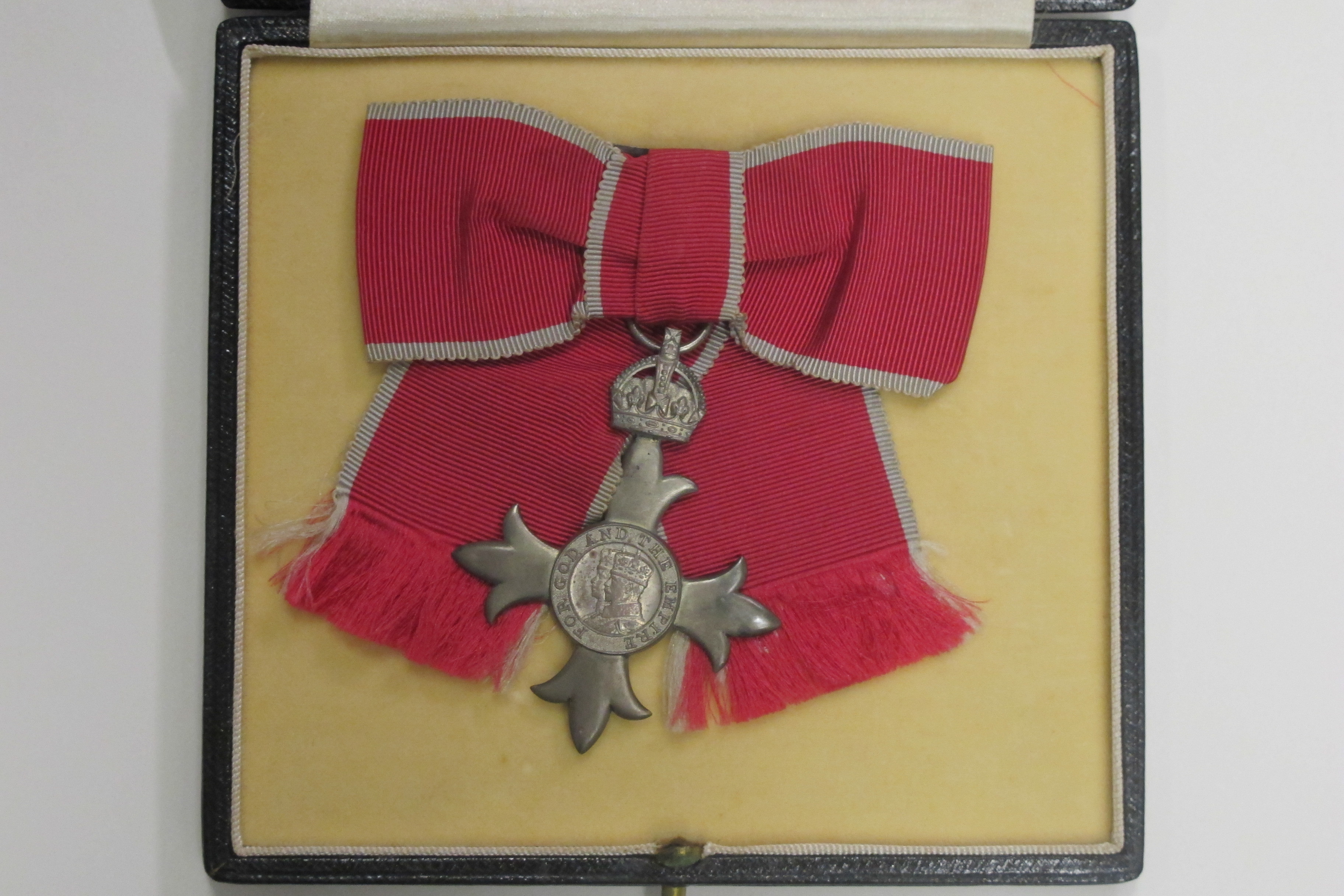
MBE insignia

In 1996, Queen Elizabeth II awarded Peggy Appiah the MBE "for services to UK/Ghanaian relations and community welfare".

She was awarded an honorary degree by the Kwame Nkrumah University of Science and Technology in 2005.

== Publications ==
- Bu Me Be: Akan Proverbs. Africa World Press, 2006.
- Busy body. Accra: Asempa, 1995.
- Rattletat. New Namibia Books, 1995.
- The Rubbish Heap. Accra: Asempa, 1995.
- Kyekyekulee, Grandmother's Tales. Accra: Quick Service Books, 1993.
- Kofi and the Crow. Accra: Quick Service Books, 1991.
- Afua and the Mouse. Accra: Quick Service Books, 1991.
- Abena and the Python. Accra: Quick Service Books, 1991.
- The Twins. Accra: Quick Service Books, 1991.
- Tales of an Ashanti Father. Boston: Beacon Press, 1989.
- A Dirge too Soon. Accra: Ghana Publishing, 1976.
- Ring of Gold. London: Deutsch, 1976.
- Why There are So Many Roads. Lagos: African University Press, 1972.
- Gift of the Mmoatia. Accra: Ghana Publishing, 1972.
- Why the Hyena Does Not Care for Fish and other tales from the Ashanti gold weights. London: Deutsch, 1971.
- A Smell of Onions. London: Longman, 1971.
- The Lost Earring. London: Evans, 1971.
- Yao and the Python. London: Evans, 1971.
- The Pineapple Child and other tales from Ashanti. London: Evans, 1969.
- The Children of Ananse. London: Evans, 1968.
- Ananse the Spider: Tales from an Ashanti village. New York: Pantheon, 1966.

== In popular culture ==
It has been suggested that the experiences of the Appiahs, as well as the somewhat contemporary case of the Lloyd's underwriter Ruth Williams' marriage to the African aristocrat Kgosi Seretse Khama, influenced the writing of the Oscar-winning feature film, Guess Who's Coming to Dinner (1967).

== Sources ==
- Brozan, Nadine. "Peggy Appiah, 84, Author Who Bridged Two Cultures, Dies." New York Times, "International," 16 February 2006.
- Tucker, Nicholas. "Peggy Appiah: Daughter of Stafford Cripps who dedicated herself to creating a children's literature for Ghana" (obituary). The Independent, 17 February 2006.
- Addai-Sebo, Akyaaba. "The Legacy Of Peggy Appiah—A Tribute." The New Times Online. Sunday, 9 April 2006.
- Akosah, Kwabena Sarpong. "Tribute for Peggy Appiah". Homepage Ghana, 19 February 2006.
