= Kwame Anthony Appiah =

English-American philosopher (born 1954)

Kwame Anthony Appiah FRSL HonFRS
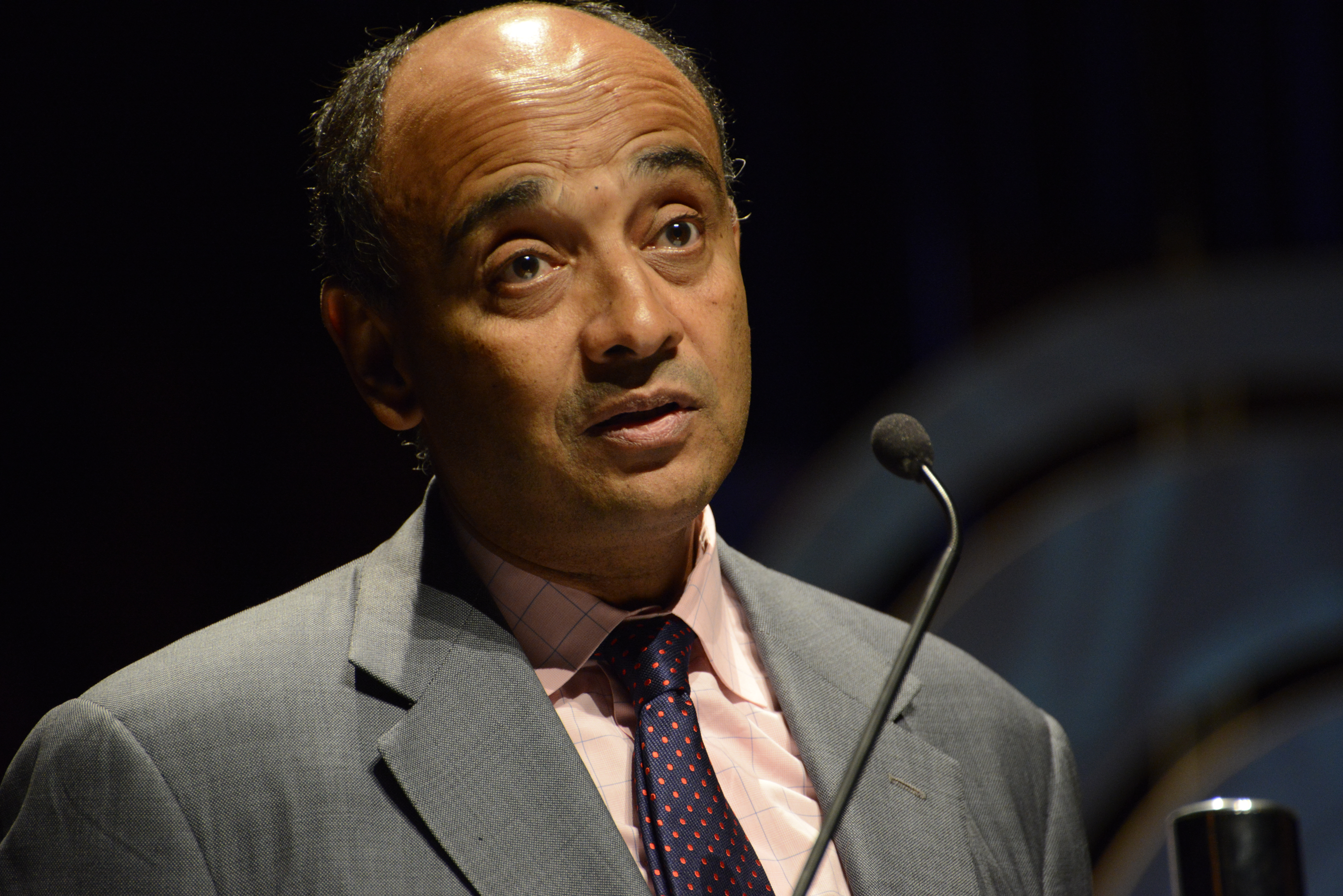
- Appiah at Fronteiras do Pensamento Porto Alegre 2013
- Born: Kwame Akroma-Ampim Kusi Anthony Appiah; 8 May 1954 (age 72); London, England
- Citizenship: United States (since 1997)
- Occupations: Philosopher and writer
- Spouse: Henry Finder
- Parents: Joe Appiah (father); Peggy Cripps Appiah (mother)
- Family: Cripps–Appiah–Edun

Education
- Education: Bryanston School; Clare College, Cambridge
- Thesis: Conditions for Conditionals (1981)
- Doctoral advisor: Hugh Mellor

Philosophical work
- Era: Contemporary philosophy
- Region: Western philosophy; African philosophy
- School: Cosmopolitanism
- Institutions: New York University; Princeton University; Fordham University; Harvard University; Yale University; Cornell University; University of Ghana
- Main interests: Probabilistic semantics, political theory, moral theory, intellectual history, race and identity theory
- Notable works: Experiments in Ethics (2008)
- Website: www.appiah.net

Kwame Akroma-Ampim Kusi Anthony Appiah (/ˈæpiɑː/ AP-ee-ah; born 8 May 1954) is a Ghanaian-English-American philosopher and writer who has written about political philosophy, ethics, the philosophy of language and mind, and African intellectual history. Appiah is Professor of Philosophy and Law at New York University, where he joined the faculty in 2014, and has been a Silver Professor since 2025. He was previously the Laurance S. Rockefeller University Professor of Philosophy at Princeton University. Appiah was elected President of the American Academy of Arts and Letters in January 2022.

== Early life and education ==
Appiah was born in London, England, to Peggy Cripps Appiah (née Cripps), an English art historian and writer, and Joe Appiah, a lawyer, diplomat, and politician from Ashanti Region, Ghana. For two years (1970–1972), Joe Appiah was the leader of a new opposition party that was made by the country's three opposing parties. Simultaneously, he was the president of the Ghana Bar Association. Between 1977 and 1978, he was Ghana's representative at the United Nations.

Kwame Anthony Appiah was raised in Kumasi, Ghana, and educated at Bryanston School and Clare College, Cambridge, where he earned his BA (first-class) and PhD degrees in philosophy. He has three sisters: Isobel, Adwoa and Abena. As a child, he spent a good deal of time in England, staying with his grandmother Dame Isobel Cripps, widow of the English statesman Sir Stafford Cripps.

== Ancestry ==
Appiah's mother's family has a long political tradition: Sir Stafford was a nephew of Beatrice Webb and was Labour Chancellor of the Exchequer (1947–1950) under Clement Attlee; his father, Charles Cripps, was Labour Leader of the House of Lords (1929–31), as Lord Parmoor in Ramsay MacDonald's government; Parmoor had been a Conservative MP before defecting to Labour. Through his grandmother Isobel Cripps, Appiah is a descendant of the British pharmacist James Crossley Eno.

Through Appiah's father, a Nana of the Ashanti people, he is a direct descendant of Osei Tutu, the warrior emperor of pre-colonial Ghana, whose reigning successor, the Asantehene, is a distant relative of the Appiah family. Also among his African ancestors is the Ashanti nobleman Nana Akroma-Ampim I of Nyaduom, a warrior after whom Appiah was named.

== Personal life ==
He lives with his husband, Henry Finder, an editorial director of The New Yorker, in an apartment in Manhattan, and a home in Pennington, New Jersey with a small sheep farm.

Appiah became a naturalized U.S. citizen in 1997. The actor Adetomiwa Edun is one of his nephews, the son of his sister Amy Appiah.

== Career ==
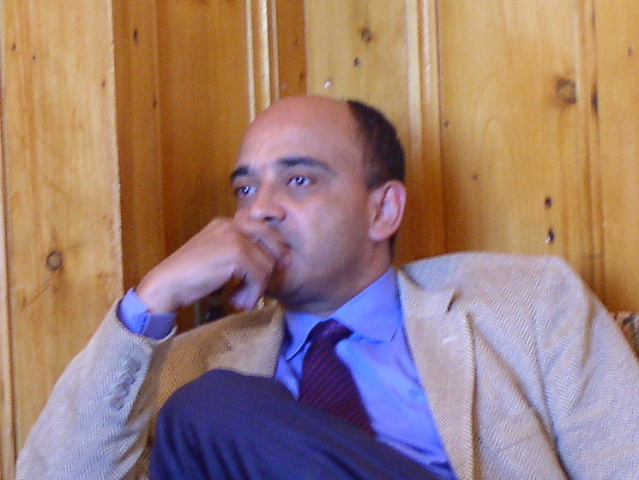
Appiah during a lecture and visit to Knox College in 2006.

Appiah taught philosophy and African-American studies at the University of Ghana, Cornell, Yale, Harvard, and Princeton Universities from 1981 to 1988. Until 2014, he was the Laurance S. Rockefeller University Professor of Philosophy at Princeton (with a cross-appointment at the University Center for Human Values) and also was the Bacon-Kilkenny Professor of Law at Fordham University in the fall of 2008. Appiah also served on the board of PEN American Center and was on a panel of judges for the PEN/Newman's Own First Amendment Award. He has lectured at many other institutions in the US, Germany, Ghana and South Africa, and Paris. Until the fall of 2009, he served as a trustee of Ashesi University College in Accra, Ghana. Since 2014, he has been a professor of philosophy and law at NYU.

His Cambridge dissertation explored the foundations of probabilistic semantics. In 1992, Appiah published In My Father's House, which won the Herskovitz Prize for African Studies in English. Among his later books are Colour Conscious (with Amy Gutmann), The Ethics of Identity (2005), and Cosmopolitanism: Ethics in a World of Strangers (2006). He has been a close collaborator with Henry Louis Gates Jr., with whom he edited Africana: The Encyclopedia of the African and African-American Experience. Appiah was elected a Fellow of the American Academy of Arts and Sciences in 1995.

In 2008, Appiah published Experiments in Ethics, in which he reviews the relevance of empirical research to ethical theory. In the same year, he was recognised for his contributions to racial, ethnic, and religious relations when Brandeis University awarded him the first Joseph B. and Toby Gittler Prize.

As well as his academic work, Appiah has also published several works of fiction. His first novel, Avenging Angel, set at the University of Cambridge, involved a murder among the Cambridge Apostles; Sir Patrick Scott is the detective in the novel. Appiah's second and third novels are Nobody Likes Letitia and Another Death in Venice.

Appiah has been nominated for, or received, several honours. He was the 2009 finalist in the arts and humanities for the Eugene R. Gannon Award for the Continued Pursuit of Human Advancement. In 2010, he was named by Foreign Policy magazine on its list of top global thinkers. On 13 February 2012, Appiah was awarded the National Humanities Medal at a ceremony at the White House.

Appiah currently chairs the jury for the Berggruen Prize, and serves on the Berggruen Institute's Philosophy & Culture Center's Academic Board. He was elected as President of the American Academy of Arts and Letters in January 2022.

=== Ideas ===
Appiah's early philosophical work dealt with probabilistic semantics and theories of meaning, but his more recent books have tackled philosophical problems of race and racism, identity, and moral theory. His current work tackles three major areas: 1. the philosophical foundations of liberalism; 2. the questioning of methods in arriving at knowledge about values; and 3. the connections between theory and practice in moral life, all of which concepts can also be found in his book Cosmopolitanism: Ethics in a World of Strangers.

On postmodern culture, Appiah writes, "Postmodern culture is the culture in which all postmodernisms operate, sometimes in synergy, sometimes in competition; and because contemporary culture is, in a certain sense to which I shall return, transnational, postmodern culture is global – though that emphatically does not mean that it is the culture of every person in the world."

==== Cosmopolitanism ====
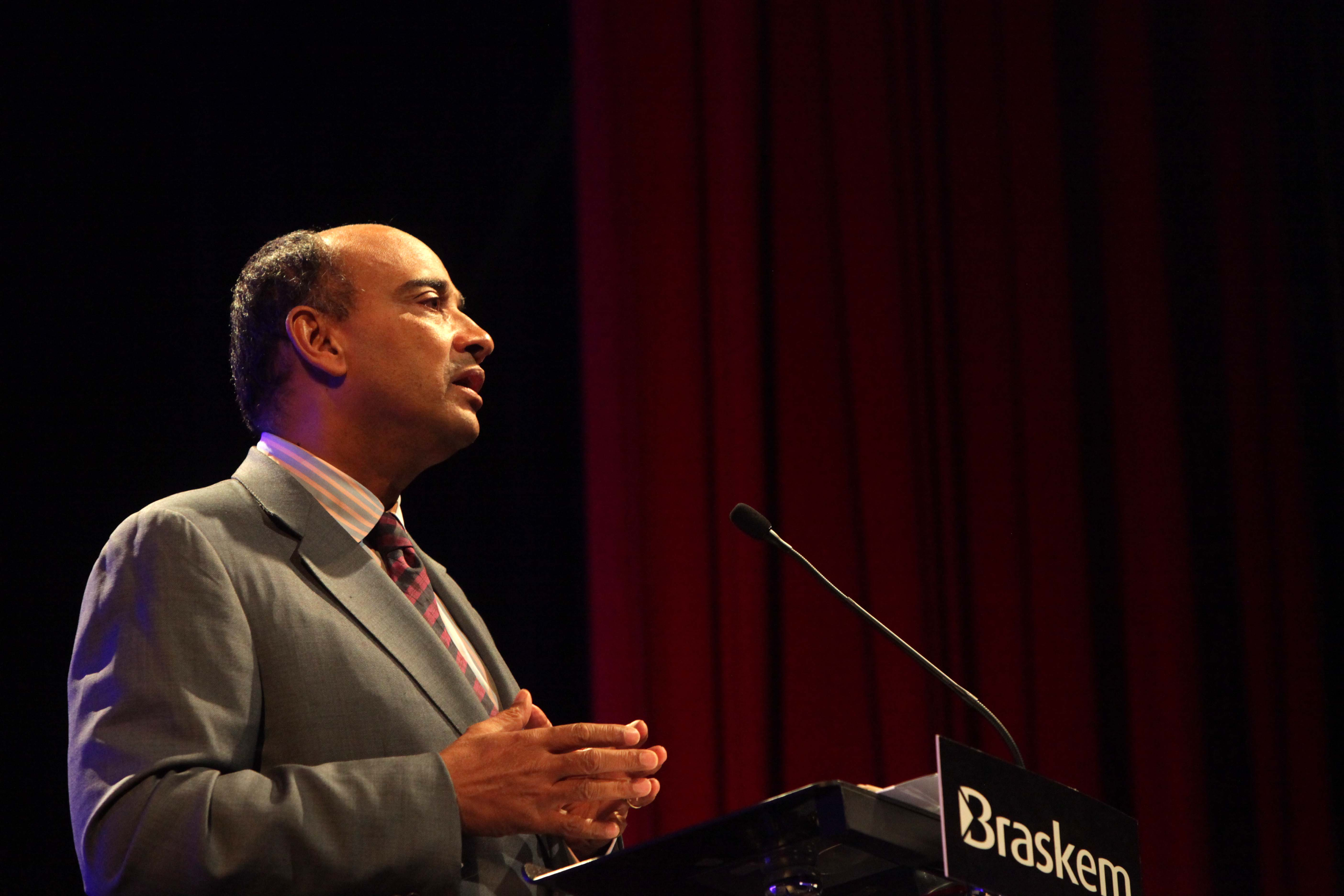
Appiah at Fronteiras do Pensamento São Paulo.

Appiah has been influenced by the cosmopolitan philosophical tradition, which stretches from Greek thinkers such as Diogenes to African American thinkers like W. E. B. Du Bois, among others. In his article "Education for Global Citizenship", Appiah outlines his conception of cosmopolitanism. He therein defines cosmopolitanism as "universality plus difference". Building from this definition, he asserts that the first takes precedence over the latter, that is: different cultures are respected "not because cultures matter in themselves, but because people matter, and culture matters to people." Accordingly, cultural differences are to be respected in so far as they are not harmful to people and in no way conflict with our universal concern for every human's life and well-being.

In his book Cosmopolitanism: Ethics in a World of Strangers (2006), Appiah introduces two ideas that "intertwine in the notion of cosmopolitanism" (Emerging, 69). The first is the idea that we have obligations to others that are bigger than just sharing citizenship. The second idea is that we should never take for granted the value of life and become informed of the practices and beliefs of others. Kwame Appiah frequents university campuses to speak to students. One request he makes is, "See one movie with subtitles a month."

In Lies that Bind (2018), Appiah attempts to deconstruct identities of creed, colour, country, and class.

==== Criticism of Afrocentric world view ====
Appiah has been a critic of contemporary theories of Afrocentrism. In his 1997 essay "Europe Upside Down: Fallacies of the New Afrocentrism", he argues that current Afrocentricism is striking for "how thoroughly at home it is in the frameworks of nineteenth century European thought", particularly as a mirror image to Eurocentric constructions of race and a preoccupation with the ancient world. Appiah also finds an irony in the conception that if the source of the West lies in ancient Egypt via Greece, then "its legacy of ethnocentrism is presumably one of our moral liabilities."

== In popular culture ==
- In 2007, Appiah was a contributing scholar in the PBS-broadcast documentary Prince Among Slaves, produced by Unity Productions Foundation.
- In 2007, he also appeared in the TV documentary series Racism: A History as an on-screen contributor.
- Appiah appeared alongside a number of contemporary philosophers in Astra Taylor's 2008 film Examined Life, discussing his views on cosmopolitanism.
- In 2009, he was an on-screen contributor to the movie Herskovits: At the Heart of Blackness.
- In 2015, he became one of three contributors to the New York Times Magazine column "The Ethicist", before assuming sole authorship of the column later that year.
- Appiah delivered the BBC's Reith Lectures in late 2016 on the theme of Mistaken Identities.
- In late 2016, Appiah contended that Western civilization did not exist, and argued that many ostensibly unique Western attributes and values were instead shared among many "non-western" cultures and/or eras.
- In 2018, Appiah appeared in the episode "Can We Live Forever?" of the documentary series Explained.

== Awards and honours ==
- Anisfield-Wolf Book Award for In My Father's House, April 1993
- Honorable Mention, James Russell Lowell Prize of the Modern Language Association for In My Father's House, December 1993
- 1993 Herskovits Award of the African Studies Association "for the best work published in English on Africa", for In My Father's House, December 1993
- Annual Book Award, 1996, North American Society for Social Philosophy, "for the book making the most significant contribution to social philosophy" for Color Conscious, May 1997
- Ralph J. Bunche Award, American Political Science Association, "for the best scholarly work in political science which explores the phenomenon of ethnic and cultural pluralism" for Color Conscious, July 1997
- Outstanding Book on the subject of human rights in North America, Gustavus Myers Center for the Study of Human Rights in North America, for Color Conscious, 10 December 1997
- Elected member of the American Philosophical Society
- Honorable Mention, Gustavus Myers Outstanding Book Award, Gustavus Myers Center for the Study of Bigotry and Human Rights for The Ethics of Identity, 9 December 2005
- Editors' Choice New York Times Book Review, The Ethics of Identity, 26 June 2005.
- Amazon.com Best Books of 2005, Top 10 Editors' Picks: Nonfiction, The Ethics of Identity, December 2005
- Arthur Ross Book Award of the Council on Foreign Relations, Cosmopolitanism, May 2007
- Finalist for Estoril Global Ethics Book Prize, for Cosmopolitanism (2009)
- A Times Literary Supplement's Book of the Year 2010 for The Honor Code
- One of the New York Times Book Review's 100 Notable Books of 2010 for The Honor Code
- New Jersey Council for the Humanities Book Award 2011 for The Honor Code
- Global Thought Leaders Index 2015, No. 95, The World Post
- In August 2016, Appiah was enstooled as the Nkosuahene of Nyaduom, a Ghanaian chief of the Ashanti people, in Nyaduom - his family's ancestral chiefdom in Ghana.
- In 2017, Appiah was elected as a Fellow of the Royal Society of Literature (FRSL)
- In June 2017, Appiah was named by the Carnegie Corporation of New York as one of its 2017 "Great Immigrants"
- In December 2021, Appiah received the prestigious Gold Medal from The National Institute of Social Sciences.
- In June 2022, Professor Appiah received an Honorary Degree from Cambridge University. This is a degree that is bestowed upon people who have made outstanding achievements in their respective fields.
- 2024 John W. Kluge Prize for Achievement in the Study of Humanity, awarded by the Library of Congress. It recognizes "work in disciplines not covered by the Nobel Prizes".

== Bibliography ==
=== Books ===
- Assertion and Conditionals. Cambridge Studies in Philosophy Series. Cambridge Cambridgeshire New York: Cambridge University Press. 1985. ISBN 9780521304115.
- For Truth in Semantics. Philosophical Theory Series. Oxford, UK; New York, NY, USA: B. Blackwell. 1986. ISBN 9780631145967.
- Necessary Questions: An Introduction to Philosophy. Englewood Cliffs, New Jersey: Prentice-Hall. 1989. ISBN 9780136113287.
- In My Father's House: Africa in the Philosophy of Culture. London / New York: Methuen / Oxford University Press. 1992. ISBN 9780195068511.
- With Gutmann, Amy (1996). Color Conscious: The Political Morality of Race. Princeton, New Jersey: Princeton University Press. ISBN 9780691026619.
- With Appiah, Peggy; Agyeman-Duah, Ivor (2007) [2002]. Bu me b?: Proverbs of the Akans (2nd ed.). Oxfordshire, UK: Ayebia Clarke. ISBN 9780955507922.
- Kosmopolitischer Patriotismus (in German). Frankfurt am Main: Suhrkamp. 2001. ISBN 9783518122303.
- With Gates Jr., Henry Louis, ed. (2003). Africana: The Encyclopedia of the African and African American Experience: the concise desk reference. Philadelphia: Running Press. ISBN 9780762416424.
- Thinking It Through: An Introduction to Contemporary Philosophy. Oxford New York: Oxford University Press. 2003. ISBN 9780195134582.
- The Ethics of Identity. Princeton, New Jersey: Princeton University Press. 2005. ISBN 9780691130286. Archived from the original on 18 October 2006.

Translated as: La Ética de la identidad (in Spanish). Buenos Aires, Madrid: Katz Editores. 2007. ISBN 9788493543242.

- Cosmopolitanism: Ethics in a World of Strangers. New York: W.W. Norton & Co. 2006. ISBN 9780141027814.

Translated as: Cosmopolitismo: la ética en un mundo de extraños (in Spanish). Buenos Aires, Madrid: Katz Editores. 2007. ISBN 9788496859081.

- The Politics of Culture, the Politics of Identity. Toronto, Canada: ICC at the Royal Ontario Museum. 2008. ISBN 9780888544643.
- Experiments in Ethics. Cambridge, Massachusetts: Harvard University Press. 2008. ISBN 9780674034570.

Translated as: Experimentos de ética (in Spanish). Buenos Aires, Madrid: Katz Editores. 2010. ISBN 9788492946112.

- Mi cosmopolitismo (in Spanish). Buenos Aires, Madrid: Katz Editores. 2008. ISBN 9788496859371. (En coedición con el Centro de Cultura Contemporánea de Barcelona.)
- The Honor Code: How Moral Revolutions Happen. New York: W. W. Norton. 2010. ISBN 9780393071627.
- Lines of Descent: W.E.B. Du Bois and the Emergence of Identity. Cambridge, Massachusetts: Harvard University Press. 2014. ISBN 9780674419346.
- Kapai, Puja, ed. (2015). A Decent Respect: Honor in the Life of People and of Nations, Hochelaga Lectures 2015. Faculty of Law: University of Hong Kong. Original lecture.
- As If: Idealization and Ideals. Based on The 2013 Paul Carus Lectures. Cambridge: Harvard University Press, 2017.
- The Lies That Bind: Rethinking Identity—Creed, Country, Color, Class, Culture. London: Profile Books, 2018 and New York: Liveright Publishing, Profile Books, 2018 ISBN 978-1781259238, 978-1631493836
- Captive Gods: Religion and the Rise of Social Science. Terry Lectures Series. New Haven, CT / London: Yale University Press. 2025. ISBN 9780300233063.

Novels

- Avenging Angel. New York: St. Martin's Press. 1991. ISBN 9780312058173.
- Nobody Likes Letitia. London: Constable. 1994. ISBN 9780094733008.
- Another Death in Venice. London: Constable. 1995. ISBN 9780094744301.

=== Book chapters ===
- Appiah, Anthony (1984), "Strictures on structures: the prospects for a structuralist poetics of African fiction", in Gates, Jr., Henry Louis (ed.), Black literature and literary theory, New York: Methuen, pp. 127–150, ISBN 9780415903349.
- Appiah, Anthony (1985), "Soyinka and the philosophy of culture", in Bodunrin, P.O. (ed.), Philosophy in Africa: trends and perspectives, Ile-Ife, Nigeria: University of Ife Press, pp. 250–263, ISBN 9789781360725.
- Appiah, Anthony (1987), "A long way from home: Richard Wright in the Gold Coast", in Bloom, Harold (ed.), Richard Wright, Modern Critical views Series, New York: Chelsea House Publishers, pp. 173–190, ISBN 9780877546399.
- Appiah, Anthony (1990), "Race", in Lentricchia, Frank; McLaughlin, Tom (eds.), Critical terms for literary study, Chicago: University of Chicago Press, pp. 274–287, ISBN 9780226472027.
- Appiah, Anthony (1990), "Racisms", in Goldberg, David (ed.), Anatomy of racism, Minneapolis: University of Minnesota Press, pp. 3–17, ISBN 9780816618040.
- Appiah, Anthony (1991), "Tolerable falsehoods: agency and the interests of theory", in Johnson, Barbara; Arac, Jonathan (eds.), Consequences of theory, Baltimore: Johns Hopkins University Press, pp. 63–90, ISBN 9780801840456.
- Appiah, Anthony (1992), "Inventing an African practice in philosophy: epistemological issues", in Mudimbe, Valentin-Yves (ed.), The surreptitious speech: Présence Africaine and the politics of otherness, 1947–1987, Chicago: University of Chicago Press, pp. 227–237, ISBN 9780226545073.
- Appiah, Kwame Anthony (1992), "Introduction", in Achebe, Chinua (ed.), Things fall apart, Everyman's Library Series, No. 135, New York: Knopf Distributed by Random House, pp. ix–xvii, ISBN 9780679446231.
- Appiah, Anthony (1992), "African identities", in Amselle, Jean-Loup; Appiah, Anthony; Bagayogo, Shaka; Chrétien, Jean-Pierre; Dakhlia, Jocelyne; Gellner, Ernest; LaRue, Richard; Mudimbe, Valentin-Yves; Topolski, Jerzy (eds.), Constructions identitaires: questionnements théoriques et études de cas, Québec: CÉLAT, Université Laval, ISBN 9782920576445. Fernande Saint-Martin sous la direction de Bogumil Jewsiewicki et Jocelyn Létourneau, Actes du Célat No. 6, Mai 1992.
- Appiah, Kwame Anthony; Mudimbe, V. Y. (1993), "The impact of African studies on philosophy", in Bates, Robert H.; Mudimbe, V. Y.; O'Barr, Jean (eds.), Africa and the disciplines: the contributions of research in Africa to the social sciences and humanities, Chicago: University of Chicago Press, pp. 113–138, ISBN 9780226039015.
- Appiah, K. Anthony (1994), "Identity, authenticity, survival: multicultural societies and social reproduction", in Taylor, Charles; Gutmann, Amy (eds.), Multiculturalism: examining the politics of recognition, Princeton, New Jersey: Princeton University Press, pp. 149–164, ISBN 9780691037790.
- Appiah, Kwame Anthony (1995), "Philosophy and necessary questions", in Kwame, Safro (ed.), Readings in African philosophy: an Akan collection, Lanham: University Press of America, pp. 1–22, ISBN 9780819199119.
- Appiah, K. Anthony (1996), "Race, culture, identity: misunderstood connections", in Peterson, Grethe B. (ed.), The Tanner lectures on human values XVII, Salt Lake City: University of Utah Press, pp. 51–136, ISBN 9780585197708. Pdf.
- Appiah, K. Anthony (1997), "African-American philosophy?", in Pittman, John (ed.), African-American perspectives and philosophical traditions, New York: Routledge, pp. 11–34, ISBN 9780415916400.
- Appiah, Kwame Anthony (1997), "Europe upside down: fallacies of the new Afrocentrism", in Grinker, Roy Richard; Steiner, Christopher B. (eds.), Perspectives on Africa: a reader in culture, history, and representation, Cambridge, Massachusetts: Blackwell, pp. 728–731, ISBN 9781557866868.
- Appiah, Kwame Anthony (1997), "Is the 'post-' in 'postcolonial' the 'post-' in 'postmodern'?", in McClintock, Anne; Mufti, Aamir; Shohat, Ella (eds.), Dangerous liaisons: gender, nation, and postcolonial perspectives, Minnesota, Minneapolis: University of Minnesota Press, pp. 420–444, ISBN 9780816626496.
- Appiah, Kwame Anthony (1996), "Identity: political not cultural", in Garber, Marjorie; Walkowitz, Rebecca L.; Franklin, Paul B. (eds.), Field work: sites in literary and cultural studies, New York: Routledge, pp. 34–40, ISBN 9780415914550.
- Appiah, Kwame Anthony (1999), "Yambo Ouolouguem and the meaning of postcoloniality", in Wise, Christopher (ed.), Yambo Ouologuem: postcolonial writer, Islamic militant, Boulder, Colorado: Lynne Rienner Publishers, pp. 55–63, ISBN 9780894108617.
- Appiah, Kwame Anthony (2000), "Aufklärung und dialogue der kulturen", in Krull, Wilhelm (ed.), Zukunftsstreit (in German), Weilerwist: Velbrück Wissenschaft, pp. 305–328, ISBN 9783934730175.
- Appiah, K. Anthony (2001), "Grounding human rights", in Gutmann, Amy (ed.), Michael Ignatieff: Human rights as politics and idolatry, The University Center for Human Values Series, Princeton, New Jersey: Princeton University Press, pp. 101–116, ISBN 9780691114743.
- Appiah, K. Anthony (2001), "Stereotypes and the shaping of identity", in Post, Robert C. (ed.), Prejudicial appearances: the logic of American antidiscrimination law, Durham: Duke University Press, pp. 55–71, ISBN 9780822327134.
- Appiah, Kwame Anthony (2002), "The State and the shaping of identity", in Peterson, Grethe B. (ed.), The Tanner lectures on human values XXIII, Salt Lake City: University of Utah Press, pp. 235–297, ISBN 9780874807189 Pdf.
- Appiah, Kwame Anthony (2009), "Sen's identities", in Kanbur, Ravi; Basu, Kaushik (eds.), Arguments for a better world: essays in honor of Amartya Sen | Volume I: Ethics, welfare, and measurement, Oxford New York: Oxford University Press, pp. 475–488, ISBN 9780199239115.

=== Journal articles ===
- Appiah, Kwame Anthony (Winter 1981). "Structuralist criticism and African fiction: an analytic critique". Black American Literature Forum. 15 (4): 165–174. doi:10.2307/2904328. JSTOR 2904328. S2CID 149470070.
- — (October 1984). "An argument against anti-realist semantics". Mind. 93 (372): 559–565. doi:10.1093/mind/XCIII.372.559. JSTOR 2254262.
- — (November 1984). "Generalising the probabilistic semantics of conditionals". Journal of Philosophical Logic. 13 (4): 351–372. doi:10.1007/BF00247710. JSTOR 30226312. S2CID 21407826.
- — (1 July 1985). "Verificationism and the manifestations of meaning". Aristotelian Society, Supplementary Volume. 59 (1): 17–31. doi:10.1093/aristoteliansupp/59.1.17.
- — (Autumn 1985). "The uncompleted argument: Du Bois and the illusion of race". Critical Inquiry. 12 (1): 21–37. doi:10.1086/448319. JSTOR 1343460. S2CID 162202031.
- — (April 1986). "The importance of triviality". The Philosophical Review. 95 (2): 209–231. doi:10.2307/2185590. JSTOR 2185590.
- — (Spring 1986). "Review: Deconstruction and the philosophy of language Reviewed Work: The Deconstructive Turn: Essays in the Rhetoric of Philosophy by Christopher Norris". Diacritics. 16 (1): 48–64. doi:10.2307/464650. JSTOR 464650.
- — (Spring–Summer 1986). "Review: Are we ethnic? The theory and practice of American pluralism. Reviewed work: Beyond Ethnicity: Consent and Descent in American Culture by Werner Sollors". Black American Literature Forum. 20 (1–2): 209–224. doi:10.2307/2904561. JSTOR 2904561.
- — (Winter–Spring 1987). "Racism and moral pollution". The Philosophical Forum. 18 (2–3): 185–202. doi:10.1111/(ISSN)1467-9191.
- — (Spring 1988). "Out of Africa: topologies of nativism". Yale Journal of Criticism. 2 (1): 153–178.
- — (Autumn 1990). "Alexander Crummell and the invention of Africa". The Massachusetts Review. 31 (3): 385–406. JSTOR 25090195. Publisher's website.
- — (October 1990). "But would that still be me?" Notes on gender, "race," ethnicity, as sources of "identity" (PDF). The Journal of Philosophy. 87 (10): 493–499. doi:10.5840/jphil1990871026. JSTOR 2026866.
- — (Spring 1993). "African-American Philosophy?". The Philosophical Forum. 24 (1–3): 1–24. doi:10.1111/(ISSN)1467-9191.
- — (Spring 1998). "Race, pluralism, and Afrocentricity". The Journal of Blacks in Higher Education. 19 (19): 116–118. doi:10.2307/2998938. JSTOR 2998938.
- — (2004). "Comprendre les réparations: une réflexion préliminaire" [Understanding reparation: a preliminary reflection]. Cahiers d'Études Africaines (in French and English). 44 (173–174): 25–40. doi:10.4000/etudesafricaines.4518. JSTOR 4393367.
- — (April 2008). "Chapter 6: Education for global citizenship". Yearbook of the National Society for the Study of Education. 107 (1): 83–99. doi:10.1111/j.1744-7984.2008.00133.x.
- — (21 September 2010). "Convincing other cultures to change". Big Think. Archived from the original on 12 December 2013.
- Appiah, Kwame Anthony & Lionel Barber (Winter 2019). "The unity in disunity : looking at the world of globalization". Carnegie Conversation. Carnegie Reporter. 11 (1). Moderated by Scott Malcomson: 8–15.
- —"The Key to All Mythologies" (review of Emmanuelle Loyer, Lévi-Strauss: A Biography, translated from the French by Ninon Vinsonneau and Jonathan Magidoff, Polity, 2019, 744 pp.; and Maurice Godelier, Claude Lévi-Strauss: A Critical Study of His Thought, translated from the French by Nora Scott, Verso, 2019, 540 pp.), The New York Review of Books, vol. LXVII, no. 2 (13 February 2020), pp. 18–20. Appiah concludes his review (p. 20): "Lévi-Strauss... was... an inspired interpreter, a brilliant reader.... When the landmarks of science succeed in advancing their subject, they need no longer be consulted: physicists don't study Newton; chemists don't pore over Lavoisier.... If some part of Lévi-Strauss's scholarly oeuvre survives, it will be because his scientific aspirations have not."

== See also ==
- Black British nobility, Appiah's class in Britain
- African philosophy
- Africana philosophy
