= Joe Appiah =

Ghanaian lawyer and politician (1918–1990)

The Honourable Nana Joe Appiah MP

Member of the Ghana Parliament for Atwima-Amansie
- In office 1957–1961
- Preceded by: Isaac Joseph Adomako-Mensah
- Succeeded by: Isaac Joseph Adomako-Mensah

Personal details
- Born: Joseph Emmanuel Appiah; 16 November 1918 Kumasi, Ghana
- Died: 8 July 1990 (aged 71) Accra, Ghana
- Resting place: Tafo Cemetery, Kumasi
- Party: National Liberation Movement
- Other political affiliations: United Party; Justice Party
- Spouse: Peggy Cripps
- Children: Kwame Anthony Appiah, Isobel Ama, Adwoa, Abena
- Relatives: Jackie Appiah (niece)
- Profession: Politician, Lawyer and Diplomat

Joseph Emmanuel Appiah, MP (/ˈæpiɑː/ AP-ee-ah; 16 November 1918 – 8 July 1990) was a Ghanaian lawyer, politician and statesman.

== Biography ==
He was born in Kumasi, Gold Coast (present-day Ghana), on 26 November 1918, to Nana James W.K. Appiah and Nana Adwoa Akyaa, members of the Ashanti imperial aristocracy. His father was a schoolmaster, Methodist leader, traditional nobleman and, finally, Chief Secretary of Asanteman – a position that gave him considerable influence in Ashanti affairs. Appiah was educated at Wesley College, Mfantsipim, and the Middle Temple.

During his time in the United Kingdom, he was closely involved with the West African Students' Union (WASU), eventually becoming its president. He came, through residence in London and involvement with WASU, to know many of the main players in the fight against imperial rule in Ghana and elsewhere in Africa. Not least among these was Kwame Nkrumah, to whom he became very close. In 1945, Joe Appiah went to the Fifth Pan-African Congress in Manchester, representing the West African Students' Union which was attended by many other future Ghanaian politicians.

Nkrumah was Appiah's first choice for best man at his wedding to Peggy Cripps in 1953 ("but the job went to arguably the more influential figure of George Padmore, a Trinidadian who was political mentor to African nationalist leaders, including Nkrumah and Jomo Kenyatta"). Their first child, son Kwame, was born in London in 1954, followed by daughters Ama (Isobel) (born 1955), Adwoa (born 1960) and Abena (born 1962).

The Appiah family returned to Ghana in late 1954. Soon after, Joe Appiah's close friendship with Kwame Nkrumah was ruined, as he was more popular with the people than Nkrumah. Appiah was later imprisoned for many years by Nkrumah to prevent him from entering national politics. Appiah joined the National Liberation Movement (NLM) party and won the Atwima-Amansie seat in 1957. The NLM was later to merge with other opposition parties to form the United Party. After the General Afrifa-led coup that overthrew Nkrumah in 1966, he was asked to explain the new regime's motives to Ghana's friends and neighbours. Appiah was intermittently involved in public life as a diplomat and a government minister from then on until his retirement in 1978.

He returned to Kumasi, where he continued to fulfil his duties as a tribal elder. Following the death of his grand-uncle Yao Antony, he had become the head of their branch of the nobility of the Ashanti people. Prior to his own death, he served as the kingmaker and titular overlord of Nyaduom, a town that was founded centuries before by his ancestor Nana Akroma-Ampim I.

His autobiography Joe Appiah: The Autobiography of an African Patriot was published in 1990. Kwame Anthony Appiah's In My Father's House: Africa in the Philosophy of Culture was inspired by his father's easy cosmopolitanism.

His relationship with Peggy Cripps is said to be a major influence behind the film Guess Who's Coming to Dinner, which won two Academy Awards and two British Academy Film Awards.

Joe Appiah died in Accra on 8 July 1990, after an illness, and was buried at Tafo cemetery at Kumasi in the Ashanti Region. His widow would buy and occupy the adjacent plot after her death in 2006. In 2008, Appiah's tomb was vandalised by unknown persons.

== Books ==
- Appiah, Joe (1990). Autobiography of an African Patriot. New York: Greenwood Press. p. 400. ISBN 978-0-275-93672-3. ASIN 0275936724.
- Appiah, Kwame Anthony (1993). In My Father's House: Africa in the Philosophy of Culture. Oxford University Press. p. 256. ISBN 978-0-19-506852-8. ASIN 0195068521.
