= Harold William Swithinbank =

British veterinarian

Commander Harold William Swithinbank JP DL FRS FRSE FRGS FSA

Personal details
- Born: 7 March 1858 Newcastle upon Tyne, England
- Died: 9 February 1928 (aged 69) At sea
- Occupation: Veterinary surgeon

Harold William Swithinbank (7 March 1858 – 9 February 1928) was a British veterinary surgeon who served in both the army and navy. He was Governor of the Royal Agricultural Society and Vice President of the Royal Veterinary College.

== Life ==
Swithinbank was born in Newcastle-upon-Tyne, Northumberland on 7 March 1858, the second son of George Edwin Swithinbank FSA LLD (b. 1833) and his wife Constantia Anne Briggs.

He trained as a veterinarian but had a largely military career beginning as a Lieutenant in the 11th Hussars, then as a captain in the Middlesex Yeomanry (Cavalry section).

Swithinbank served as Justice of the Peace for Buckinghamshire and in 1891 was High Sheriff. He lived most of his later life at Denham Court in Denham, Buckinghamshire and was later Deputy Lieutenant of Buckinghamshire.

In 1905, Swithinbank was elected a Fellow of the Royal Society of Edinburgh. His proposers were Sir German Sims Woodhead, George Newman, Diarmid Noel Paton, and Daniel John Cunningham.

In the First World War, he served as a Commander in the Royal Naval Volunteer Reserve.

Swithinbank died at sea on 9 February 1928 and was buried at sea.

== Family ==
In 1883, Swithinbank married Amy Eno (1855–1942), the daughter of James Crossley Eno of Dulwich (famed for Eno's Liver Salts) in Camberwell, London. They had one son, Crossley Swithinbank (1884–1949), and two daughters, Enid (b. 1887) and Isobel (1891–1979). Isobel married Sir Stafford Cripps, becoming Dame Isobel Cripps, matriarch of the Cripps–Appiah–Edun family.

== Publications ==
- British Sea Fish: An Illustrated Handbook of the Edible Sea Fishes of the British Isles (1900), with George E. Bullen.
- Bacteriology of Milk (1903), with Sir George Newman.
