= Cripps Mission =

Attempt in 1942 by the British government to secure Indian assistance in WWII

The Cripps Mission was a failed attempt in late March 1942 by the British government to secure full Indian cooperation and support for their efforts in World War II. The mission was headed by a senior minister Sir Stafford Cripps. Cripps belonged to the left-wing Labour Party, which was traditionally sympathetic to Indian self-rule, but he was also a member of the coalition War Cabinet led by British Prime Minister Winston Churchill, who had long been the leader of the movement to block Indian independence.

Cripps was sent to negotiate an agreement with the nationalist Congress leaders (including Gandhi), and Muhammad Ali Jinnah and the Muslim League, who was the representative of the Muslim population of the subcontinent. Cripps worked to keep India loyal to the British war effort in exchange for a promise of elections and full self-government (Dominion status) once the war was over. Cripps discussed the proposals, which he had drafted himself with the Indian leaders, and published them. The Congress rejected his proposals and knew that the British were negotiating from a weaker position.

In August 1942, the Congress working committee, taking advantage of the government's weakness, made a call that unless the 'Quit India' call was conceded, the Congress would resort to civil disobedience and call the people to resist and violate government authority. In response, the British imprisoned Congress leadership for the duration of the war. Jinnah, to whom Cripps had offered the right to opt out of a future union with India, supported the war effort with his fellow Muslims and gained in status in British eyes. Jinnah was “surprised” to see that the right to opt out of a future union was undertaken.

== Background ==
The Government of India Act 1935, building on the Round Table Conferences, Simon Commission and the previous Government of India Act of 1919, required the establishment of an All-India Federation, which would allow Indians to take a larger share of governance at the highest level. However, deep differences between the princely states and the Congress, as well as between the Muslim League and Congress, had delayed progress. Instead, only the provincial portion of the Act was carried out.

After Britain's declaration of war on Germany in September 1939, Viceroy Linlithgow responded by declaring India a belligerent state on the side of Britain without consulting Indian political leaders or the elected provincial representatives, sharply underlining the failure of progress to self-rule. That caused considerable resentment in the Congress Party, producing demands for an immediate transfer of power. The resulting standoff led to the en masse resignation of Congress Provincial Governments, giving rise to the prospect of public revolt and political disorder in India. The All India Muslim League, the Hindu Mahasabha and regional parties gave their support to Britain and the war effort in exchange for various concessions. Negotiations continued between the Viceroy, Congress and Muslim League, but their failure led to a political stalemate.

The Japanese declaration of war on the Dutch and the British Empires as well as the United States in December 1941 altered the political situation. Confidence in Britain was particularly low after the fall of Singapore on 15 February 1942, Britain's greatest single defeat in the war, as well as the retreat from Rangoon, with large numbers of Indian Army troops captured. The threat of an invasion of India was real, and there was anxiety about 'fifth columnists', particularly Congress radicals working with Japan.

The British War Cabinet, a coalition government of national unity, was divided on the question of compromise with the Congress. The Labour Party ministers and moderate Conservatives were keen to advance Indian progress to self-government in a way that would not endanger the war effort. Churchill was deeply opposed to any dismantling of the British Empire and regarded its non-white subjects as incapable of self-rule. In fact, the stridency of his views and his opposition to the Conservative leader Stanley Baldwin's agreement to work with parties such as the Indian National Congress towards self-rule had contributed to his isolation within the Conservative Party for a decade. He was supported in his views by the Conservative Secretary of State for India, Leo Amery.

However, the United States, Britain's principal ally, saw things in even more urgent terms. The chief American strategic objective was aiding Chiang Kai Shek's physically isolated Nationalist China against the expanding Japanese Empire. The Japanese conquest of China's coastal areas meant that the Americans needed India to serve as a major logistical hub to funnel aid to China and needed Indian military manpower to secure routes for supplies through Burma. American and Chinese leadership was convinced that would not be possible without the full support of a mobilised Indian population, which required a breakthrough with the Indian National Congress. In addition, the Franklin Roosevelt administration was busy formulating its vision for the post-war world order and saw the decolonisation of Asia as a matter of US national interest for both ideological and commercial reasons.

Despite the conflicts of interests, Britain's reliance on the United States for Lend-Lease supplies for the war effort meant that US President Franklin Roosevelt's pressure had to at least appear to be taken seriously, especially in light of the military disasters in South East Asia. As a result, the British cabinet by 9 March 1942 had agreed to despatch a mission to India to discuss its offer, and Cripps' plane landed in Delhi on 22 March. By then, the British were willing to grant Indian independence at the conclusion of the war. Incidentally, the next day was the second anniversary of the Lahore Resolution of 1940 and so Cripps saw Muslims marching in the streets with green flags.

Cripps stated that while he had been closer to the Congress, he was open to other perspectives. Jinnah waited to find out what the proposals were and stated that the League would reject them if they were not in the interests of Muslims.

== Debate over co-operation or protest ==
The Congress was divided upon its response to India's entry into World War II. Angry over the decision made by the Viceroy, some Congress leaders favoured launching a revolt against the British despite the gravity of the war in Europe, which threatened Britain's own freedom. Others, such as Chakravarti Rajagopalachari, advocated offering an olive branch to the British and supporting them in that crucial time in the hope that the gesture would be reciprocated with independence after the war. Congress' major leader, Gandhi, was opposed to Indian involvement in the war, as he would not morally endorse a war, suspected British intentions and believed that the British were not sincere about Indian aspirations for independence. However, Rajagopalachari, backed by Sardar Vallabhbhai Patel, Maulana Azad and Jawaharlal Nehru, held talks with Cripps and offered full support in return for immediate self-government, and eventual independence.

The British anxiously tried to gain Muslim support during the war and so included a clause that no province would be compelled to join the post war India. Jinnah, the leader of the Muslim League, supported the war effort and condemned the Congress policy. Insisting on Pakistan, a separate Muslim state, he resisted Congress' calls for pan-Indian cooperation and immediate independence.

== Cripps in India ==
Cripps meets Gandhi during the Second World War.

Upon his arrival in India, Cripps held talks with Indian leaders and attempted to satisfy all communities through his proposals. He was a friend of Nehru and did his utmost to arrange an agreement. However, the distrust was too high and many people of influence did not want a settlement to be reached. There is some confusion over what Cripps had been authorized to offer India's nationalist politicians by Churchill and Leo Amery, the Secretary of State for India, and Cripps faced hostility also from Viceroy Linlithgow. Cripps began by offering India full dominion status at the end of the war, with the chance to secede from the Commonwealth and to go for total independence. Privately, Cripps also promised to get rid of Linlithgow and grant India dominion status with immediate effect and insisted only for the Indian Defence Ministry to be reserved for the British.

However, in public, Cripps failed to present any concrete proposals for greater self-government in the short term other than a vague commitment to increase the number of Indian members of the Viceroy's Executive Council. Cripps spent much of his time in encouraging Congress leaders and Jinnah to come to a common, public arrangement in support of the war and the government.

There was little trust between the British and Congress by that stage, and both sides felt that the other was concealing its true plans. The Congress stopped talks with Cripps, and guided by Gandhi, its national leadership demanded immediate self-government in return for war support. Gandhi said that Cripps' offer of Dominion Status after the war was a "post-dated cheque drawn on a failing bank".

== Muslim League reception ==
Jinnah argued that the proposals were merely a draft declaration, did not meet his demands and preferred a scheme of united India. At a press conference on April, he argued that there was no clear concession for Pakistan in the proposals, and he further expressed concern that the Muslim right to self-determination had been ignored. He also expressed criticism for the exclusion of the Muslim League from the later stage of negotiations.

== Quit India Movement ==
When the British remained unresponsive, Gandhi and the Indian National Congress began planning a major public revolt, the Quit India movement, which demanded immediate British withdrawal from India. As the Imperial Japanese Army advanced closer to India with the conquest of Burma, Indians perceived an inability upon the part of the British to defend Indian soil. The invasion force contained elements of the Indian National Army, which had been founded and led by Subhas Chandra Bose to end British control of India. It was composed of Indians, most of whom were prisoners captured with the fall of Singapore in early 1942.

Jinnah's Muslim League condemned the Quit India movement and participated in provincial governments and the legislative councils of the Raj. He encouraged Muslims to participate in the war. With that cooperation, the British continued to administer India for the duration of the war by using officials and military personnel if Indian politicians could not be found. That would not prove to be feasible in the long term, however.

== Causes of failure ==
There are two main reasons behind the causes of the failure of the Cripps' mission. They are listed as follows:

- All of the promises offered were to be fulfilled after the war.
- The behind-the-scenes efforts of Linlithgow and Amery to sabotage the mission

Gupta concludes that documents released in 1970 support the second interpretation. Messages between Linlithgow and Amery reveal that both of them opposed the Cripps Mission and deliberately undercut Cripps. The British government used the Cripps Mission as evidence of its liberal colonial policy, but personal and private correspondence reveals contempt for the mission and elation over its failure.

== Long-term impact ==
The long-term significance of the Cripps Mission really became apparent only in the aftermath of the war, as troops were demobilised and sent back home. Even Churchill recognised that there could be no retraction of the offer of independence that Cripps had made, but by the end of the war, Churchill was out of power and could do nothing but watch as the new Labour government, led by Clement Attlee, gave India independence. That confidence that the British would soon leave was reflected in the readiness with which Congress politicians stood in the elections of 1945–1946 and formed provincial governments.

== Sources ==
- Clarke, Peter. The Cripps Version: The Life of Sir Stafford Cripps 1889-1952 (2003) pp 276–370.
- Clymer, Kenton J. "Franklin D. Roosevelt, Louis Johnson, India, and Anticolonialism: Another Look," Pacific Historical Review, (Aug 1988), 57#3 pp 261–284 in JSTOR
- Gandhi, Rajmohan, Patel: A Life (2008)
- Moore, R. J. Churchill, Cripps and India (Oxford) 1979 chapters 3-5
- Moore, R. J. "The mystery of the Cripps mission," Journal of Commonwealth Political Studies Volume 11, Issue 3, 1973, pages 195-213 online doi:10.1080/14662047308447190
- Owen, Nicholas. "The Cripps mission of 1942: A reinterpretation." Journal of Imperial and Commonwealth History 30.1 (2002): 61–98. doi:10.1080/03086530208583134

=== Primary sources ===
- Winston S. Churchill, The Second World War: Volume IV, The Hinge of Fate, (1950) Book One, Chapter 12, "India—The Cripps Mission"; limited preview of the whole chapter at Google Books
- Mansergh, Nicholas, ed., Constitutional Relations between Britain and India: The Transfer of Power.' Vol. 1: 'The Cripps Mission January–April 1942 (1970).
  - review in JSTOR
