= Nyaduom, Ghana =

Coordinates: 5°55′N 1°32′W

Nyaduom
- Interactive map of Nyaduom
- Country: Ghana
- Region: Central Region
- Time zone: UTC+2 (West Africa Time)

Nyaduom is a town in Central Region, Ghana. Its chiefly family is the extended family of Nana Akroma-Ampim I, who founded the town in ca. the 18th century.

== History ==
Nyaduom was founded by Akroma-Ampim I, who settled it with war captives that he had previously taken into slavery as a general in the army of the Asantehene. Its rule is still vested in the abusua of Akroma-Ampim today.

According to a tradition maintained by the Akroma-Ampims, their patriarch was accompanied to the site of their chiefdom by a chieftess who began to cultivate garden eggs upon arriving there. This in turn led to Nyaduom receiving its current name, which is derived from the Twi for garden egg farm. Both the chieftess and Chief Akroma-Ampim are said to have become the founders of the town's chiefly line thereafter.

The Akroma-Ampim chiefs that have held titles in Nyaduom include the politician Joe Appiah - a founding father of modern Ghana - who was the abusuapanyin of the Akroma-Ampims and therefore Nyaduom's kingmaker, and his son Kwame Anthony Appiah - one of the world's leading academics - who is the nkosuahene of Nyaduom.
