= Experiments in Ethics =

2008 book by Kwame Anthony Appiah

- Author: Kwame Anthony Appiah
- Language: English
- Genre: Non-fiction
- Publication date: 2008

Experiments in Ethics is a 2008 book by the Princeton University philosopher Kwame Anthony Appiah. The book is based on a series of lectures delivered by Appiah in 2005 at Bryn Mawr College.

== Summary ==
Many philosophers have been sceptical about the relevance of empirical moral psychology to ethics. But Appiah points out that philosophy has almost always had an experimental side. David Hume, he says, was "adamant that moral philosophy had to be grounded in facts about human nature, in psychology and history".

The book discusses the degree to which it is possible to combine first-person ethics, such as asking 'what should I do?', with third person observations about human behaviour.

== Contents ==
Chapter One presents a history of Western philosophy, noting that science and observation were usually an essential part of philosophy.

Chapter Two deals with the challenges presented by behavioural science to ethics.

Chapter Three covers intuition, and its role in ethics. The book notes that intuitive responses depend greatly on how a situation is framed.

Chapter Four argue for ethical realism and ethical pluralism, within certain limits.

Chapter Five, the last chapter, concludes that the purpose of ethics is to advise what he calls 'experiments in living', and that philosophy cannot proceed far without science.

== See also ==
- Trolley problem
