= Stafford Cripps =

British politician and diplomat (1889–1952)

The Right Honourable Sir Stafford Cripps CH QC FRS
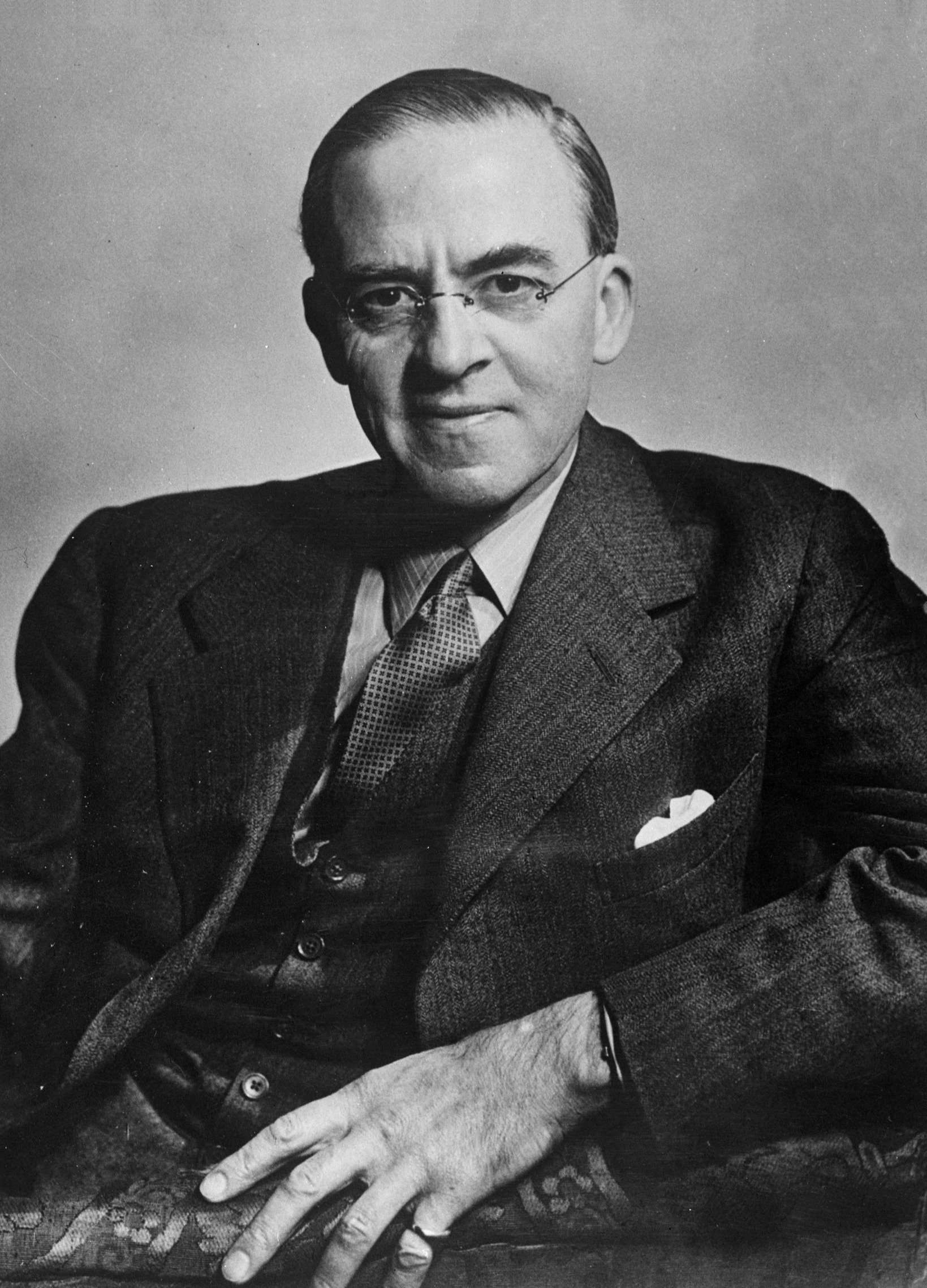

Chancellor of the Exchequer
- In office 13 November 1947 – 19 October 1950
- Prime Minister: Clement Attlee
- Preceded by: Hugh Dalton
- Succeeded by: Hugh Gaitskell

Minister for Economic Affairs
- In office 29 September 1947 – 13 November 1947
- Prime Minister: Clement Attlee
- Preceded by: New creation
- Succeeded by: Post abolished (Trial post)

President of the Board of Trade
- In office 27 July 1945 – 29 September 1947
- Prime Minister: Clement Attlee
- Preceded by: Oliver Lyttelton
- Succeeded by: Harold Wilson

Minister of Aircraft Production
- In office 22 November 1942 – 25 May 1945
- Prime Minister: Winston Churchill
- Preceded by: John Llewellin
- Succeeded by: Ernest Brown

Leader of the House of Commons; Lord Privy Seal
- In office 19 February 1942 – 22 November 1942
- Prime Minister: Winston Churchill
- Preceded by: Winston Churchill (as Leader of the House of Commons); Clement Attlee(as Lord Privy Seal)
- Succeeded by: Anthony Eden; (as Leader of the House of Commons); Robert Gascoyne-Cecil; (as Lord Privy Seal)

Solicitor General for England and Wales
- In office 22 October 1930 – 24 August 1931
- Prime Minister: James Ramsay MacDonald
- Preceded by: James Melville
- Succeeded by: Thomas Inskip

Member of Parliament; for Bristol South East; Bristol East (1931–1950)
- In office 16 January 1931 – 25 October 1950
- Preceded by: Walter John Baker
- Succeeded by: Tony Benn

Personal details
- Born: Richard Stafford Cripps; 24 April 1889 Chelsea, London, England
- Died: 21 April 1952 (aged 62) Zürich, Switzerland
- Party: Labour
- Other political affiliations: Popular Front
- Spouse: Dame Isobel Cripps
- Children: 4, including Peggy Cripps
- Parents: Charles Cripps; Theresa Potter
- Relatives: Kwame Anthony Appiah (grandson)
- Education: University College London

Sir Richard Stafford Cripps CH QC FRS (24 April 1889 – 21 April 1952) was a British Labour Party politician, barrister, and diplomat.

A wealthy lawyer by background, Cripps first entered Parliament at a by-election in January 1931, and was one of a handful of Labour frontbenchers to retain his seat at the October general election that year. He became a leading spokesman for the left wing and for co-operation in a Popular Front with Communists before 1939, in which year the Labour Party expelled him. During this time he became intimately involved with Krishna Menon and the India League.

During World War II (1939–1945), Cripps served from May 1940 to January 1942 as Ambassador to the USSR, with major responsibility for building rapport with Molotov and Stalin, and upon the commencement of Operation Barbarossa in 1941 he was crucial to the forging of the alliance between the USSR and the UK. Back in London in early 1942, he became a member of the War Cabinet of the wartime coalition government.

In March 1942, Prime Minister Winston Churchill sent him to India to negotiate with Indian leaders about Indian cooperation in the war effort in exchange for dominion status after the war. Cripps failed in this mission, as his proposals were too radical for Churchill and the Cabinet, while being too conservative for Mahatma Gandhi and other Indian leaders. Nonetheless, he kept the trust and friendship of V. K. Krishna Menon, allowing him to retain a role in Indian affairs, including as a member of the 1946 Cabinet Mission to India and, ultimately, in having a voice in the selection of the final Viceroy in 1947. From November 1942 he served as Minister of Aircraft Production, an important post, but one outside the inner War Cabinet.

Cripps rejoined the Labour Party in February 1945, and after the war he served in the 1945-1951 Attlee ministry, first as President of the Board of Trade and between 1947 and 1950 as Chancellor of the Exchequer. Labour Party member and historian Kenneth O. Morgan claimed of his role in the latter position that he was "the real architect of the rapidly improving economic picture and growing affluence from 1952 onwards".

The economy improved after 1947, benefiting from American money given through grants from the Marshall Plan as well as from loans. However, the pound had to be devalued in 1949. Cripps kept the wartime rationing-system in place to hold down consumption during an "age of austerity", promoted exports and maintained full employment with static wages. The public especially respected "his integrity, competence, and Christian principles".

== Early life ==
Cripps was born in Chelsea, London, the son of Charles Cripps, a barrister and later Conservative MP, and the former Theresa Potter, the sister of Beatrice Webb and Catherine Courtney. Cripps grew up in a wealthy family and was educated at Winchester College, where the Headmaster described him as "a thoroughly good fellow" and at University College London, where he studied chemistry. He left science for the law, and in 1913 was called to the bar by the Middle Temple. He served in the First World War as a Red Cross ambulance driver in France, and then managed a chemical factory producing armaments. He practised as a barrister during the 1920s, where he specialised in patent cases, and was reported to be the highest paid lawyer in England. He was appointed a King's Counsel in 1927.

Cripps was a member of the Church of England and in the 1920s became a leader in the World Alliance to Promote International Friendship through the Churches, as his father had been. From 1923 to 1929 Cripps was the group's treasurer and its most energetic lecturer.

== Joining the Labour Party ==
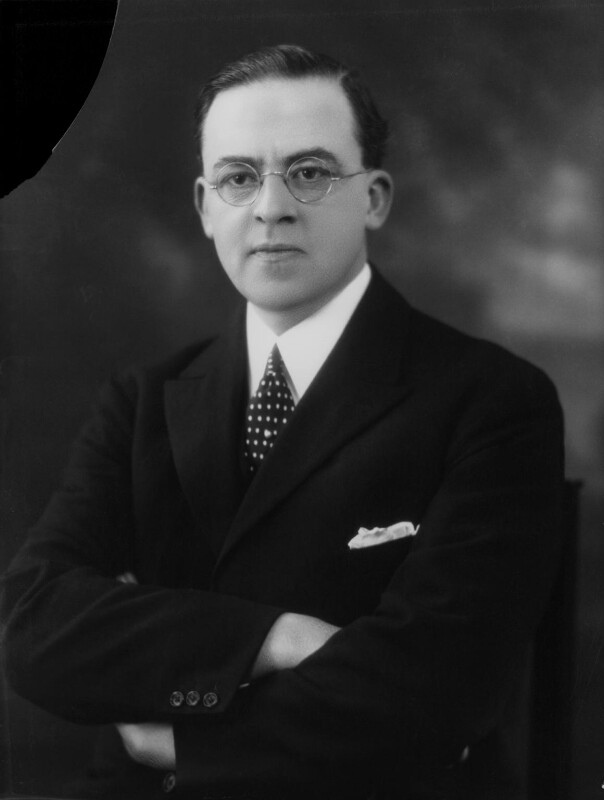
Cripps in 1930

At the end of the 1920s, Cripps moved to the left in his political views, and in 1930 he joined the Labour Party. The next year, he was appointed Solicitor General in the second Labour government, and received the then customary knighthood. In 1931, Cripps was elected to Parliament in a by-election for Bristol East. As an MP, he was a strong proponent of Marxist social and economic policies, although he had strong faith in evangelical Christianity, and did not subscribe to the Marxist rejection of religion.

In the 1931 general election, Cripps was one of only three former Labour ministers to hold his seat, alongside George Lansbury, who subsequently became party leader, and Clement Attlee, deputy leader. In 1932, Cripps helped found and became the leader of the Socialist League, which was composed largely of intellectuals and teachers from the Independent Labour Party who rejected its decision to disaffiliate from Labour. The Socialist League put the case for an austere form of democratic socialism. He argued that on taking power the Labour Party should immediately enact an Emergency Powers Act, allowing it to rule by decree and thus "forestall any sabotage by financial interests", and also immediately abolish the House of Lords.

In 1936, Labour's National Executive Committee dissociated itself from a speech in which Cripps said he did not "believe it would be a bad thing for the British working class if Germany defeated us". Cripps also opposed British rearmament:

Money cannot make armaments. Armaments can only be made by the skill of the British working class, and it is the British working class who would be called upon to use them. To-day you have the most glorious opportunity that the workers have ever had if you will only use the necessity of capitalism in order to get power yourselves. The capitalists are in your hands. Refuse to make munitions, refuse to make armaments, and they are helpless. They would have to hand the control of the country over to you.

Cripps was an early advocate of a united front against the rising threat of fascism and he opposed an appeasement policy towards Nazi Germany. In 1936, he was the moving force behind a Unity Campaign, involving the Socialist League, the Independent Labour Party and the Communist Party of Great Britain, designed to forge electoral unity against the right. Opposed by the Labour leadership, the Unity Campaign failed in its intentions. Rather than face expulsion from Labour, Cripps dissolved the Socialist League in 1937. Tribune, set up as the campaign's newspaper by Cripps and George Strauss, survived. In early 1939, however, Cripps was expelled from the Labour Party for his advocacy of a Popular Front with the Communist Party, the Independent Labour Party, the Liberal Party, and anti-appeasement Conservatives. In 1938, Cripps visited Jamaica to investigate violence which took place during mass strikes. During one of the political meetings he spoke at, the audience included the future pioneer of black civil rights in Britain, Billy Strachan, who had been taken by his father to hear Cripps speak. During this same meeting, the People's National Party was formed.

== Second World War ==
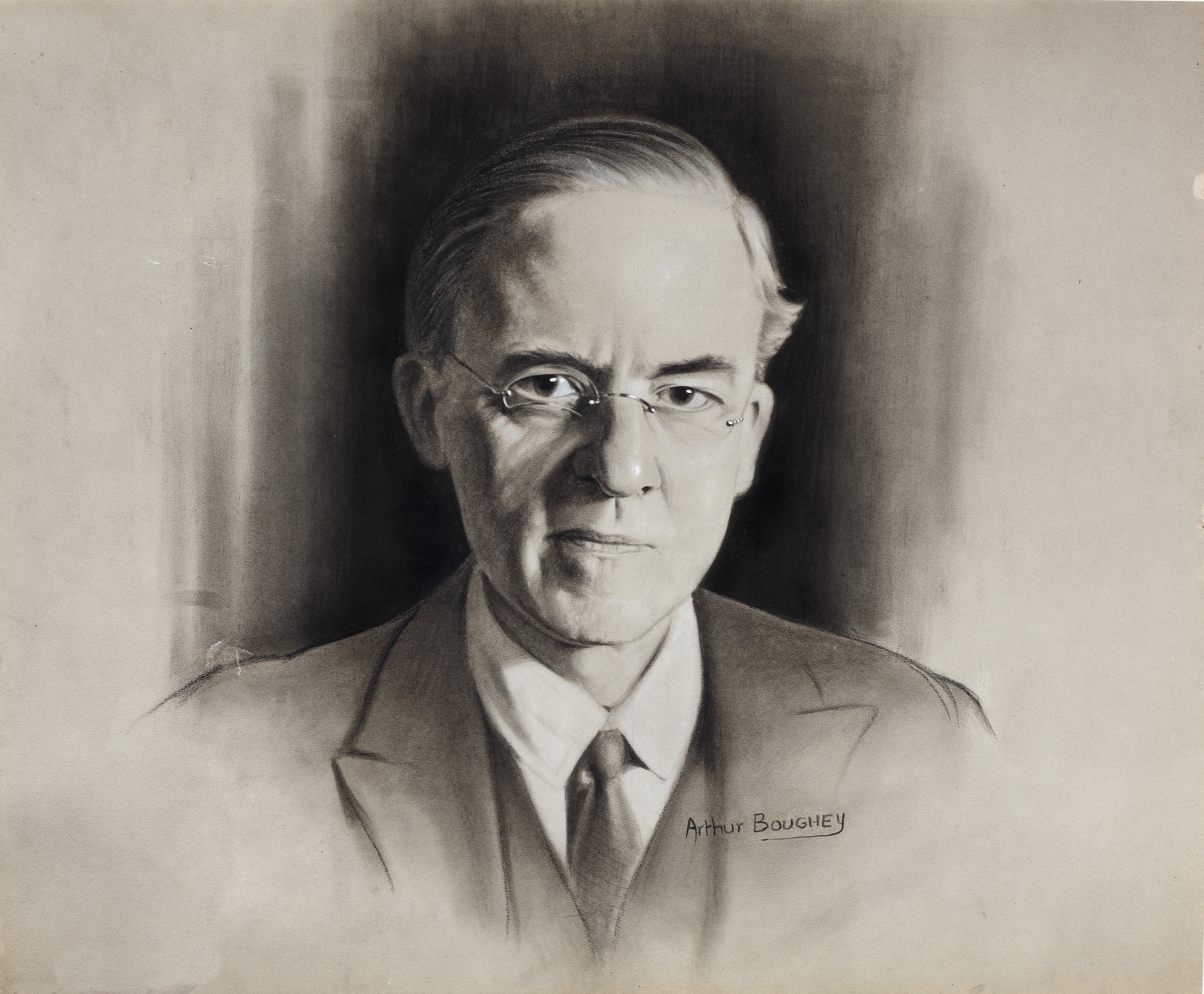
Sketch of Cripps commissioned by the Ministry of Information during the Second World War

Soon after war broke out in October 1939, Cripps set off on an informal five-month world tour with a friend, Geoffrey Masterman Wilson, as his secretary. In India, they met Gandhi, Nehru, and Jinnah, then on to Burma and China, where they met Chiang Kai-shek, then to Moscow, to visit Molotov. They then went on via China to the United States, where Cripps carried out a "propaganda tour", and returned to England in April 1940. On their travels, they jointly kept a shared diary, which came to some 180,000 words.

When Winston Churchill formed his wartime coalition government in 1940 he appointed Cripps Ambassador to the Soviet Union in the view that Cripps, who had Marxist sympathies, could negotiate with Joseph Stalin who had a non-aggression pact with Nazi Germany through the Molotov–Ribbentrop Pact. When Hitler launched Operation Barbarossa, attacking the Soviet Union in June 1941, Cripps became a key figure in forging an alliance between the western powers and the Soviet Union.

In 1942, Cripps returned to Britain and made a broadcast about the Soviet war effort. The popular response was phenomenal, and Cripps rapidly became one of the most popular politicians in the country, despite having no party backing. He was appointed a member of the War Cabinet, with the jobs of Lord Privy Seal and Leader of the House of Commons, and was considered for a short period after his return from Moscow a rival to Churchill in his hold on the country.

=== Mission to India ===
Cripps meeting Mahatma Gandhi during the Second World War

Churchill responded by sending Cripps to India in March 1942. The goal of the Cripps Mission was to negotiate an agreement with the nationalist leaders that would keep India loyal to the British war effort in exchange for self-government after the war. Cripps designed the specific proposals himself, but they were too radical for Churchill and the Viceroy, and too conservative for Mahatma Gandhi and the Indians, who demanded immediate independence. No middle way was found and the mission was a failure.

=== Minister of Aircraft Production ===
In November 1942, Cripps stepped down from being Leader of the House of Commons and was appointed Minister of Aircraft Production, a position outside the War Cabinet in which he served with substantial success until May 1945, when the wartime coalition ended. A supporter of Air Chief Marshal Harris's strategic bombing campaign against Germany, Cripps stated in a July 1943 broadcast that "the more we ... can destroy from the air the industrial and transport facilities of the Axis, the weaker will become his resistance. ... The heavier our air attack, the lighter will be the total of our casualties".

Cripps was unhappy with the British black propaganda campaign against Germany. When Cripps discovered details of the German radio work of Sefton Delmer (through the intervention of Richard Crossman) he wrote to Anthony Eden, then Foreign Secretary: "If this is the sort of thing that is needed to win the war, why, I'd rather lose it." Delmer was defended by Robert Bruce Lockhart who pointed out the need to reach the sadist in the German nature.

In February 1945, Cripps rejoined the Labour Party.

== After the war ==
When Labour won the 1945 general election, Clement Attlee appointed Cripps President of the Board of Trade, the second most important economic post in the government. Although still a strong socialist, Cripps had modified his views sufficiently to be able to work with mainstream Labour ministers. In Britain's desperate post-war economic circumstances, Cripps became associated with the policy of "austerity". As an upper-class socialist, he held a puritanical view of society, enforcing rationing with equal severity against all classes. Together with other individuals, he was instrumental in the foundation of the original College of Aeronautics, now Cranfield University, in 1946. The Stafford Cripps Learning and Teaching Centre on Cranfield's campus is named after him.

In 1946, Soviet jet engine designers approached Stalin with a request to buy jet designs from Western sources to overcome design difficulties. Stalin is said to have replied: "What fool will sell us his secrets?" He gave his assent to the proposal, and Soviet scientists and designers travelled to the United Kingdom to meet Cripps and request the engines. To Stalin's amazement, Cripps and the Labour government were willing to provide technical information on the Rolls-Royce Nene centrifugal-flow jet engine designed by RAF officer Frank Whittle, along with discussions of a licence to manufacture Nene engines. The Nene engine was promptly reverse-engineered and produced in modified form as the Soviet Klimov VK-1 jet engine, later incorporated into the MiG-15 which flew in time for use against UN forces in North Korea in 1950, causing the loss of several B-29 bombers and cancellation of their daylight bombing missions over North Korea.

Also in 1946, Cripps returned to India as part of the Cabinet Mission, which proposed formulae for independence to the Indian leaders. The other two members of the delegation were Lord Pethick-Lawrence, the Secretary of State for India, and A. V. Alexander, the First Lord of the Admiralty. The solution devised by the three men, known as the Cabinet Mission Plan, was unsatisfactory to the Indian National Congress mainly its principal leaders, and instead of having to hold together the emerging one nation, Indian National Congress leaders travelled further down the road that eventually led to Partition.

In 1947, amid a growing economic and political crisis, Cripps tried to persuade Attlee to retire in favour of Ernest Bevin, who was in favour of Attlee remaining. Cripps was instead appointed to the new post of Minister for Economic Affairs. Six weeks later Hugh Dalton resigned as Chancellor of the Exchequer and Cripps succeeded him, with the position of Minister for Economic Affairs now merged with the Chancellorship. He increased taxes and continued strategic rationing which muted consumption to boost the balance of trade and stabilise the Pound Sterling seeing Britain trade its way out of a risk of fiscal and economic gloom. He was among those who brought about the nationalisation of strategic industries such as coal and steel.

Amid financial problems from 1948 to 1949, Cripps maintained a high level of social spending on housing, health, and other welfare services, while also maintaining the location of industry policy. Personal incomes and free time continued to rise, as characterised by cricket and football enjoying unprecedented booms, together with the holiday camps, the dance hall, and the cinema. In his last budget as Chancellor (1950), the house building programme was restored to 200,000 per annum (after having previously been reduced due to government austerity measures), income tax was reduced for low-income earners as an overtime incentive, and spending on health, national insurance, and education was increased.

During the period Cripps imposed harsh foreign currency restrictions on private and commercial travellers, he was paying for his grandchildren's Swiss boarding school and for both his daughter's and his own Swiss sanatorium.

Cripps had suffered for many years from colitis, inflammation of the lower bowel; a condition aggravated by stress. In 1950, his health broke down and he was forced to resign his office in October. He resigned from Parliament the same month, and at the resulting by-election on 30 November he was succeeded as the MP for Bristol South East by Anthony Wedgwood Benn.

== Personal life ==
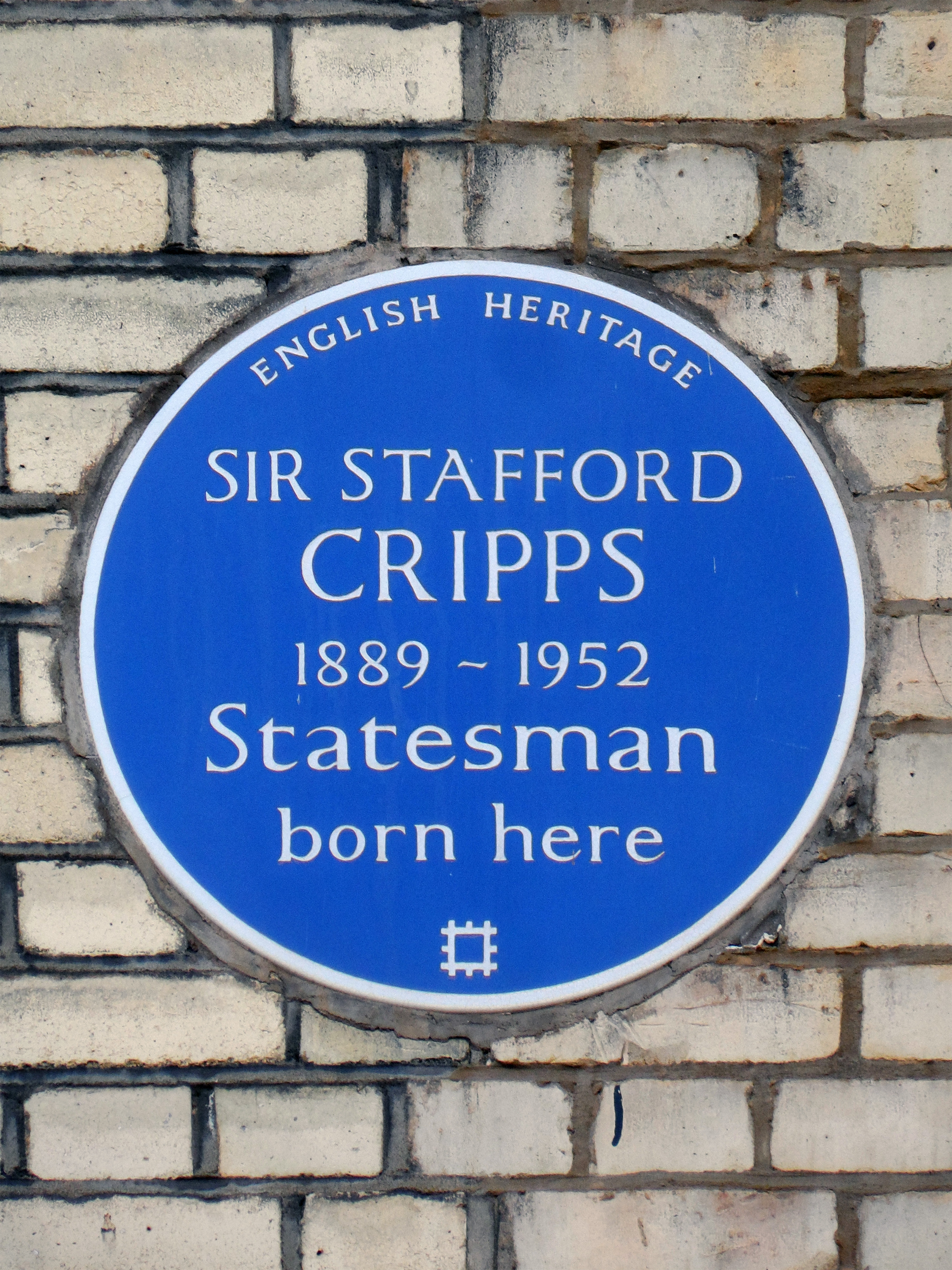
The blue plaque at 32 Elm Park Gardens, London, commemorating Cripps's birthplace.

Cripps was the sororal nephew of Beatrice Webb and Catherine Courtney. His mother died when he was four years old. His stepmother, Marian Ellis, had a profound influence on him. He was married to the daughter of Harold William Swithinbank, Isobel Swithinbank, who became the Honourable Lady Cripps, better known as Dame Isobel Cripps (1891–1979). They had four children:

- Sir John Stafford Cripps (1912–1993), journalist and campaigner, who was a conscientious objector in the Second World War and in 1937 married Ursula Davy, having four sons and two daughters.
- Isobel Diana Cripps (1913–1985) who died unmarried
- (Anne) Theresa Cripps (1919–1998), who was married 1945 to Sir Robert Cornwallis Gerald St. Leger Ricketts, 7th Bt, and had two sons and two daughters. The elder son Sir Tristram Ricketts, 8th Bt. succeeded his father, died in 2007, and has been succeeded by his own son, Sir Stephen Ricketts, 9th Bt.
- Peggy Cripps, born Enid Margaret Cripps (1921–2006), children's author and philanthropist. Peggy Cripps shocked much British opinion by marrying the black African aristocrat Nana Joseph Emmanuel Appiah (1918–1990), a relative of the Ashanti king of Ghana, in June 1953. Peggy Appiah had one son and three daughters. Her son is the philosopher Kwame Anthony Appiah (b. May 1954 London), the Laurance S. Rockefeller professor of philosophy at Princeton University. Her three daughters live in Namibia, Nigeria, and Ghana and have eight children among them. One of them is the actor Adetomiwa Edun.

Cripps was a vegetarian, certainly for health reasons and possibly also for ethical reasons. "Cripps suffered from recurring illness which was alleviated by nature cure and a vegetarian diet...". His male-line descendants are in remainder to the barony Parmoor. In 1989, a blue plaque was unveiled at 32 Elm Park Gardens, Chelsea to mark the site of Cripps' birth.

== Death ==
Cripps died of cancer on 21 April 1952 while in Zürich, Switzerland 3 days shy of his 63rd birthday. He was cremated at Sihlfeld Crematorium in Zürich. His ashes are buried in the churchyard in Sapperton, Gloucestershire, and his wife is buried beside him.

The Stafford Cripps estate on Gee Street in the former Metropolitan Borough of Finsbury is named in his honour; the three blocks are called Parmoor, Sapperton and Cotswold, after the Cripps family title and Sir Stafford Cripps resting place.

== See also ==
- List of ambulance drivers during World War I
- Cripps question (patent law)

Parliament of the United Kingdom
Preceded by Walter Baker	Member of Parliament for Bristol East; 1931–1950	Constituency abolished
New constituency	Member of Parliament for Bristol South East; 1950–Oct. 1950	Succeeded by Anthony Wedgwood Benn
Legal offices
Preceded by Sir James Melville	Solicitor General for England and Wales; 1931	Succeeded by Sir Thomas Inskip
Political offices
Preceded by Winston Churchill	Leader of the House of Commons; 1942	Succeeded by Anthony Eden
Preceded by Clement Attlee	Lord Privy Seal; 1942	Succeeded by Viscount Cranborne
Preceded by John Llewellin	Minister of Aircraft Production; 1942–1945	Succeeded by Ernest Brown
Preceded by Oliver Lyttleton	President of the Board of Trade; 1945–1947	Succeeded by Harold Wilson
New office	Minister for Economic Affairs; 1947	office abolished
Preceded by Hugh Dalton	Chancellor of the Exchequer; 1947–1950	Succeeded by Hugh Gaitskell
Party political offices
Preceded by Frank Wise	Chairman of the Socialist League; 1933–1936	Succeeded by William Mellor
Preceded by Beatrice Webb	President of the Fabian Society; 1951–1952	Succeeded by G. D. H. Cole
Academic offices
Preceded by Edward Evans	Rector of the University of Aberdeen; 1942–1945	Succeeded by Eric Linklater
