= J. W. K. Appiah =

Ghanaian politician

James W.K. Appiah (/ˈæpiɑː/ AP-ee-ah, fl. c.1950s) was a Ghanaian statesman. He served as secretary of the Ashanti Confederacy.

A schoolmaster, Methodist leader and traditional nobleman, Appiah was immensely influential in Ashanti affairs and also contributed to the struggle for independence in the wider Gold Coast. His family, the Appiahs, have remained prominent in contemporary Ghana.
