= Akyempimhene =

Ghanaian chieftain title

Akyempimhene, or vice-king, is the title bestowed upon one of the chiefs in the Ashanti Kingdom, located in Ghana, Africa. The throne is occupied by a son of any Ashanti king (Asantehene), and he takes care of the royal family. The Akyempimhene represents the king, along with the king's sub-chiefs. He is also part of the Kumasi traditional council, which oversees the city. The current Akyempimhene is Oheneba Adusei Poku, son of the late Otumfuo Nana Poku Ware. Oheneba was enstooled in 1992. He is a Harvard Law School graduate.
