= Kofi Antubam =

Ghanaian artist, designer and educator

Kofi Antubam (1922–1964), was a Ghanaian artist and designer. His work as official "state artist", appointed by Kwame Nkrumah, shaped the national identity of the newly independent country of Ghana. Antubam's art practice included easel painting, mural and mosaic, and wood carving. As an educator and writer he encouraged Ghanaian artists and students to create work with an "African personality", that reflect local customs and traditions. His government commissions to design the symbols of state introduced the Akan adinkra symbols and traditions to represent the new nation state. In one prominent scholar's view, according to Antubam, "certain cultural traditions belonged to societies past; they were important and should be studied, but their principle utility was in supporting new, composite forms for the symbolic repertoire of the new nation."

He was the founding president of the Ghana Society of Artists and a member of the Arts Council of Ghana. Antubam's artwork is in the national collections of Ghana, South Africa, and the United Kingdom.

== Life ==
Antubam was born in 1922 to the family of Maame and Nana Mensah. His father died when Antubam was at a young age, thereafter his uncle took him to Kumasi to start his education. He later spent some time in Jos, Nigeria, and also at Adisadel College. It was while at Adisadel College that he was encouraged to develop his craft. The principal, Father John Knight suggested to the governor, Arnold Hodson to commission the young Antubam to make a clay bust. After favorable reception of the sculpted work, he obtained sponsorship to attend Achimota College. At Achimota College, he was a pupil of a Russian-born sculptor and art teacher, Herbert Vladimir Meyerowitz, a teacher who encouraged his students to absorb everyday community life as inspiration and not just copying European art traditions. Antubam's years at Achimota included completing an arts and craft course, teacher training course and a primary course. After graduation, Antubam supported himself through teaching, he also produced and sold figurative paintings. Between 1948 and 1950, he won a scholarship to study at Goldsmiths College, London.

In the 1950s, Antubam developed various works of arts and craft including Nkrumah's presidential mace and chair, various state commissioned relief mural carvings. Antubam also designed stamps for Ghana.

In 1963, he published Ghana's Heritage of Culture, a book that treats Ghana's contribution to the world of art and a medium Antubam used to make a case for a national art that represents Ghana's political and cultural history.
