= Chieftaincy institution (Ghana) =

System that regulates the activity of local chieftains

The chieftaincy institution in Ghana is a system that structures and regulates the activity of local chieftains in the Ghanaian society and state. This institution served as the governing structure of various societies in Ghana prior to European colonisation.

== History ==
In pre-colonial times, chieftaincy leadership was the axis of executive, legislative and judicial powers. Since the colonial era, the institution has been linked to Ghanaian politics. Several governments - the colonial, civilian, or military - have attempted, in one way or another, to influence the role of chiefs in political affairs. The legislation that underpins the chieftaincy institution in Ghana currently is Ghana's constitution (chapter 270–277) and the chieftaincy act of 2008.

== Categories of chiefs ==
The chiefs are divided by the act of leadership into 5 categories (as for authority):

1. Paramount chiefs
2. Divisional chiefs
3. Sub-divisional chiefs
4. Adikrofo
5. Other minor chiefs not falling within any of the preceding categories as are recognized by the Regional House of Chiefs.

This popular hierarchy system informally divides chiefs between royalty and nobility, using the European comparative scale of equivalence:

=== Royalty ===
They are the monarchs proper, who prevailed before colonisation with sovereignty or complete autonomy (depending on the primacy). We can divide in:

- Emperor: The leader of a whole ethnic group, usually referred to only as a king, but acting as "king of kings". It consists of a Chief Paramount Chief who has a primacy (currently only ceremonial) over all other chiefs of his ethnic group. One example is the Ashanti people who are led by the Asantehene of Asante.
- King: The paramount chief leads a traditional area, which can range from a grouping of towns and villages to a sub-ethnic group. He is always the chief (prince) of the capital of a traditional area and by his primacy is the chairman of the traditional council of his area. He is always present when a subordinate prince is installed.
- Prince: The division chief is the base ruler of the system and is equated with a sovereign prince. The primary determinant of whether he will be a supreme chief (king or emperor) or not will be the size, relevance, and antiquity of the community (city, village group, or village) that he governs, as well as matriarchal lineage. His function is similar to that of a hereditary mayor, since the basic unit of elective Ghana is the district.

=== Nobility ===
The primary difference between the nobility and traditional royalty is the "stools" which the latter possess, that is, the thrones. Just as royal titles are very diverse and vary from ethnicity to ethnicity, so too are those of nobles, but when comparing them to the basic categories of the Western European standard we have:

- Duke / Marquis: Development King or Chief: This is an honorific title, which is received by the installation ceremony and its protocol is similar to that of the royal chiefs, which makes him somewhat equivalent to the duke, who in turn in the West is the noble that most approaches the position of the prince. They are granted by each divisional chief (as a fons honorum) with the aim of seeking sponsors for his community. The title is a recent one in Ghana, and has been criticized for the confusion of its bearers with traditional kings. Often, those who receive it do not honor their commitment to development.
- Head of Clan: Similar to the Scottish nobility the head of a sub-division is known as a clan chief within the traditional community. Sometimes, they are part of a divisional council.
- Lord: The Adikrofo (a title that can vary from region to region) is the base of the system, without a city or class to lead but respected and at the service of every community.

=== Chivalry ===
A relatively new phenomenon has been observed in Ghana, as in other parts of Africa. Dynastic orders related to the royal chiefs and their lineages have begun to appear. Some examples:

- Royal Order of the Lion of Godenu
- Royal Order of the Golden Leopard
- Royal Order of Kwakyen Ababio

== Notable chiefs ==
=== Asantehene and paramount chiefs ===
- Otumfuo Nana Osei Tutu II – Asantehene
- King Tackie Teiko Tsuru II – Ga Mantse
- Togbe Afede XIV
- Torgbui Sri III, Awormefia of Anlo State
- Emintsinminim Otu XI [Omanhen Abora State][ https://www.graphic.com.gh/images/2024/july/28/Paramount_Chiefs_Petition_to_Paliament_of_Ghana.pdf]
- OKOGYEMAN OKESE ESSANDOH IX NKUSUKUM TRADITIONAL AREA [ https://www.graphic.com.gh/images/2024/july/28/Paramount_Chiefs_Petition_to_Paliament_of_Ghana.pdf]
- OSAGYEFO AMANFO EDU VI MANKESSIM TRADITIONAL AREA [ https://www.graphic.com.gh/images/2024/july/28/Paramount_Chiefs_Petition_to_Paliament_of_Ghana.pdf]
- Gariba II[Yaa Naa of Dagbon]
- Naba Asigri Abugrago Azoka II [ Zug-Raan of Kusaug]
- Nene Klagbodjor Animle V
- Osagyefo Nana Amanfo Edu VI
- Nana Agyeman Badu II [Dormaahene]
- Nana Akumfi Ameyaw IV
- Okakaben Idun Andoh X [Kwaman State Omanhen-Kwamankese Traditional Area]

Nana Kwame Baffoe IV [Nkoranzahene]

=== Divisional ===
- Togbe Osei III[]
- Nana Kwasi Suamena II
- Nana Òkofrobòur Ababio II
- Nana Kojo Kurentsir X
- Nana Agyemang Duah III
- Gumbo Naba Assibi Azonko
- Pusiga Naba Tambiisbalug

=== Development ===
- Bob Geldof
- LisaRaye McCoy

== See also ==
- Akan chieftaincy
- Kingdom of Dagbon
- National House of Chiefs
- List of current non-sovereign African monarchs
