= John Cripps (journalist) =

British journalist and campaigner

Sir John Stafford Cripps, CBE (10 May 1912 – 9 August 1993) was a British journalist and campaigner. He was chairman of the Countryside Commission from 1970 to 1977.

He was the son of the Labour politician Sir Stafford Cripps, and was a conscientious objector in the Second World War. In 1937, he married Ursula Davy, having four sons and two daughters with her.
