= Akan chieftaincy =

Ghanaian tradition of Akans

In many parts of West Africa, there is an old chieftaincy tradition, and the Akan people have developed their own hierarchy, which exists alongside the democratic structure of the country. The Akan word for the ruler, or one of his various courtiers, is "Nana" (English pronunciation /ˈnænə/). In colonial times, Europeans translated it as "chief", but that is not an exact equivalent. Other sources speak of "kings", which is also not entirely correct, especially in the case of the said courtiers. The term "chief" has become common even among modern Ghanaians, though it would be more correct to use the expression "Nana" without translation wherever possible.

== History ==
The roots of Akan chieftaincy are unknown, and written sources are scarce. When the Akan were settling in Bonoman, in the period before 1300, Bonos had already long used the chieftaincy system. The paramount chief held a position that can be compared to that of an absolutist king.

When the Republic of Ghana was founded in 1957, it was agreed that the chieftaincy system should be respected.

== Present time ==
Chieftaincy is officially accepted. Politicians ask chiefs for advice because usually they are closer to the people. The highest committee is the National House of Chiefs in Kumasi. There are also Regional Houses of Chiefs. In case of problems between the chiefs, the House of Chiefs has a legal function to adjudicate in such matters.

== Hierarchy ==
Within the Akan ethnic group there are different kin groups, such as the Ashanti, Bono, Akyem, Kwahu, Akwapim, Assin, or the Fante, [Denkyira]. The highest ranked of the entire Akan chieftaincy institution is the paramount chief.

Ranked below the Paramount chief are the sub-chiefs. A sub-chief can be compared to the mayor of a town, except that his office is hereditary as opposed to elective. The chiefs have their own territories, and apart from overseeing them, they have a function at the courts of their paramount chiefs as their ministers. Most of the functions are traditional, while some have been created recently:

A chief arbitrates and decides political and economic questions in his area. When he is installed, he receives a stool name. Usually, all chiefs who belong to a reigning lineage have the same name – an ordinal being added to distinguish between all of them.

=== Ahenfo ===
Ahemfo is the general title for native city-state rulers in Akan culture. Historically, Ohene, the most common title for the King is the singular form of Ahemfo.

=== Ohemaa ===
Ohemaa is the feminine version of Ohene and means Queen or female ruler. However Henewaa or Heneba (with the feminine suffix wa or ba) is sometimes used for the child of a Chief whether male or female.

=== Omanhene/Ohenpong ===
The English translation of the title Omanhene/Ohenpong (pl. Amanhene) is Paramount Chief. In rare cases, Queens themselves would be Custodians of the Chieftaincy until a relevant male from the Royal Household is chosen as chief. This and the position of Obaapanin or Queen are the only ones that are obtained through descent from the ruling clan.

=== Krontihene ===
The Krontihene is caretaker of the land and second-in-command after the Omanhene. The krontihene Services as regent like the mamponghene who is the krontihene of Asante.

=== Ankobeahene ===
Ankobea means one who stays at home or does not go anywhere. The Ankobeahene is the caretaker of the palace.

=== Obaatan ===
Obaatan means "parent" and is a female role. Her symbol is the egg, out of which all other chiefs came. She is Omanhene's counsellor. When Omanhene's stool is vacant, Obaatan suggests the next incumbent. She is expected to consider all factors such as the character of the available candidates, their royal descent and their contribution to the royal family. Mostly the lineage and order of birth is given a paramount consideration in the selection process. Although found in other traditions, the position of Obaatan does not fit into the Akan chieftaincy structure proper. The one who suggests and nominates the Omanhene amongst the Akans is the Obaahemaa (or Queen mother).

=== Tufohene ===
The "warlord" is the head of all the Asafo companies and the defense minister (or head of the gunners). Tufohene translates loosely in Akan as 'the chief of the gunners'. The chief heads several activities in the town.He enforces all by-laws made by the chief and his sub chiefs.He enforces all customs and he is the chief who expels all malcontents from the town.When the chief and the sub chiefs decide that the a particular resident should no longer live in the when the town. It is the Tufohene who enforces that decision. The Tufohene is therefore is linked to the Police Commander or the state attorney in his duties. He prosecutes all those who fail to participate communal labour; the general welfare of the town is his responsibility. ln time of war, he keeps all war plans implemented. Tufohene is the chief of the gunners. Tufohene's position is very common among Akuapem and Fanti's. In Ashanti the full word is Atuntufouhene. Nana Boakye Dankwa, the father of Otumfuo Osei Tutu l, was the first Tufuhene of Ashanti Confederacy.

=== Asafohene ===
The Asafohene is the head of a single Asafo company.

=== Manwerehene ===
The head of the interior.

=== Sanaahene ===
The head of the treasury.

=== Fekuo ===
There are four positions or Fekuo describing military flanks. The Adonten Fekuo, the Benkum Fekuo, the Nifa Fekuo and the Kyidom Fekuo. The Fekuo are led by Abusuapanin(family elders) of noble clans of the land, thus making these hereditary positions.

=== Adontenhene ===
The Adontenhene is the one who goes in front of the army.

=== Kyidomhene ===
The Kyidomhene is the leader of the rear guard. He collects the soldiers who are left behind and sends them back to the army. During Odambea, the Nkyidom always sits in the last palanquin.

=== Nifahene ===
The Nifahene holds the right flank of the army's formation.

=== Benkumhene ===
The Benkumhene holds the left flank of the army's formation (also in modern governance known as the left wing).

== Recent Titles only in Akan Chieftaincy ==
=== Akyempimhene ===
If there is anything to distribute or to share, the Akyempimhene (or vice-king) has to do it. He is the first son of the king. He also protects the king, his father, with each king deciding whether to give the title to his literal son or to a close favourite. He also enjoys the authority of arriving in a palanquin after the Asantehene is seated; he alone has that authority to do so. He is also the head of all the Kumasi royals. Otumfuo Opoku Ware (Katakyie) created this title. Usually the first sons of the kings are the ones that ascend this stool. He is also the head of the Kyidom clan. Due to the matrilineal system of inheritance, sons do not automatically succeed their fathers as kings. Kings are by and large selected from among the sons of the deceased king's close female relations. This title is therefore a convenient means of ennobling a king's son without upsetting the royal succession.

=== Mankrado ===
The Mankrado's function is purification. He puts leaves into water, then sprinkles it over the Omanhene. He also always has salt in his pocket so that he can make things taste better for the Omanhene.

=== Guantuahene ===
The title of the Guantuahene is a comparatively recent innovation. The Guantoahene is the one to whom people can turn for shelter and mercy.

=== Nsumankwahene ===
The Nsumankwahene watches the oracle. This title is also a relatively recent creation. The Nsumankwahene is a spiritual head of the community/communities. In the past it was the chief priest who performed this role.

=== Nkosuohene ===
The Nkosuohene is responsible for the development of the region. The Nkosuohene was created to honor someone who does not have to be a member of a royal family. Created by the Ashanti but popular with other Akans, a small number of selected foreigners have been honored with this title which appreciates the contribution of non-royals.

== Entourage ==
=== Okomfo ===
The most important person in the chief's entourage is the priest or priestess (Okomfo). Traditionally, the priest tells the chief when it is time to start a war or to marry, for example.

=== Stool Wife ===
There is also a stool wife. No matter whether a chief is married or not, when installed, he will be married to a very young girl. Having a stool wife is obligatory, and polygamy is still legal in Ghana. Today, the symbolic act of marriage is sufficient, however. During parades, a stool wife sits in front of the chief.

=== Okyeame ===
A chief has one or more linguists (Okyeame). A chief never talks in public, but conveys messages through his linguist, who is also responsible for the pouring of libations.

== Queen Mother ==
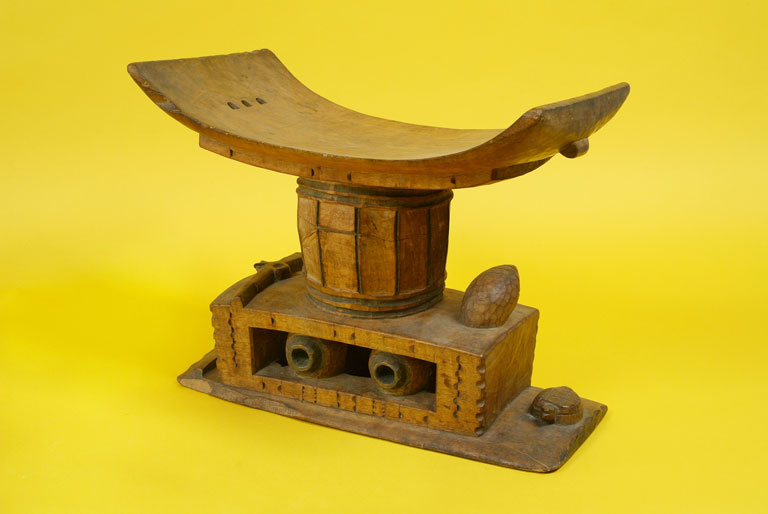
An Akan stool believed to be for a Queen mother, 1940–1965, in the collection of the Children's Museum of Indianapolis

The title of Queen mother Ohemmaa can relate to the rank of a paramount queen, a queen or a sub-queen. The Akan honorific is the same as for the men, "Nana". When using English, Ghanaians often say "queen mother". This woman is not necessarily the respective chief's mother, although she is usually related to him. Her role in the system is to have an eye on the social conditions, and a personally capable Queen mother has been known to equal or even surpass a reigning chief in terms of power and prestige. A good example of this happening is the case of Queen Yaa Asantewaa. The Queen mother (or Ohemaa) is expected to nominate someone to the position of the chief if it should become vacant. In some areas, this function is performed by the Abusuapanyin (or head of the clan) in consultation with other family members instead.

== Regalia ==
=== Personal ornaments ===
On special occasions, chiefs wear the traditional cloth, which is a six-yard-long piece of fabric, wrapped around the body and worn as a toga. Female chiefs wear two pieces of fabric that can be of different designs.

The jewellery is very ample and used to be made of gold. Nowadays, most chiefs wear imitation gold. The head-dress usually takes the form of a crown. It can be made of metal or of black velvet, ornamented with metal. Chiefs have traditional sandals, and the wearing of sandals is symbolic for them. When a chief abdicates, he takes off his sandals.

=== Fly-whisk (Bodua) ===
When riding in a palanquin, chiefs hold a fly-whisk in one hand and a ceremonial sword in the other. The fly-whisk is made of animal hair.

=== Sword (Afena) ===
The ceremonial short sword is used for animal sacrifice. The chief touches the animal's throat symbolically with his sword before someone else cuts it with a sharp knife.

=== Palanquin (Apakan) ===
During a durbar, which is a special parade, some chiefs are carried in a palanquin. Subchiefs have to walk. The palanquins can have the form of a chair or of a bed.

=== Stool (Dwa) ===
Instead of a throne, Akan chiefs traditionally sit on a stool. When they die, their stools are painted black and stored in a sacred room. This sacred room is called Nkonwafie (stool house). If the deceased chief was the first to have sat on that stool, the person's name becomes the first I. Whoever sits on that stool in the future would be called by the first chief's name but would have II attached. The name becomes the new chief's stool name.

=== Umbrella (Bamkyim) ===
Very large umbrellas made of silk and other rich fabrics are used to shade a chief and show from afar that a chief is approaching.

== Sources ==
As there is not much written information, oral sources have to be quoted:

- Mr. Anthony Alick Eghan, Yamoransa (Central Region, Ghana)
  - Kofi Owusu Yeboah, Ejisu-Onwe (Ashanti Region)

== Literature ==
- Antubam, Kofi, Ghana's Heritage of Culture, Leipzig, 1963
- Kyerematen, A. A. Y., Panoply of Ghana, London, 1964
- Meyerowitz, Eva L. R., Akan Traditions of Origin, London, 1952
- Meyerowitz, Eva L. R., At the Court of an African King, London, 1962
- Obeng, Ernest E., Ancient Ashanti Chieftaincy, Tema, Ghana, 1986
