= List of patent medicines =

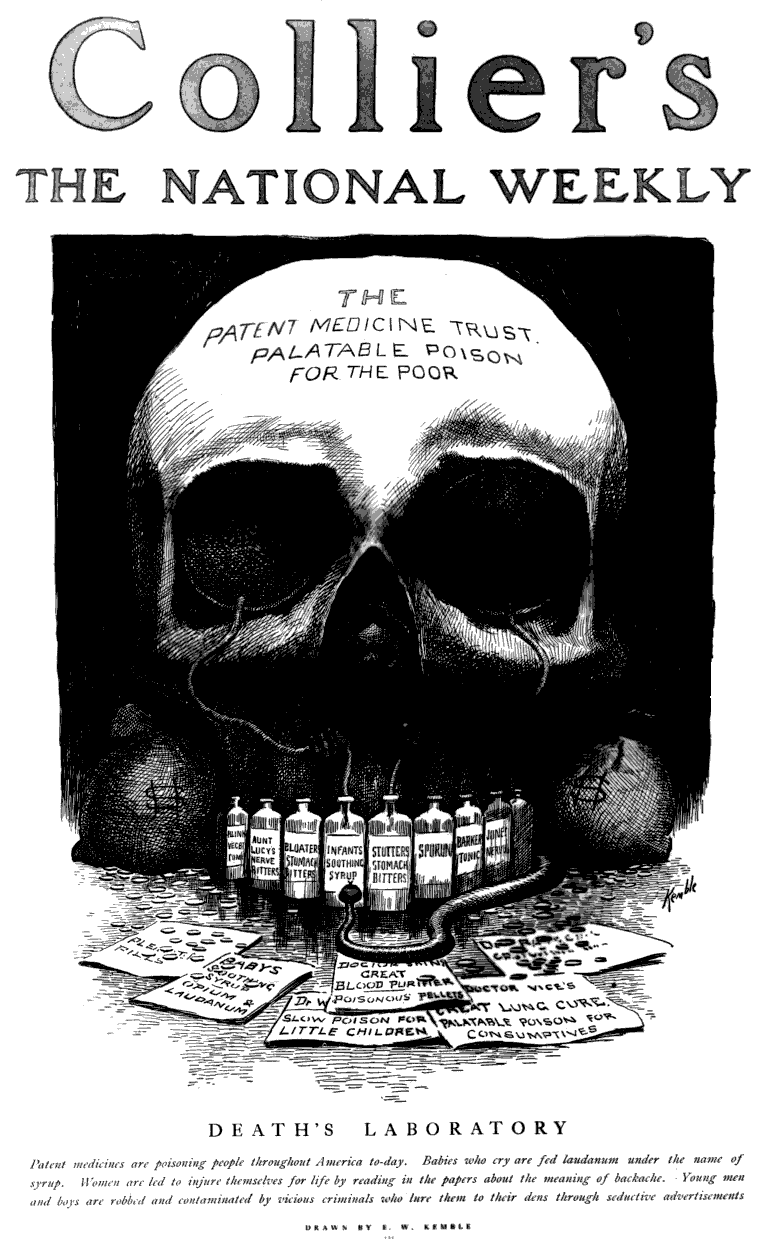
E. W. Kemble's "Death's Laboratory" on the cover of Collier's (June 3, 1905)

A patent medicine, also known as a proprietary medicine or a nostrum (from the Latin nostrum remedium, or "our remedy") is a commercial product advertised to consumers as an over-the-counter medicine, generally for a variety of ailments, without regard to its actual effectiveness or the potential for harmful side effects. The earliest patent medicines were created in the 17th century. They were most popular from the mid-19th century to the early 20th century, before the advent of consumer protection laws and evidence-based medicine. Despite the name, patent medicines were usually trademarked but not actually patented, in order to keep their formulas secret.

Patent medicines often included alcohol and drugs such as opium as active ingredients. Addiction and overdose were common as a result. Some formulations included toxic ingredients such as arsenic, lead, and mercury. Other ingredients like sarsaparilla and wintergreen may have been medically inert and largely harmless, but lacked significant medical benefits. It was rare for any patent medication to be pharmacologically effective, and none lived up to the miraculous promises made by their advertising.

Patent medicine advertising was typically outlandish, eye-catching, and had little basis in reality. Advertisements emphasized exotic or scientific-sounding ingredients, featured endorsements from purported experts or celebrities, and often claimed that products were universal remedies or panaceas. Beginning in the early 20th century, the passage of consumer protection laws in countries like the United Kingdom, United States, and Canada began to regulate deceptive advertising and put limits on what ingredients could be used in medicines, putting an end to the dominance of patent medicines. Although some modern alternative medicines bear similarities to patent medicines, the term most typically refers to remedies created before modern regulations, and the scope of this list reflects that.

== Types of patent medicine ==
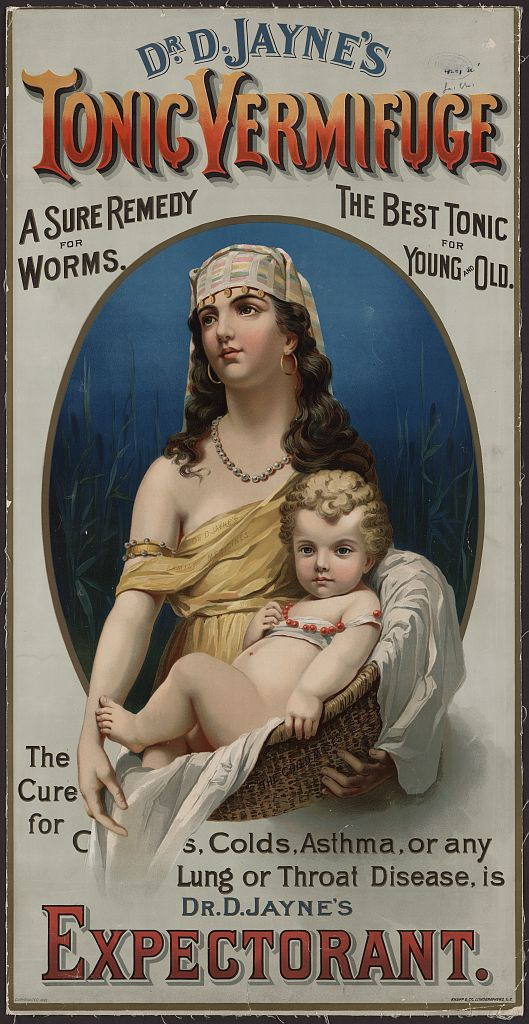
1889 lithograph advertisement

Various types of pre-scientific medical preparations, some based on folk or traditional remedies, were sold as patent medicines. Because patent medicines were unscientific and unregulated, the brand names of many products were not necessarily an accurate reflection of their ingredients or preparation methods.

- Aphrodisiac: patent medicine advertisements often claimed aphrodisiac effects, the language of which ranged from euphemistic hints at "re-animation" and "potency" to extremely blatant promises of "sexual rejuvenescence."
- Balsam: a solution of plant-specific resins in plant-specific solvents (essential oils); balsams have been used in medicine since prehistory.
- Coca wine: an infusion of coca leaves in red wine invented by chemist Angelo Mariani in the 1860s, which later spawned numerous imitators.
- Cordial: a sweetened alcohol-based concoction intended to be stimulating to the heart, often containing numerous herbs; some cordials are now sold non-medically as liqueurs.
- Elixir: similar to a cordial, an elixir was historically defined as a sweet liquid containing one or more active ingredients, taken as a medical remedy.
- Fruit salt: an effervescent compound made up of organic acids, salts, added flavoring, and sugar.
- Herbal tonic: a loosely defined category of traditional herbal medicines with various ingredients and intended purposes.
- Liniment: a topical medication, sometimes called a balm or heat rub, intended for application to the skin for the relief of pain and stiffness.
- Lithia water: mineral water characterized by the trace presence of lithium salts; popular in the United States between the 1880s and World War I.
- Panacea: patent medicines were often sold as panaceas, or universal cures.
- Snake oil: the archetypal quack remedy, cure-all medicines purportedly made of snake oil were so popular in the 19th century that the phrase is now used as a generic term for hoaxes of all kinds.
- Tincture: an extract of organic material dissolved in alcohol, tinctures are still used in modern herbal medicine.
- Vermifuge: before modern sanitation practices, intestinal parasite infections were common; a variety of worm lozenges, powders, and syrups, commonly including santonin, were sold as treatment.

== Notable brand names ==
=== Surviving brands and products ===
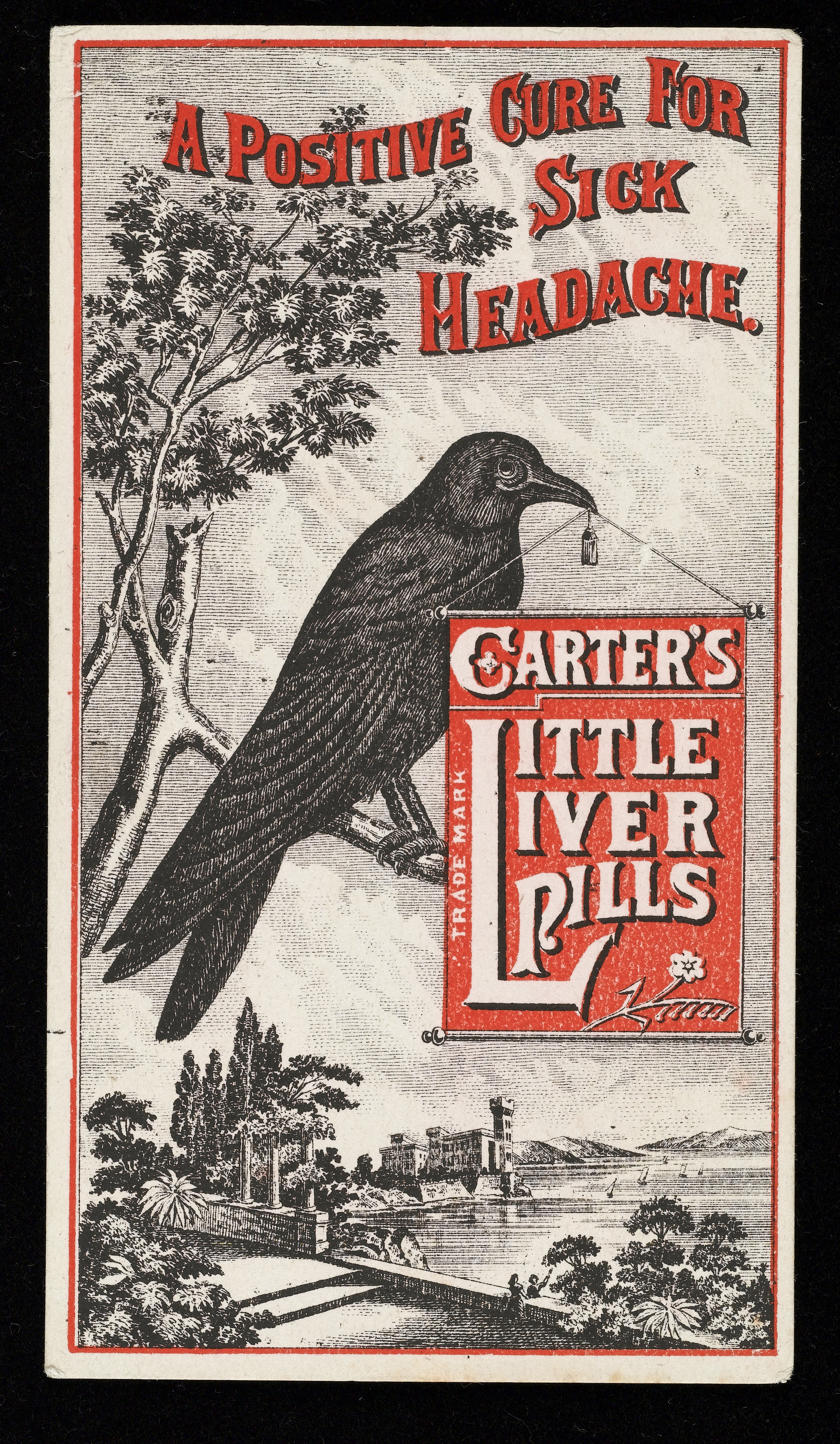
Early 20th-century advertisement

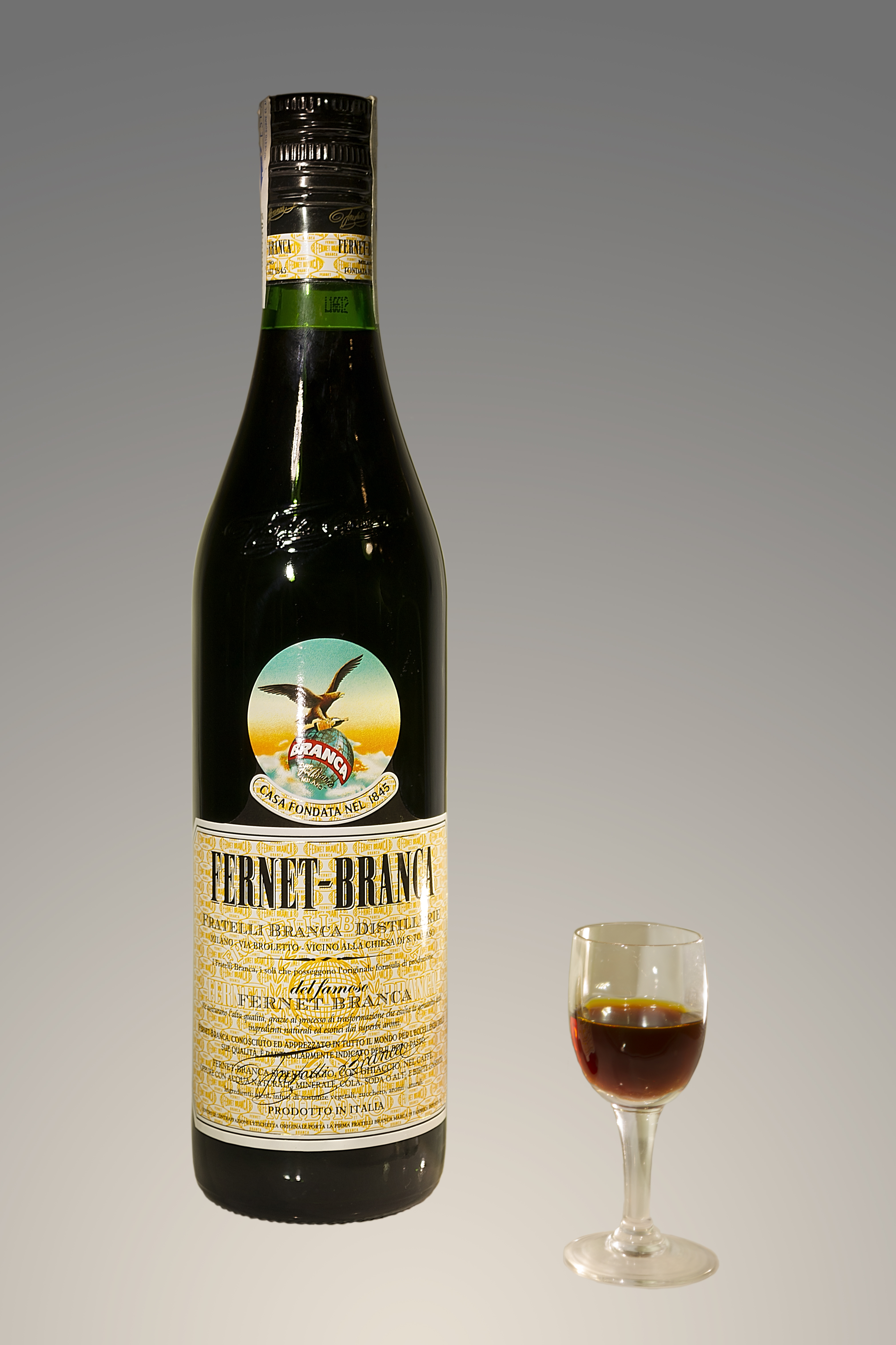
A bottle of Fernet-Branca herbal liqueur

Some brands from the patent medicine era have survived into the present day, typically with significantly revised formulas and toned-down advertising. Some are still sold as medicines, with more realistic claims and less harmful ingredients. Many others, particularly liquid preparations, have been revised into non-medical food or drink products such as soft drinks.

- 7 Up: this soft drink was at one point named "7Up Lithiated Lemon Soda" when it was formulated in 1929 because it claimed to contain lithium citrate. The beverage was a patent medicine marketed as a cure for hangover. In 1936 the federal government forced the manufacturer to remove a number of health claims, and because "lithium was not an actual ingredient", the name was changed to just "7 Up" in 1937. Many sources repeat an incorrect version of the story where the name started as "Bib-Label Lithiated Lemon-Lime Soda" and the removal happened in 1948 due to a Food and Drug Administration ban.
- Angostura bitters: originally marketed as a remedy for seasickness, angostura bitters are now used as a common cocktail ingredient.
- Black Draught: a mixture of saline aperient and blue mass prescribed as a purgative, historically popular with African Americans.
- Buckfast Tonic Wine: a caffeinated fortified wine originally marketed as a health tonic, now marketed simply as an alcoholic drink.
- Carter's Little Liver Pills: originally touted as a cure for headache, constipation, dyspepsia, and biliousness, now marketed as a basic laxative.
- Coca-Cola: originally marketed as a cure for ailments including morphine addiction and impotence; eventually reformulated as a soft drink without medicinal ingredients.
- Dr Pepper: early advertisements for this soft drink made medical claims, stating that it "aids digestion and restores vim, vigor, and vitality."
- Eno: a brand of fruit salt originally promoted as a cure-all; successfully rebranded in the 1950s as an antacid drug.
- Father John's Medicine: originally consisting of cod-liver oil and licorice root, this cough medicine was later reformulated to include dextromethorphan, and is still sold today.
- Fernet-Branca: this brand of amaro liqueur was originally promoted as a cure for overeating and hangovers, and remains a popular digestif.
- Fletcher's Laxative: originally sold as Pitcher's Castoria and later Fletcher's Castoria, it was reformulated to remove alcohol and is still sold as a children's laxative.
- Hires Root Beer: originally marketed with claims that it could "purify the blood and make rosy cheeks," it is now sold as a non-medicinal soft drink.
- Lithia: a brand of lithia water once advertised as a treatment for depression, alcoholism, and low libido, now sold without health claims.
- Mentholatum Ointment: introduced in 1894, early advertising focused on the perceived exoticism of menthol by calling it the "Great Japanese Salve Mentholatum".
- Minard's Liniment: although meant for external use, Minard's was sometimes taken internally in Newfoundland and Labrador as a home remedy for the common cold.
- Moxie: created around 1876 as a patent medicine called "Moxie Nerve Food," this is now a popular New England soft drink.
- Pepsi: this popular soft drink was first sold as a digestive aid, and takes its name from the Greek word for digestion.
- Sanatogen: sold in the 1920s as a remedy for depression, the brand name persists as a fortified wine, with a label warning that it "does not imply health-giving or medicinal properties."
- Smith Brothers Cough Drops: one of the first trademarked products in the United States, the brand disappeared in the 1970s, but was revived in 2016.
- Zam-Buk: introduced in 1902 with typically exaggerated claims, this ointment is still produced, and is considered a cultural staple in South Africa.

=== Discontinued products ===
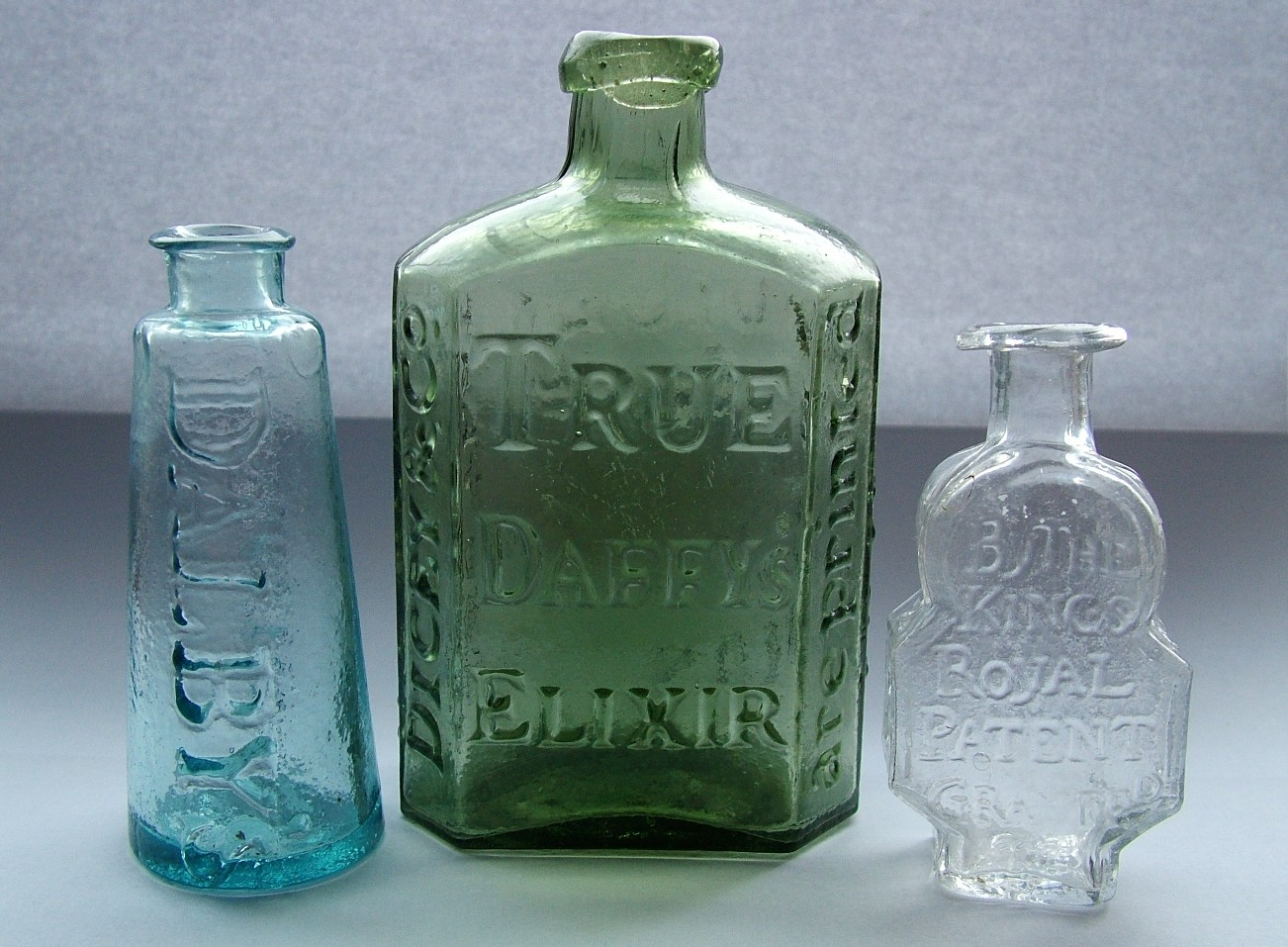
Antique bottles of Daffy's Elixir, Dalby's Carminative and Turlington's Balsam of Life

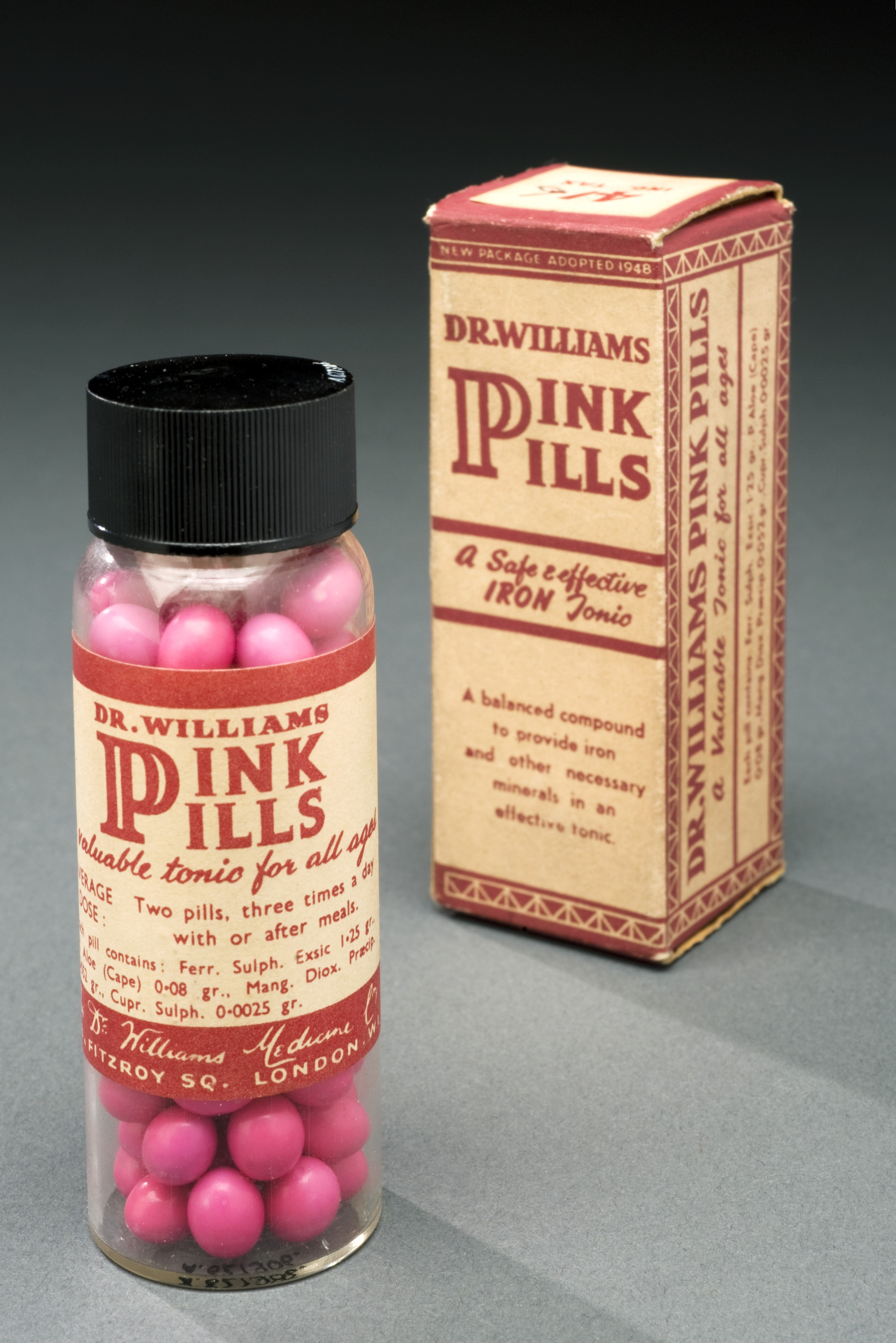
Dr. Williams' Pink Pills for Pale People

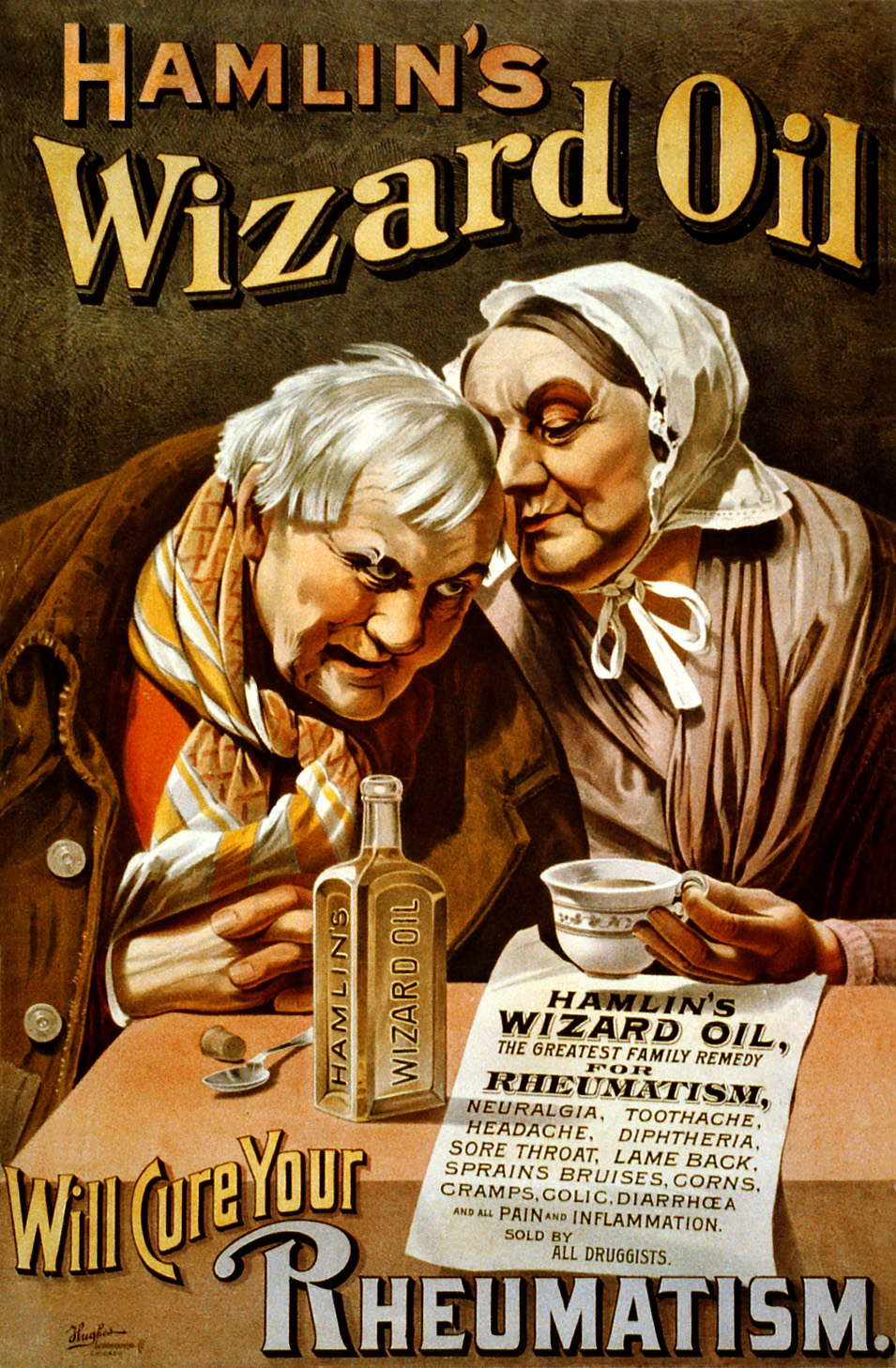
Advertising poster from about 1890

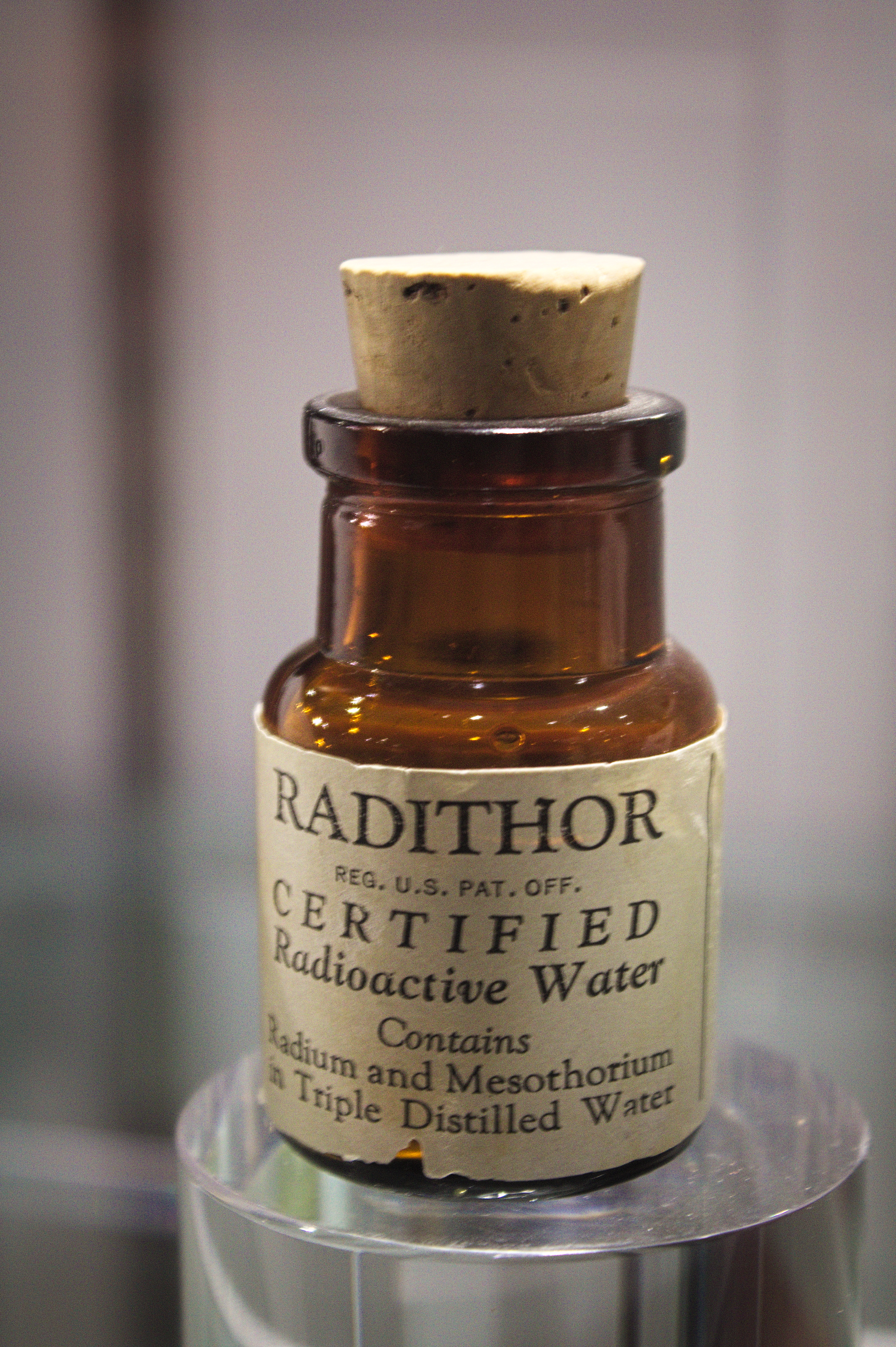
A bottle of Radithor at the National Museum of Nuclear Science & History

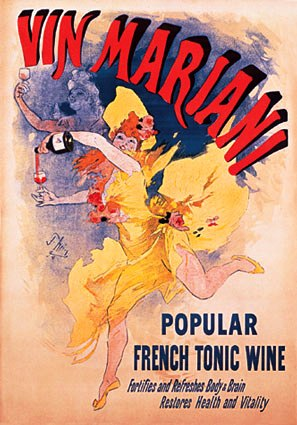
1894 advertisement poster for Vin Mariani, lithograph by Jules Chéret

- A.B.C. Liniment: named for its three primary ingredients, aconite, belladonna, and chloroform, the toxic formula caused numerous poisonings and at least one death.
- Água de Inglaterra: a name used for preparations using the bark of the cinchona tree, used to treat malaria in Portugal from the 17th to the 19th centuries.
- Antikamnia: supposed pain medication containing acetanilid, which caused several deaths, after which it was reformulated to use the less toxic derivative acetphentidin.
- Beecham's Pills: purportedly made of medicinal herbs; analysis by the British Medical Association in 1909 found they were made solely of aloe, ginger, and soap.
- Bile Beans: a laxative and tonic first marketed in the 1890s, supposedly able to "disperse unwanted fat" and "purify and enrich the blood".
- Buffalo Lithia Water: a brand of lithia water found to contain so little lithium that obtaining a therapeutic dose would require consuming at least 150,000 gallons daily.
- Chlorodyne: this combination of laudanum, tincture of cannabis, and chloroform was marketed as a cure-all, but frequently caused addiction and overdoses.
- Daffy's Elixir: a name used for multiple formulas sold as stomach remedies and cure-alls during the 18th and 19th centuries.
- Dalby's Carminative: this opium-based medicine was marketed for calming babies, but was condemned by physicians of the time as potentially fatal to infants.
- Dr. Bateman's Pectoral Drops: an opium solution sold during the 18th to 20th centuries as a remedy for chest and lung ailments.
- Dr. Morse's Indian Root Pills: production of these cure-all pills formed the backbone of the economy for Morristown, New York for much of the 20th century.
- Dr. Rush's Bilious Pills: laxatives containing more than 50% mercury, created by Benjamin Rush and famously taken on the Lewis and Clark Expedition of 1803–1806.
- Dr. Thomas' Eclectric Oil: the name of this cure-all is a portmanteau of "eclectic" and "electric", referencing the then-current theory that electricity had healing properties.
- Dr. Williams' Pink Pills for Pale People: these bright pink pills, largely composed of iron, were actually an effective treatment for anemia and chlorosis.
- Fowler's solution: an arsenical compound sold in the 19th century for various ailments including treatment of leukemia.
- Godbold's Vegetable Balsam: a mixture of sublimate of mercury, gum Arabic, honey, and syrup sold in the 18th and 19th centuries as a cure for syphilis.
- Godfrey's Cordial: called "Mother's Friend," this laudanum cordial was used to quiet infants, but frequently caused serious or even lethal opium poisoning.
- Green's August Flower: a tonic for indigestion often sold with the company's other major product, Dr. Boschee's Syrup, a purported cure for tuberculosis.
- Hadacol: marketed as a vitamin supplement in the United States during the 1940s and 1950s, it was primarily popular in dry counties for its alcohol content.
- Hamlin's Wizard Oil: a cure-all produced by former magician John Hamlin, popularly sold at gaudy medicine shows throughout the American Midwest in the 19th century.
- Jamaica ginger: popular during the era of alcohol prohibition in the United States as it was available as a medication, but contained approximately 70% to 80% ethanol by weight.
- Keyser's Pills: an 18th-century patent medicine containing mercuric oxide and acetic acid, used to treat syphilis.
- Lane's Emulsion: invented in New Zealand and promoted as a health tonic and a cure for tuberculosis.
- Londonderry Lithia: advertised as a cure-all, this brand of lithia water went out of business after government tests found it contained no more than trace amounts of lithium.
- Mrs. Moffat's Shoo-Fly Powders for Drunkenness: a supposed remedy for intoxication which in 1941 was the subject of one of the first court cases brought by the Food and Drug Administration of the United States.
- Mrs. Winslow's Soothing Syrup: a morphine syrup that remained on the market until 1930, despite claims as early as 1911 that it was potentially lethal to infants.
- Nine oils: a 19th-century preparation used on both horses and humans; druggists' books sometimes specified recipes, but quack cure salesmen often promoted any kind of oil as the "nine oils".
- Orvietan: this herbal concoction was used in the 17th and 18th centuries as a panacea against various types of poisoning and other maladies.
- Oxygenized air: a form of laughing gas promoted as a cure for various diseases of the respiratory tract.
- Pemberton's French Wine Coca: a coca wine invented by druggist John Stith Pemberton, the inventor of Coca-Cola.
- Peruna: sold as a cure for catarrh, this patent medicine was so popular that it became the namesake of the mascot of Southern Methodist University.
- Phospho-Energon: a Swedish preparation from the early 20th century whose main ingredients were calf's brain, sugar and milk.
- Radithor: American socialite Eben Byers died of radiation-induced cancer in 1932 after consuming this radioactive quack medicine.
- Sedna: an Irish port wine marketed as a health tonic, its original formula contained coca leaves, kola nuts, and beef extract.
- Sequah Medicine Company: this company toured England with a promotional medicine show featuring exaggerated depictions of cowboys and Native Americans.
- Seven Sutherland Sisters Hair Grower: a hair growth formula promoted by the Sutherland Sisters, famed for their own floor-length hair.
- Soliman's Water: a 16th-century facial peel made of mercury, sulfur, and turpentine; while effective in the short term, it could cause long-term damage like mercury poisoning.
- Soloman's Cordial Balm of Gilead: a famous and expensive remedy exposed as a fraud when its ingredients were discovered to be nothing more than French brandy infused with lemon peel and cardamom seeds.
- Swaim's Panacea: first sold by William Swaim in 1820, this popular remedy was composed of sarsaparilla syrup, oil of wintergreen, and corrosive sublimate of mercury.
- Tilden's Extract: a medicinal cannabis extract popularized by American author Fitz Hugh Ludlow in his 1857 book The Hasheesh Eater.
- Turlington's Balsam: English merchant Robert Turlington was granted a royal patent for this 27-ingredient preparation in 1744, making it one of the earliest patented medicines.
- Vin Mariani: the original coca wine, Vin Mariani was sold as a medicine and performance enhancer and endorsed by numerous celebrities, including Pope Leo XIII and Thomas Edison.
- Warburg's tincture: an efficacious but now-obsolete remedy for malaria, it was sometimes criticized as a quack remedy until the formula was released in 1875.

== See also ==
- Alternative medicine
- Chinese patent medicine
- Herbal medicine
- Medicine show
- Quackery
- List of topics characterized as pseudoscience
- List of unproven and disproven cancer treatments
