= Eno (drug) =

Brand of antacids

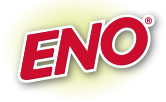

Eno is an over-the-counter antacid brand produced by Haleon. It is mostly composed of sodium carbonate, sodium bicarbonate and citric acid.

== History ==
Eno was first marketed by James Crossley Eno. Legend has it that his idea for the product arose while he was working at the pharmacy of an infirmary in Newcastle, Britain, with Dennis Embleton; Embleton often prescribed an effervescent drink made by mixing sodium bicarbonate and citric acid in water, and Eno adopted this beverage. In reality, Eno opened a pharmacy where he made the mixture in 1852, a year before Embleton came to work at the infirmary, and such fruit salt mixtures were common at the time.

== Marketing ==
Eno gave away his branded mixture to sea captains at the port, and in this way Eno's became a brand known around the world. By 1865 he had to move to a bigger facility, and he formally founded the company Eno's "Fruit Salt" Works in 1868. In 1878 Eno moved the business to Hatcham where the factory employed 50 people by 1884.

Eno was advertised heavily, as all patent medicines were at that time. In 1883 it was advertised as a cure for cholera and in 1892 for "keeping blood pure and free from disease", prevention of diarrhea, and many other conditions. By 1928 the company had factories in England, Canada, France, Germany, Spain, and the US; that year the company was acquired by International Proprietaries, a company that had been established by Canadian businessman Harold F. Ritchie. International Proprietaries was eventually renamed Eno, and in 1938 the business was bought by Beecham for its products as well as its international marketing force. As the pharmaceutical industry transitioned from selling cure-all patent medicines to selling drugs in the 1950s, Eno was one of a handful of products that were retained in the industry.
