= Rebecca J. Keck =

American physician

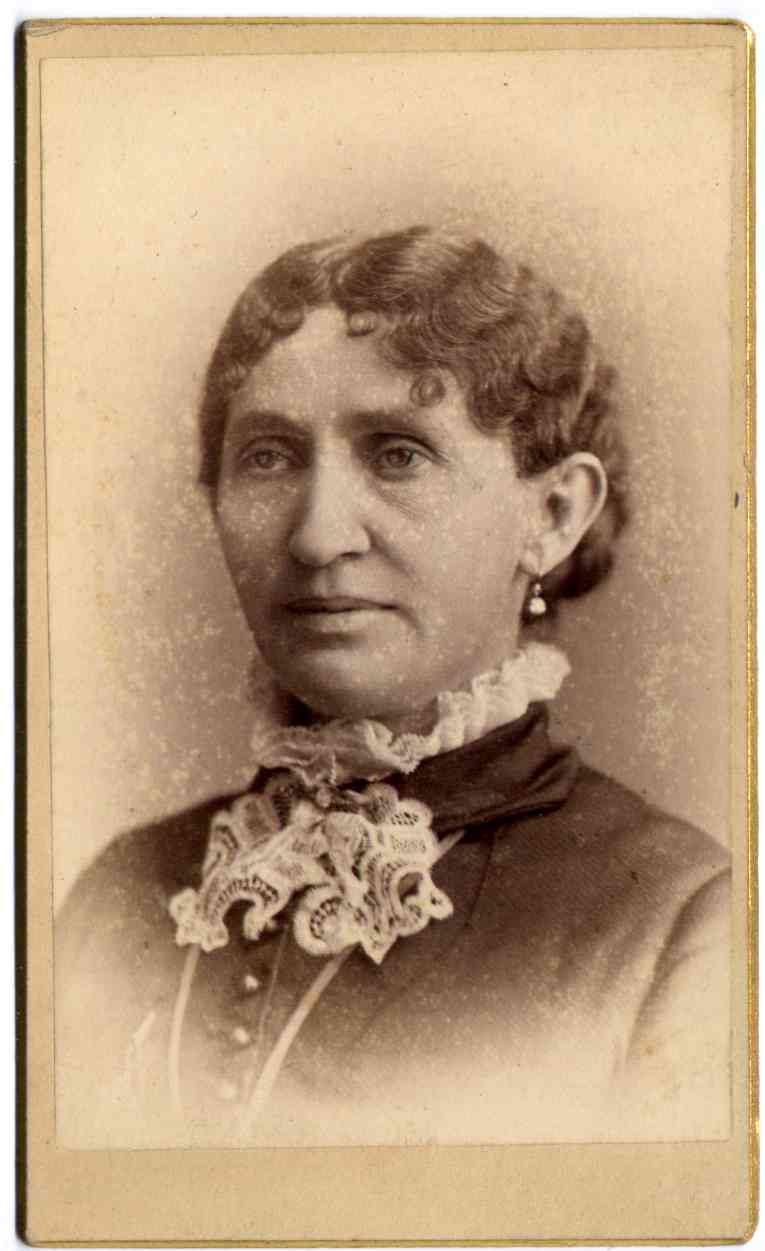
- Portrait of Rebecca Keck in Peoria, Illinois, c. 1880
- Born: Rebecca Ilgenfritz; 1838; Wooster, Ohio
- Died: 1904 (aged 65–66)
- Occupations: eclectic physician, patent medicine seller

Dr. Rebecca J. Keck (1838–1904) was an American eclectic physician and patent medicine seller who practiced in Illinois and Iowa. She was one of the wealthiest independent businesswomen in the Midwestern United States, and was a prominent opponent of medical industry regulation.

== Early life and education ==
The oldest daughter in a large Pennsylvania Dutch pioneer farming family, Rebecca Keck (née Ilgenfritz, sometimes spelled Ilginfritz) was born in Wooster, Wayne County, Ohio, in 1838. She moved with her parents to Fairfield, Iowa, at the age of thirteen, where she may have completed schooling as far as the eighth grade. In 1857, she married John Conrad Keck, a merchant and mechanic who had recently arrived in Fairfield from Northampton County, Pennsylvania.

Three of Rebecca's brothers died of tuberculosis between 1857 and 1869; while she was nursing them through their illnesses, she also gave birth to six children (five girls and a boy) and began to develop a reputation among her neighbors as an herbalist. During this time, her husband built up a substantial farm equipment and foundry business.

== Career ==
Following the national banking Panic of 1873, John Keck's foundry business collapsed and the couple began to collect herbs and brew her remedies together, which Rebecca Keck began selling door to door. She and her husband opened a patent medicine factory in the former foundry in Fairfield. Seeking a wider market, they took out their first advertisement for "Keck's Catarrhochesis" in Dubuque in November 1873. Within three years, she was advertising herself as a physician, and her "Catarrh Cure" heavily in a number of newspapers including the Dubuque Herald, the Davenport Gazette, the Chicago Times, and the Chicago Tribune.

Besides selling her remedies by mail order, Keck practiced as an "itinerant physician," a common business model for the frontier, because sick people were scattered across long distances and lacked regular access to medical care. She rented rooms in a local hotel or storefront for visits of two days to two weeks, taking out advertisements in advance to advise her customers of her upcoming personal consultations. She traveled her entire circuit every two months, so that patients could see her for follow-up treatment. At its height, her practice served between 12,000 and 15,000 patients, and she would typically see 350 patients per week.

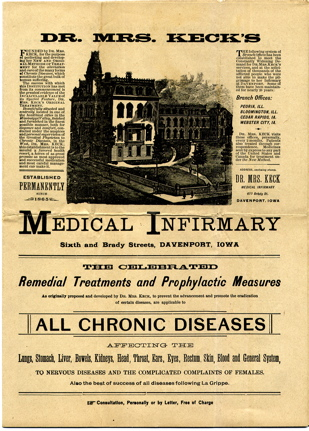
The first page of a four-page booklet describing Keck's medical services, published in 1894

In 1875, Mrs. Dr. Keck moved her family to Davenport, Iowa, as her business expanded. As was common for Midwestern women physicians in her day, she used the titles of both Dr. and Mrs. so that her married and professional status could both be understood by the public. She treated only chronic conditions, and according to the testimonial letters she published in her advertising, the majority of her customers were working people and farm families who could not afford the high cost of private doctors' fees and who received her medical remedies and treatment advice by mail order.

Keck likely considered herself to be a fully qualified physician by virtue of her long years of experience treating her family, neighbors and public customers. She owned a large medical library and advertised herself as an eclectic practitioner.

Though most eclectic medical schools were open to women by the 1870s, there is no evidence that Keck enrolled in any of them. It is likely that either she could not afford the time and money required to attend medical school (because of her six children and her family's bankruptcy in 1873) or she did not consider a professional degree to be necessary for her practice as a physician.

=== Fame grows ===
With the exception of Lydia Pinkham, Keck appears to be the only woman in 19th century America to have earned substantial wealth on her own behalf through the sale of patent medicine. Like Pinkham, Keck began her career because of family bankruptcy caused by the Panic of 1873. But unlike Pinkham, Keck not only considered herself a practicing physician, but became the top executive of her business, which she ran with the assistance of her two oldest daughters, Belle Alexander and Charlotte Dorn, while her husband played only a peripheral role and her only son contributed even less to the operations.

It is difficult to know Keck's exact income, but she was able to purchase her infirmary in 1879 for $12,000 in cash, and at the time of her death, her life insurance payout of $15,520 was one of the largest made in the United States for the week of May 17, 1905. She also sent her daughter Cora to Vassar College, one of the most expensive colleges in the country.

While unpopular with members of the medical establishment in Iowa and Illinois, Keck enjoyed glowing front-page editorial endorsements from newspapers in the cities where she practiced. Some newspapers ran her illustrated, full-column advertisements on the front page under the heading, "Mrs. Dr. Keck's Column." The Decatur Review declared on November 15, 1883, "We have a marked example among us of success in medicine, in the person of Mrs. Dr. Keck, well-known in the West," while the Bloomington Pantagraph declared on August 30, 1883, that Mrs. Dr. Keck "absorbs considerable public attention and is a subject for congratulation among the women of America…a forcible illustration of the ability of women to succeed" in "avenues of professional or public life." The Quincy Whig said she was "one of our longest established and best known physicians," while the Evening Peorian referred to her "celebrity as a physician and good name as a citizen." The Peoria National Democrat declared, "her success is unprecedented…she is capable of doing the work of five ordinary women."

Members of the medical establishment disagreed. The secretary of the Illinois State Board of Health, Dr. John Rauch, was quoted in the Chicago Tribune as saying that Keck was "foul and damnable in every way," and other members of county medical associations held similar opinions. Dr. James Clarke of Fairfield wrote that the sale of her catarrh cures "made the doctor wealthy, even if it did not cure her patients." Regular doctors universally dismissed her as a quack, and her name was excluded from the physicians and surgeons listing in the Davenport business directories every year after 1878, although Keck continued to describe herself as a specialist and physician in the regular alphabetical listings and bought the entire back cover of the 1882 edition to advertise her infirmary.

=== Legal reform ===
The state of Illinois passed the Medical Practices Act in 1877 in an effort to regulate the medical profession in the state. This Illinois law was a landmark in health law in the United States, leading the way towards improved standards for medical licensing and medical education in the country. The act defined requirements for a physician's license that excluded thousands of untrained physicians from the state during the first year after it was passed. Popular opposition to this measure was strong, with some citizens arguing that the law was "an opening wedge for socialized medicine" in the state.

After the passing of the Medical Practices Act in Illinois, Keck continued treating her patients there and quickly emerged as an opponent to the state's legal reform effort. Keck became engaged in a highly publicized, adversarial relationship with the secretary of the new Illinois State Board of Health, Dr. John H. Rauch, that lasted for at least a decade. When local doctors tried to prevent Keck from practicing in McLean County, Illinois in early 1878, the Bloomington Daily Leader called her case the first test of the new legislation, "the beginning of a long and tedious litigation" between the "regulars" and the "irregulars." The lasting stigma of this discourse may have contributed to her fading from public view after her death, and her career remains little known today.

Criminal charges of practicing medicine without a license were brought against Keck in at least five different counties in Illinois between 1878 and 1889, against which she was defended by her lawyer Winfield S. Coy. During this time, Keck continued her business in McLean, Logan, Champaign, Peoria and Adams counties in Illinois for twenty years. Medical legislation in Iowa had even less effect on her business, and she opened Mrs. Dr. Keck's Infirmary for All Chronic Diseases in Davenport in 1879, practicing with uninterrupted financial success there and in Cedar Rapids, Dubuque and rural communities in Iowa until she retired in 1900.

=== Accusations of quackery ===
Over the years, Keck grew increasingly boastful of her ability to cure many types of chronic diseases, including tuberculosis, an obviously impossible task in an era before the Bacillus that caused the disease had been identified. Patients wrote to Keck when they were cured of chronic lung infections, piles, eczema, general debility, deafness and a host of other issues, and she published their testimonial letters in her advertisements.,

Fraudulent testimonial letters were a common feature of 19th century patent medicine advertising. Nevertheless, United States census records from 1880 show that many of the individuals whose testimonials appeared in Keck's advertisements were real people. However, in over a thousand ads that survive to be studied today, less than a hundred individuals are named, and there is no way to verify the facts presented about their illnesses, particularly the accuracy of the diagnoses, and there is no way to verify the percentage of Keck's patients who were cured by her treatments.

Standard allopathic medical practice during the 1870s and 1880s often involved "heroic" treatments with harsh, mineral medications containing lead, mercury (calomel) and arsenic, as well as toxic vegetable compounds containing strychnine, castor oil (derived from ricin), belladonna and other poisonous substances. Clumsy, unsanitary surgical procedures were also common, so it is possible that Keck's herbal tonics and nursing advice may have been better for her patients than the regular doctors' remedies in some cases.

While a number of unlicensed physicians were sued for medical malpractice in Davenport during the years she practiced, no such accusation against Keck appears in the public record.

The only parties who sued Keck during her career were male doctors with medical degrees who sought either to prevent her from obtaining a medical license or to prevent her from practicing medicine without one. No evidence that she harmed a patient was ever produced in any of these cases.

== Bibliography ==
- Beatty, William K. M.D. (1991) "John H. Rauch—Public Health, Parks and Politics" in The Proceedings of the Institute of Medicine of Chicago Volume 44
- Bres, Rose Falls (1918) Maids, wives and widows: the law of the land and of the various states as it affects women. New York: E.P. Dutton & Co.
- Clarke, James Frederic, M.D. F.A.C.S. (Dec. 1934 to Dec. 1935) "A History of Medicine in Jefferson County Iowa," The Journal of the Iowa State Medical Society (published serially)
- Ehrenreich, Barbara and Deirdre English (1973 and 2010) Witches, Midwives & Nurses The Feminist Press at the City University of New York
- Lawrence, Susan C. (2003) "Iowa Physicians: Legitimacy, Institutions, and the Practice of Medicine, Part One: Establishing a Professional Identity, 1833-1886" The Annals of Iowa 62 (Spring 2003) The State Historical Society of Iowa
- More, Ellen (1990) Restoring the Balance: Women Physicians and the Profession of Medicine 1850-1995 Harvard University Press
- Sandvick, Clinton (2009) "Enforcing Medical Licensing in Illinois: 1877-1890" Yale Journal of Biology and Medicine June 2009; 82(2) pp. 67–74
- Shryock, Richard H. (1960) Medicine and Society in America: 1660-1860 Cornell University Press
- Stage, Sarah (1979) Female Complaints: Lydia Pinkham and the Business of Women's Medicine W.W. Norton & Co.
- Starr, Paul (1982) The Social Transformation of American Medicine Basic Books
- Wilson, Jennie Lansley (1894) Legal Status of Women in Iowa Des Moines, Iowa: Iowa Printing Company
- Young, James Harvey (1961) The Toadstool Millionaires: A Social History of Patent Medicines in America before Federal Regulation Princeton, NJ: The Princeton University Press
