= James Ballard =

James Ballard may refer to:

- J. G. Ballard (1930–2009), English novelist, short story writer and essayist
- James F. Ballard (1851–1931), American entrepreneur and art collector
- Jim Ballard (born 1972), American football player
- Jim Ballard (swimmer), see 1977 Summer Universiade

== See also ==
- Samuel James Ballard (1765–1829), Vice-Admiral in the Royal Navy
