= Nathaniel Hone =

Nathaniel Hone may refer to:

- Nathaniel Hone the Elder (1718–1784), Irish painter
- Nathaniel Hone the Younger (1831–1917), Irish painter
- Nathaniel Hone (cricketer) (1861–1881), Irish cricketer
