= Patented Medicine Prices Review Board =

Canadian regulatory agency

- Conseil d'examen du prix des médicaments brevetés

Agency overview
- Formed: 1987; 39 years ago
- Jurisdiction: Canada
- Headquarters: Ottawa
- Employees: 74
- Annual budget: CA$10.3 million
- Minister responsible: Marjorie Michel, Minister of Health
- Agency executives: Tom Digby, Chairperson; Anie Perrault, Vice-Chairperson; Guillaume Couillard, Executive Director
- Key document: Patent Act
- Website: www.canada.ca/en/patented-medicine-prices-review.html

The Patented Medicine Prices Review Board (PMPRB; French: Conseil d'examen du prix des médicaments brevetés) is a federal quasi-judicial regulatory and reporting agency in Canada.

The mandate of the agency is to protect consumers by ensuring that the prices of patented medication charged by manufacturers are not excessive. The board also reports on trends, research and development in the Canadian pharmaceutical industry.

The PMRPB investigates, reviews and negotiates the price of drugs that are still under patent and which have no generic substitutes. It establishes the maximum prices that can be charged in Canada.

== Accountability ==
The board is accountable to the Parliament of Canada through the Minister of Health, the elected official responsible for the health portfolio. Under sections 89 and 100 of the Patent Act, the board produces an annual report submitted to the minister, who tables it in the House of Commons.

== Background ==
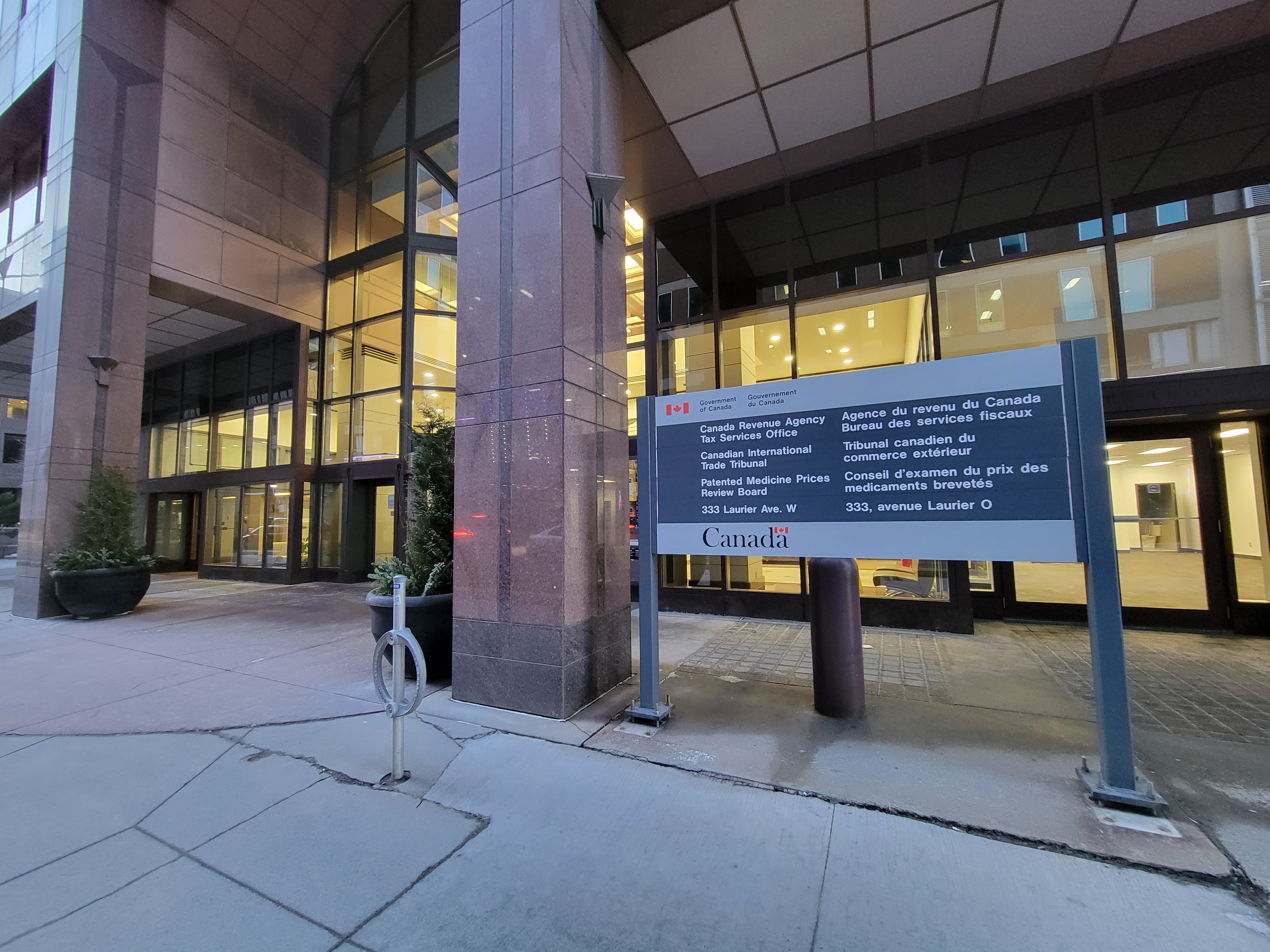
Patented Medicine Prices Review Board office in Ottawa

Bill C-22, which was passed in 1987, established a compulsory licensing system under which drug patent holders were required to allow competing drug manufacturers to import their patented drug in exchange for a very modest 4% royalty, which resulted in an increase in the market share of generic drugs. At the same time, it established the federal Patented Medicine Prices Review Board. The board determines a maximum price for individual drugs through a review process, and negotiates "voluntary compliance agreements" with drug companies to ensure that "manufacturer prices are within justification, and [are] not excessive".

The PMPRB is an independent federal quasi-judicial body established through Section 91 of the Patent Act. Sections 79 through to 103 of the Act set out the mandate, structure, appointment process, and jurisdiction of the Board. The objective of the board is to preventing manufacturers of patented medicines from charging excessive prices.

== Annual reports ==
According to their annual report for the fiscal year 2017, there were 1,391 patented medicines for human use that were reported, which included 80 new medicines. By December 31, 2017, there were 14 voluntary compliance undertakings accepted. Patented medicines represented 61.5% of the total medicine sales in Canada in 2017 up from 60.8% in 2016.

== Recent PMPRB reforms ==
Since 2017, the federal government has been working on passing regulatory changes to how the Patented Medicine Prices Review Board (PMPRB) regulates the excessive pricing of patented medicines in Canada. The Federal Court and Quebec Court of Appeal decisions in Innovative Medicines Canada v. Canada (2022) and Merck Canada inc. v Procureur général du Canada (2022) rebuked the federal government's initially proposed changes to the PMPRB as ultra vires the Patent Act. The Trudeau Liberal government has proceeded with subsequent regulatory changes designed to reduce the prices Canadian drug insurers pay for patented medicines. The government has been criticized for their use of the Patent Act and the Patented Medicine Prices Review Board to drive cost savings for drug insurers and for the potential cooling effect this may have in bringing innovative medicines to Canada 22.
