= Nathaniel Hone (cricketer) =

Irish cricketer

Personal information
- Full name: Nathaniel Thomas Hone
- Born: 21 June 1861; Monkstown, Dublin, Ireland
- Died: 1 August 1881 (aged 20); Limerick, Ireland
- Batting: Right-handed
- Role: Wicket-keeper

Domestic team information
- Years: Team
- 1881: Cambridge University

Career statistics
Competition	First-class
Matches	3
Runs scored	2
Batting average	1.00
100s/50s	–/–
Top score	1
Catches/stumpings	6/2
- Source: Cricinfo, 2 January 2022

Nathaniel Thomas Hone (21 June 1861 in Monkstown, Dublin, Ireland – 1 August 1881 in Limerick, Ireland) was an Irish cricketer who played first-class cricket for Cambridge University.

Born in Monkstown, Dublin and educated in Dublin and at Rugby where he was an excellent horse rider and polo player, he went on to attend Trinity Hall, Cambridge. Whilst there, he played three first-class cricket matches in June 1881, playing against Lancashire and the MCC before gaining his blue against Oxford University.

However, his life would end in tragic circumstances just five weeks later. Whilst on a cricket tour of Limerick, he was feeling unwell and went into a chemist to ask for a black draught. By mistake, the assistant gave him a dose of carbolic acid and he died in great pain a few hours later.
