= Swaim's Panacea =

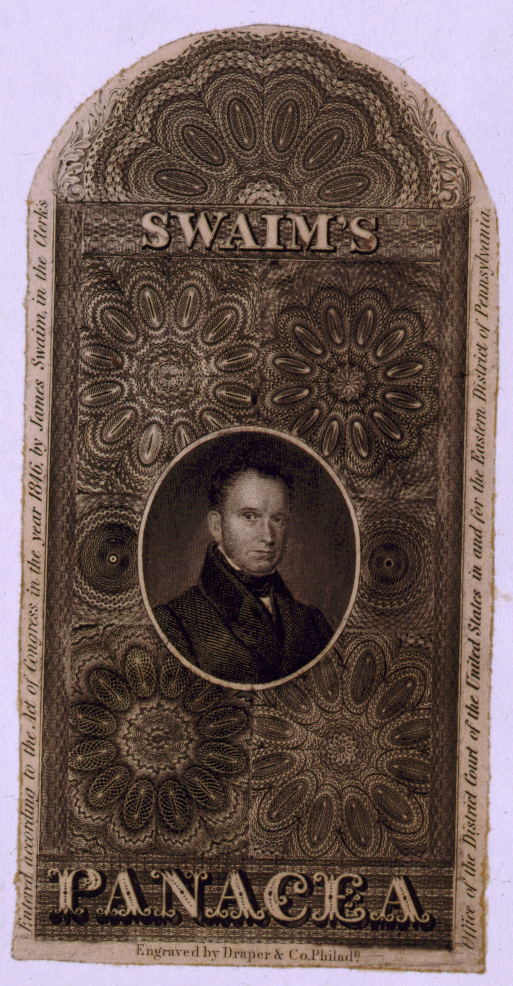
Swaim's Panacea bottle label c. 1846. Portrait is most likely William Swaim, though some modern sources identify as Swaim's son

Swaim's Panacea (also called Swaim's Celebrated Panacea) was an American patent medicine sold by William Swaim (1781–1846) of Philadelphia, starting in approximately 1820, with formulations still being sold into the 1920s. It was advertised to cure various diseases including scrofula, syphilis and rheumatism.

== History ==
Swaim was originally a bookbinder, and the popular story went that he discovered the recipe on the page of a book he was binding at his New York shop. More likely he obtained the recipe from Dr. N.J. Quackinboss who had administered it to Swaim himself. Quackinboss was using a formulation previously published by a Dr. McNeven which originated from France, where a remedy called the "Rob de Laffecteur" invented by the French apothecary Pierre Boyveau was very popular.

Swaim moved to Philadelphia and began to market his own version of the cure, at least by 1820, and perhaps as early as 1811. After getting permission to administer his concoction to some local asylum residents to alleged beneficial effect (and gathering numerous endorsements, including from local physicians), he was able to sell his product at high prices ($3 a bottle, a significant sum at the time), and became very wealthy with a net worth of approximately $500,000.

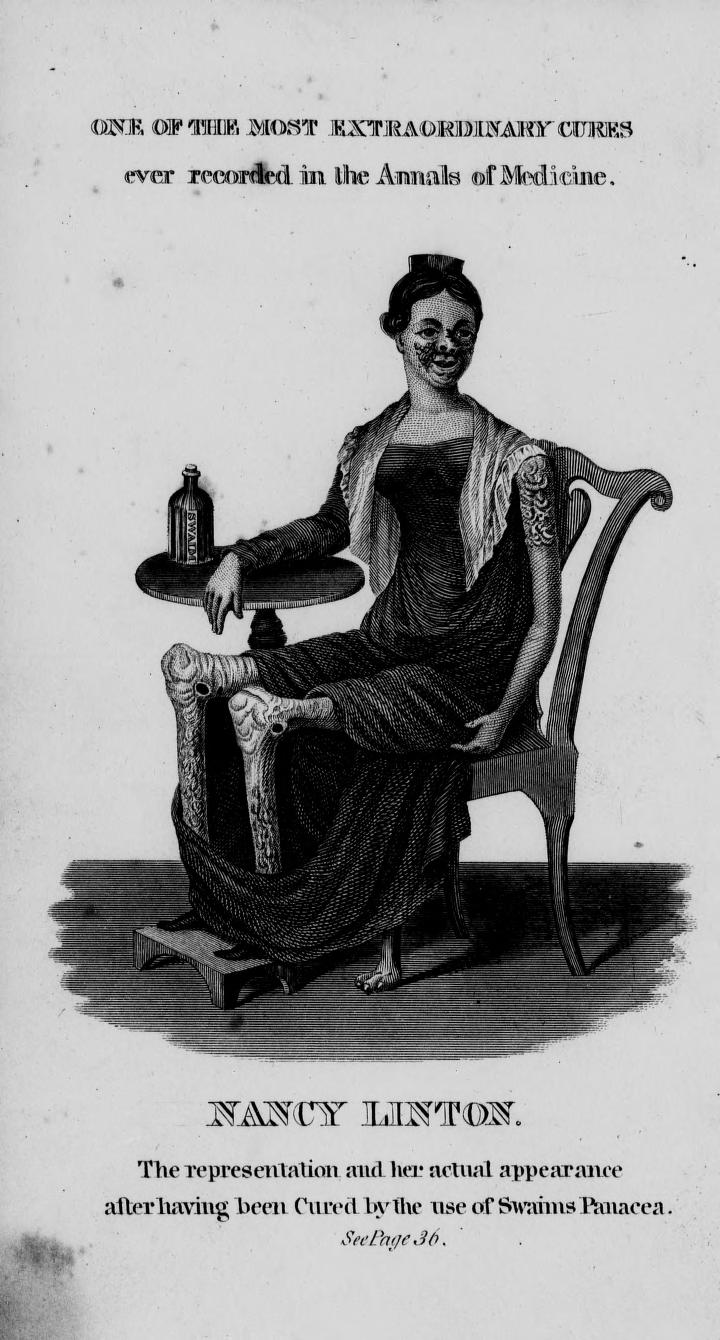
Nancy Linton, whom Swaim heavily advertised as cured by his Panacea.

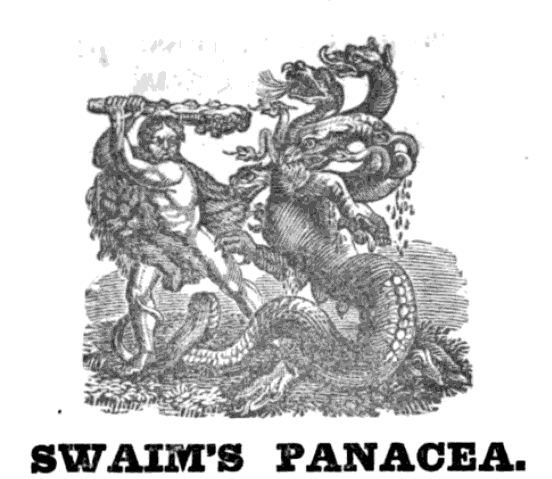
Detail of 1822 advertisement, showing Hercules battling the Hydra.

Swaim used a symbol of Hercules killing the Hydra in early advertisements of his product, which was being sold in rectangular bottles by 1825, and in green cylindrical bottles by 1829. Swaim advertised heavily, and took advantage of developments in commercial lithography in the 1830s to advertise his concoction with a portrait of a woman named Nancy Linton, advertising her "actual appearance" after being cured. The panacea contained the undisclosed active ingredient mercury dichloride, as Linton's grotesque appearance appears to reflect signs of mercury poisoning. Mercury dichloride (called corrosive sublimate at the time) did have a prior history of being used to treat syphilis. Oil of wintergreen and sarsaparilla were also prominent ingredients of Swaim's product.

By 1828, the Philadelphia Medical Society published a report strongly refuting previous endorsements of the popular panacea, as had the New York Medical Society. Respected physicians who had endorsed the product as promising in the beginning, such as Nathaniel Chapman who later founded the American Medical Association, disavowed their early approvals. Despite Swaim's claim that the product contained no mercury compounds, the medical reports of mercury toxicity showed otherwise.

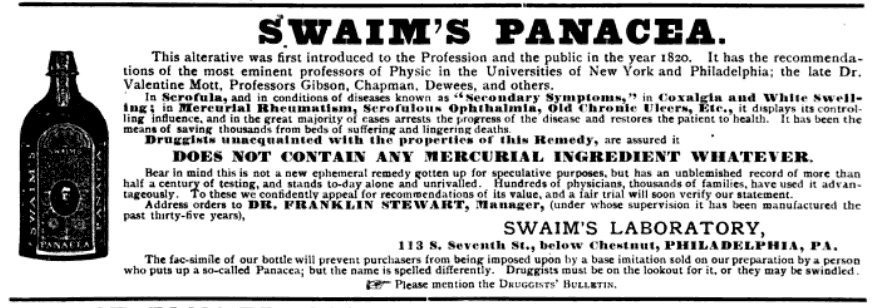
1890 advertisement for the Panacea in a pharmacy publication.

After William Swaim died in 1846, his son James continued the business until his death in 1870, along with Franklin Stewart, a Philadelphia physician and Swaim's "Medical Director". (Stewart's son Samuel Swaim Stewart invented the Banjeaurine.) "Swaim's Laboratory" was located in Philadelphia at 113 S. Seventh St, just below Chestnut for many years. Sometime after 1890, production was moved to Clifton, Staten Island in New York.

In 1900, James F. Ballard of St. Louis, who produced a number of patent medicines, acquired the rights to Swaim's Panacea and all other Swaim products from the Swaim family. In the 1910s, the United States government fined Ballard $30 for misbranding of products under the Pure Food and Drug Act of 1906, including Swaim's Panacea, as he was continuing to advertise the product with the amazing claims that had then been made for over 90 years. It appears the product continued to be sold at least into the 1920s.

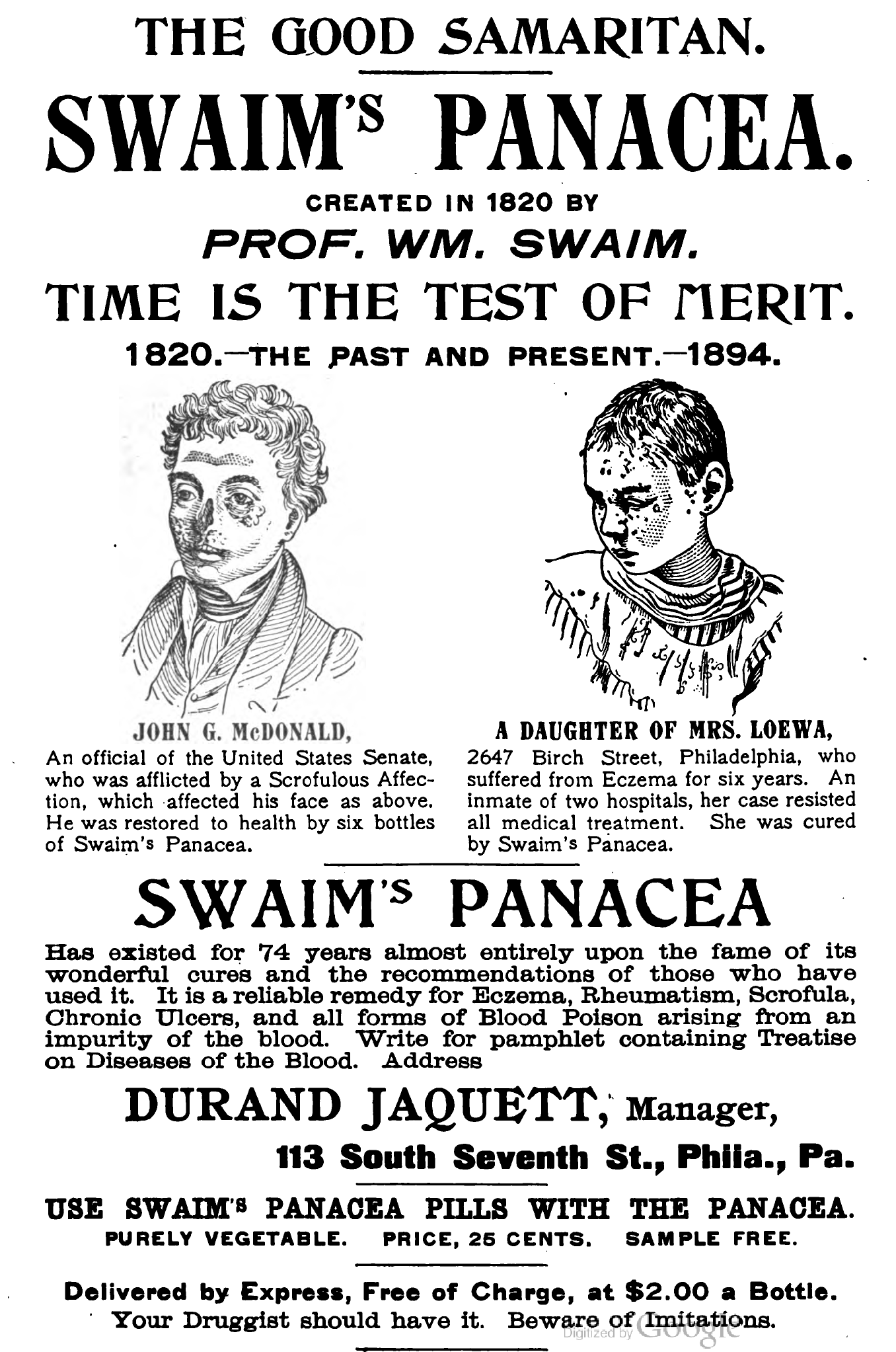
1894 advertisement in the Philadelphia Record Almanac.

== Copycats ==
The success of Swaim's Panacea generated a number of copycat products, including "Swayne's Panacea", "Swinn's Panacea", and "Parker's Renovating Vegetable Panacea," the last of which claimed a lineage older than Swaim and used an image of Hercules having already killed the Hydra in its advertising. The Swaims cautioned purchasers to avoid knock-offs, and to look for the distinguishing features of their bottles and labeling.

== Swaim's Panacea in popular culture ==
The popularity of the Panacea is reflected in publications of its time. For example, the product was mentioned in the song The Connecticut Pedlar (c. 1851), where the pedlar's list of offerings includes "Swaim's panacea and Jonses's drops too." And in an 1849 letter to the Southern Literary Messenger, Edgar Allan Poe defended the poetry of Bayard Taylor against critics "who possess little other ability than that which assures temporary success to them in common with Swaim's Panacea or Morrison's Pills." Abolitionist William Lloyd Garrison mentions "taking my third bottle of Swaim's Panacea" for scrofula in an 1836 letter.

One of the most comprehensive accounts of the story of Swaim's Panacea is in the 1961 book The Toadstool Millionaires: A Social History of Patent Medicines in America before Federal Regulation by James Harvey Young.

== See also ==
- List of topics characterized as pseudoscience
