= Keyser's Pills =

18th century patent medicine used to treat syphilis

Keyser's Pills were an 18th-century patent medicine used to treat syphilis. It contained a significant amount of mercury in the form of mercuric oxide and acetic acid. Marketed by a French military doctor Jean Keyser, these pills became a standard, albeit controversial, treatment for the venereal disease in various parts of Europe and the American colonies. Keyser's Pills often led to severe adverse reactions, including intense gastrointestinal distress and mouth ulcers, causing them to fall out of favor within a few years.

== History ==
Keyser's Pills were introduced in mid-18th century by a French military doctor Jean Keyser. It was swiftly adopted by French military medical services in the 1750s as a treatment for syphilis, and also appeared in the other European countries and American colonies during the 1760s and 1770s. It was later marketed in civilian apothecaries, featuring print advertising techniques to assert legitimacy. Simon-Nicholas Henri Linguet's French novel La Cacomonade also referenced the "dragées de Keyser".

== Composition ==
Keyser's Pills contained a combination of mercuric oxide and acetic acid. Mercury was a long-established, albeit toxic, treatment for syphilis throughout this historical period. The specific formulation by Keyser, incorporating acetic acid with mercury, aimed to mitigate some of the severe adverse effects commonly associated with traditional mercury-based syphilis treatments. As with most mercurial treatments, the pills acted by denaturing bacterial proteins, but also had high human toxicity.

== Usage and side effects ==
A trial of four women at Bicêtre Hospital caused colic, diarrhea, fevers, nausea and vomiting, and mouth ulcers to the level of gangrene, and one subject miscarried. A clinical trial of the pills was performed in Geneva in 1761 and deemed successful, which led the pills to be a considered a good treatment for some time, though not without continuing controversy and debate. However, reports of serious side effects led to withdrawal from routine use within a few years. English physician John Pringe cautioned biographer James Boswell against taking the pills for his venereal disease.

== See also ==
- Swaim's Panacea
