= James Crossley Eno =

British pharmacist (1827–1915)

- Born: 1827; Newcastle upon Tyne, Northumberland, England, United Kingdom
- Died: 11 May 1915 (aged 88); London, England, United Kingdom
- Occupations: Pharmacist, company founder

James Crossley Eno (1827 – 11 May 1915) was a British pharmacist known for compounding and selling a brand of fruit salt that is still popular today as an antacid.

== Biography ==
James Crossley Eno was born in Newcastle upon Tyne, England, the son of James Eno and Elizabeth Eno, who kept a small general shop. He apprenticed as a druggist and, at the end of his apprenticeship in 1846, joined the staff of a local infirmary as dispenser of prescriptions.

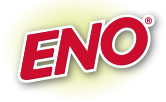
Eno Logo

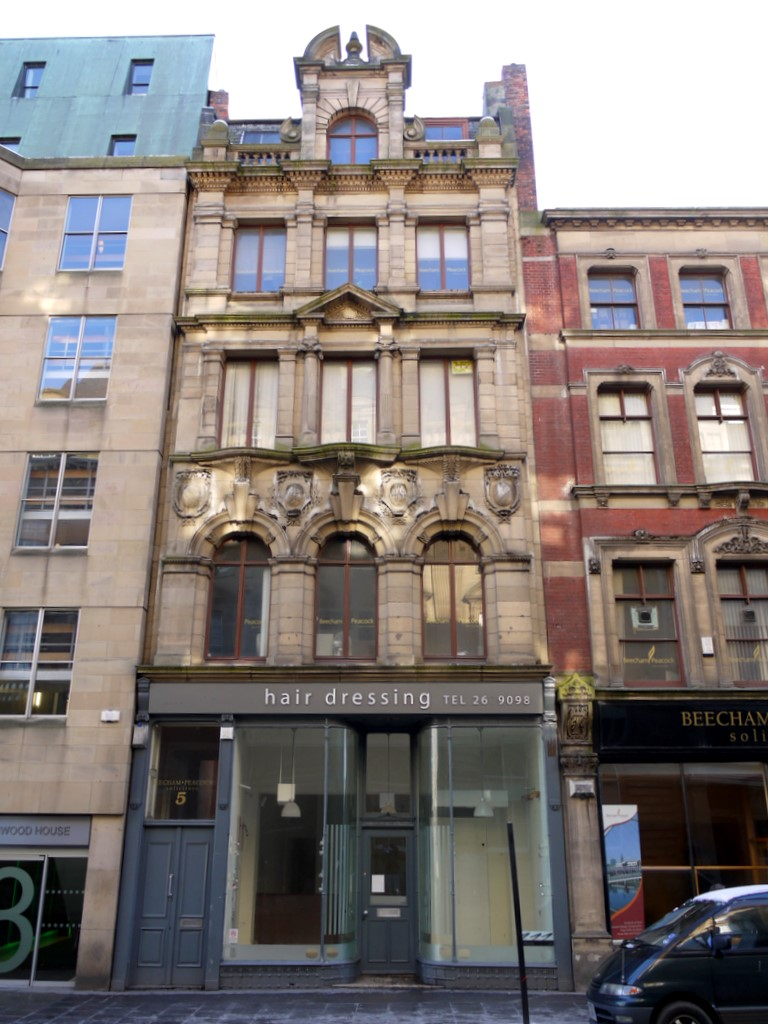
Building constructed for Eno in 1898 in Newcastle upon Tyne

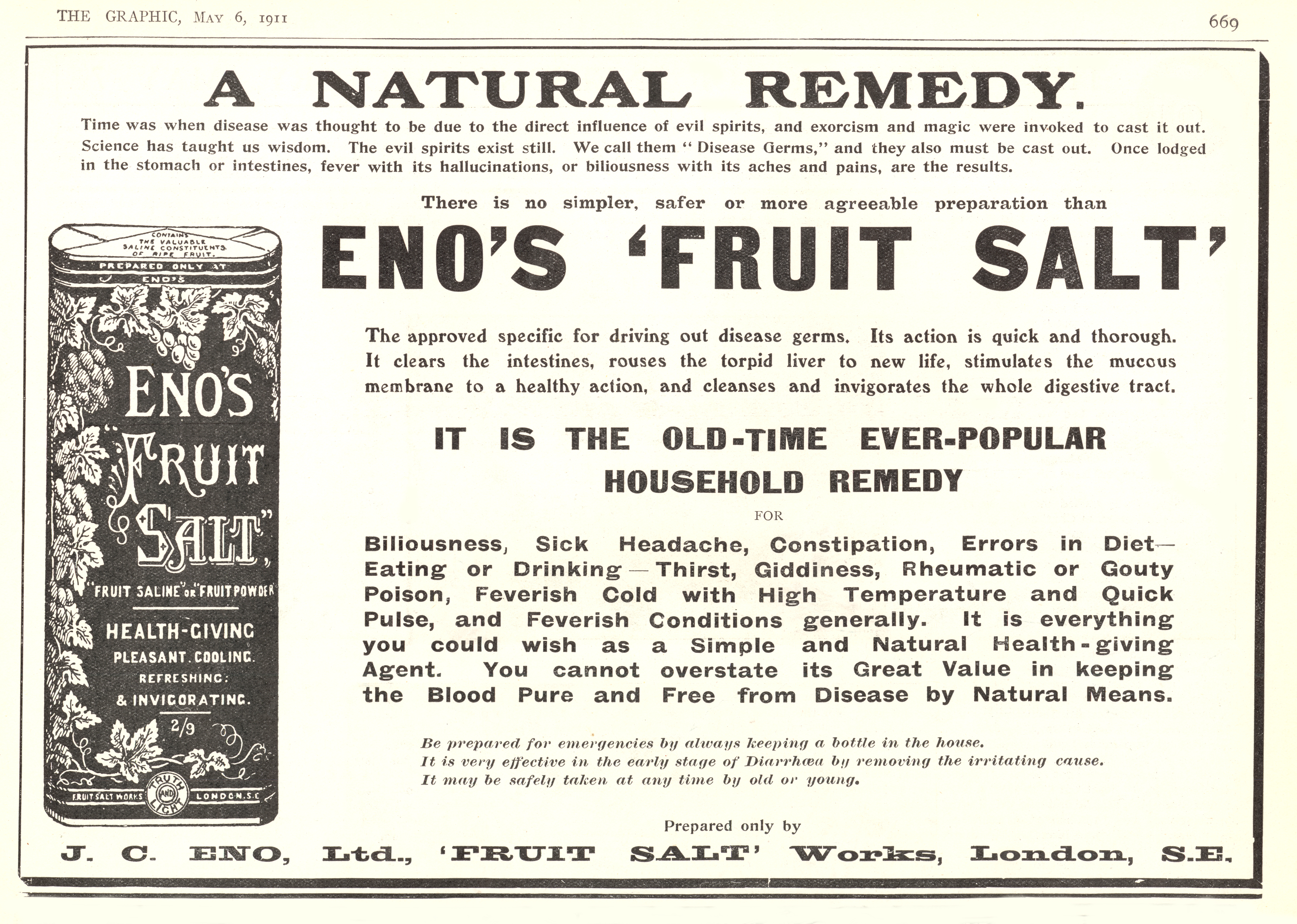
Eno's 'Fruit Salt' advertisement

At some point he met the Newcastle physician Dennis Embleton, who often prescribed an effervescent compound of sodium bicarbonate and citric acid. Mixtures of this type, combining a fruit acid with a carbonate or tartrate, were known as fruit salts, and they were marketed for a wide range of ailments, only a few of which (e.g. indigestion) they could actually ameliorate. Eno set up his own pharmacy in the Groat Market area of the city and in 1852 began selling his own fruit salt mixture. Eno gave away his compound to seafarers at the port, and in this way the name Eno became associated with fruit salts around the world. In 1868, he formally founded the company Eno's "Fruit Salt" Works.

With the success of his product, Eno's business outgrew its premises and in 1876 he established a larger factory in the New Cross district of London. He himself eventually settled in Dulwich. Eno died in 1915 in London at the age of 87.

Eno's success spawned many competitors in both Great Britain and the United States, but Eno's Fruit Salt continued to be popular. As the pharmaceutical industry moved away from cure-all patent medicines in the mid 20th century, Eno's Fruit Salt became one of the few surviving products of its kind. Currently owned by GlaxoSmithKline, Eno's Fruit Salt is today sold as an antacid, and its main ingredients are now sodium bicarbonate, sodium carbonate, and citric acid. Its main market is in India.

== Personal life ==
Eno married Elizabeth Ann Cooke in 1852 and they had a daughter, Amy (1855–1942). Amy married Harold William Swithinbank (1858–1928). Eno's family has remained prominent; his granddaughter, Dame Isobel Cripps, Lady Cripps (1891–1979), was an overseas aid organizer, his great-granddaughter, Peggy Cripps Appiah, was a children's book author, and his great-great-grandson, Kwame Anthony Appiah, is a professor of philosophy at New York University. He was not related to the musician Brian Eno.

== Legacy ==
A ward in the Royal Victoria Infirmary, Newcastle upon Tyne, was known for a time as the J. C. Eno Ward.
