= Godbold's Vegetable Balsam =

Patent medicine

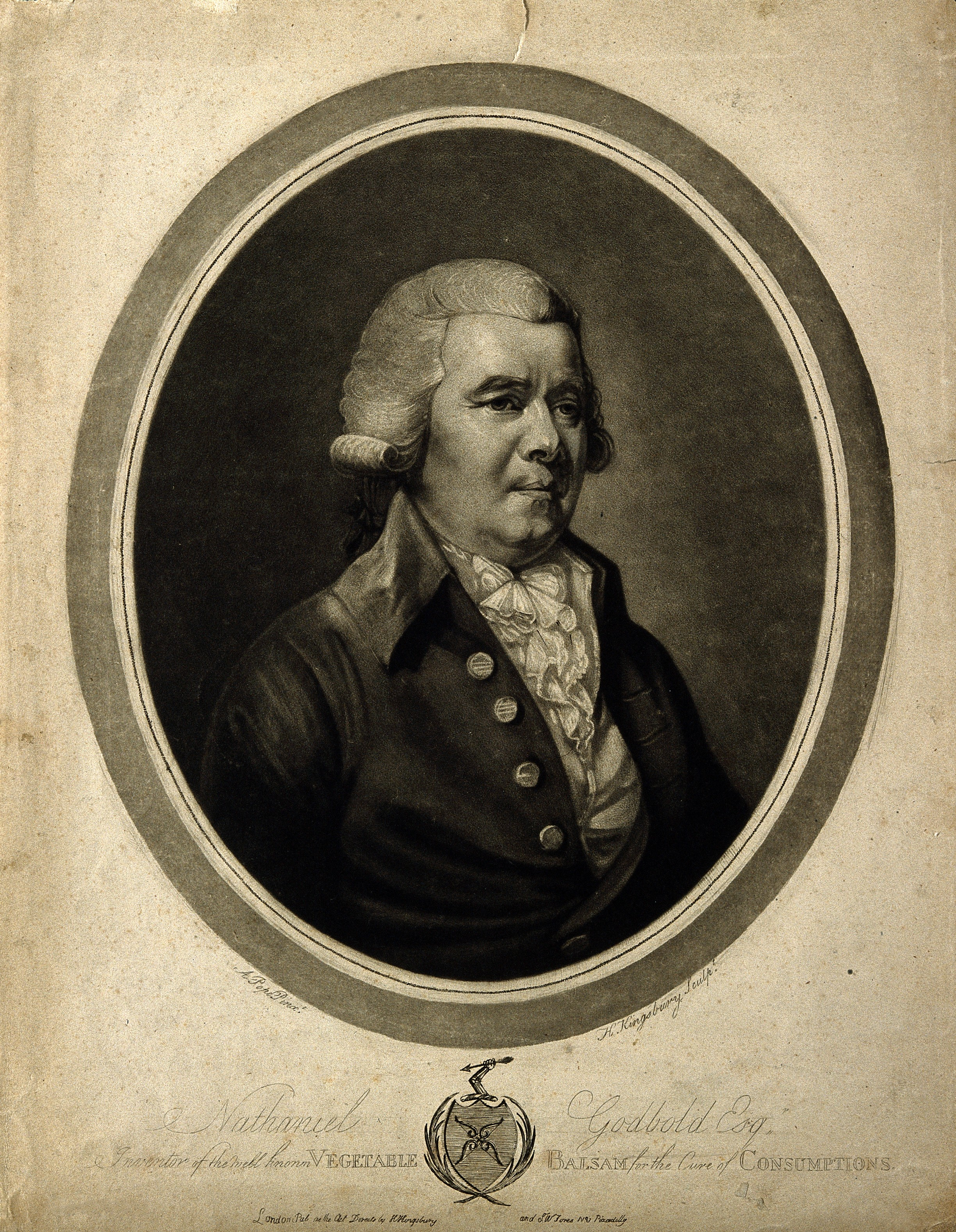
Portrait of Nathaniel Godbold, with caption "Nathaniel Gobold, Esq.; Inventor of the well known VEGETABLE BALSAM for the Cure of CONSUMPTIONS."

Godbold's Vegetable Balsam was an English patent medicine concocted by Nathaniel Godbold (d.1799) in 1785, and produced by Godbold and later his sons into the 19th century.

Godbold was originally a gingerbread baker, but his product became one of the best-selling patent medicines of the 18th century for asthma, tuberculosis, scrofula and various other respiratory illnesses. Though profits tailed off after the first ten years, Godbold made a small fortune and purchased a country estate from his profits.

== Novel advertising ==
After his death in 1799, his epitaph at the Church of St. Peter & St. Paul, Godalming was a literal advertisement for the product. The 1911 Encyclopædia Britannica even cited the epitaph in its entirety in its entry for advertising:

In concluding this review of methods of advertising, other than advertisements in periodical publications, we may add that the most extraordinary attempt at advertisement which is known to exist is to be found at the churchyard at Godalming, Surrey, where the following epitaph was placed upon a tombstone:—

Sacred
To the memory of
Nathaniel Godbold Esq.
Inventor & Proprietor
of that excellent medicine
The Vegetable Balsam
For the Cure of Consumptions & Asthmas.
He departed this Life
The 17th. day of Decr. 1799
Aged 69 years.
Hic Cineres, ubique Fama.

== Ingredients ==
An examination of the product around 1808 noted "we do not discover any property that can possibly entitle it to the appellation of a balsam, but the propriety of the term vegetable, we cannot dispute, as vinegar, sugar, and honey are vegetable productions." The product claimed to be produced from forty-two different vegetables, preserved separately in syrups, mixed with other gums and ingredients, and dissolved in double-distilled vinegar with some storax dissolved in spirits of wine and oil of cinnamon. It was then claimed to be bottled and held for three years before use. These elaborate directions would be impossible to ever follow, and scientific observers concluded the product was simply an "oxymel" (a form of mead created from honey and wine vinegar), though at times with some variation in ingredients.
