= Blue mass =

Mercury-based medicine common from the 17th to the 19th centuries

Blue mass (also known as blue pill or pilula hydrargyri) was a mercury-based treatment for syphilis common from the 17th to the 19th centuries. The oldest known formula is ascribed to the Barbary corsair Hayreddin Barbarossa, in a letter to Francis I of France.

== Description ==
Blue mass was used as a specific treatment for syphilis from at least the late 17th century to the early 18th. Blue mass was recommended as a remedy for such widely varied complaints as tuberculosis, constipation, toothache, parasitic infestations, and the pains of childbirth.

The Edinburgh New Dispensatory (1789) instructs as follows:

Pilula ex Hydrargyro [London] (Quicksilver-pills). Take of Purified quicksilver, Extract of liquorice, having the consistence of honey, of each two drams, Liquorice, finally powdered, one dram. Rub the quicksilver with the extract of liquorice until the globules disappear; then, add the liquorice-powder, mix them together.

A combination of blue mass and a mixture called the common black draught was a standard cure for constipation in early 19th century England and elsewhere. It was particularly valued on ships of the Royal Navy, where sailors and officers were constrained to eat rock-hard salted beef and pork, old stale biscuits (hardtack), and very little fruit, fiber, or other fresh food once they were at sea for an extended period.

It was a magistral preparation, compounded by pharmacists themselves based on their own recipes or on one of several widespread recipes. It was sold in the form of pills or syrups. The name probably derives from the use of blue dye in some formulations.

The ingredients of blue mass varied, as each pharmacist prepared it himself, but they all included mercury in either metallic or chloride form. One recipe of the period for blue mass syrup included:

- 33% mercury metal (measured by weight)
- 5% licorice extract
- 25% Althaea extract (unspecified if from hollyhock or marshmallow)
- 3% glycerol
- 34% rose honey

Pill formulations were produced by substituting milk sugar and rose oil for the glycerol and rose honey. Pills contained one grain (64.8 milligrams) of metallic mercury.

== Toxicity ==
Mercury is now known to be toxic, and medicinal use of mercury can lead to mercury poisoning, a form of heavy-metal poisoning. While mercury is still used in compound form in some types of medicines and for other purposes, blue mass contained excessive amounts of the metal: a typical daily dose of two or three blue mass pills represented ingestion of more than one hundred times the daily limits set by the Environmental Protection Agency in the United States today.

== Use by Abraham Lincoln ==
For several years before his election to the presidency, Abraham Lincoln is known to have taken blue-mass pills for treatment of chronic melancholia. It has been reported that during this time, Lincoln was known to have experienced neurological symptoms, including insomnia, tremor and rage attacks, which suggests he was suffering from mercury poisoning. However, a few months after his inauguration, Lincoln reportedly stopped taking the medication because he perceived the pills made him "cross".

In 2001, a study led by renowned public-health investigator Norbert Hirschhorn recreated a typical formulation, concluding that the quantity of blue mass that Lincoln likely took would have delivered "a daily dose of mercury exceeding the current Environmental Protection Agency safety standard by nearly 9000 times," which may have adversely affected his health.
