= Soliman's Water =

Soliman's Water was a brand of 16th century cosmetic lotion that was marketed as being able to remove blemishes on the skin, such as warts, spots and freckles. However, the main ingredient of this lotion was mercury salts, so it caused side-effects such as severe damage to the skin and loose teeth.
