= James Harvey Young =

American social historian (1915–2006)

- Born: September 8, 1915; Brooklyn, New York
- Died: July 29, 2006 (aged 90)
- Occupations: Professor, social historian

James Harvey Young (September 8, 1915 – July 29, 2006) was social historian most well known as an expert on the history of medical frauds and quackery.

Young was born in Brooklyn, New York. He received his Ph.D. in history from the University of Illinois. From 1941 he worked as a professor of history at Emory University.

His The Medical Messiahs: A Social History of Health Quackery in Twentieth-Century America (1967) was a scholarly volume that documented many of the medical frauds in the United States.

== Publications ==
- The Toadstool Millionaires: A Social History of Patent Medicines in America before Federal Regulation (1961)
- The Medical Messiahs: A Social History of Health Quackery in Twentieth-Century America (1967)
- American Self-Dosage Medicines: An Historical Perspective (1974)
- The Early Years of Federal Food and Drug Control (1982)
- Pure Food: Securing the Federal Food and Drugs Act of 1906 (1989)
- American Health Quackery: Collected Essays of James Harvey Young (1992)
