= James F. Ballard =

American entrepreneur and art collector

James Franklin Ballard (July 16, 1851 – April 23, 1931) was an American entrepreneur and art collector specializing in rugs from Asia and the Middle East, and medieval prints by such artists as Albrecht Dürer. During his lifetime his art collection achieved national fame among art critics and collectors.

== Art Collection ==
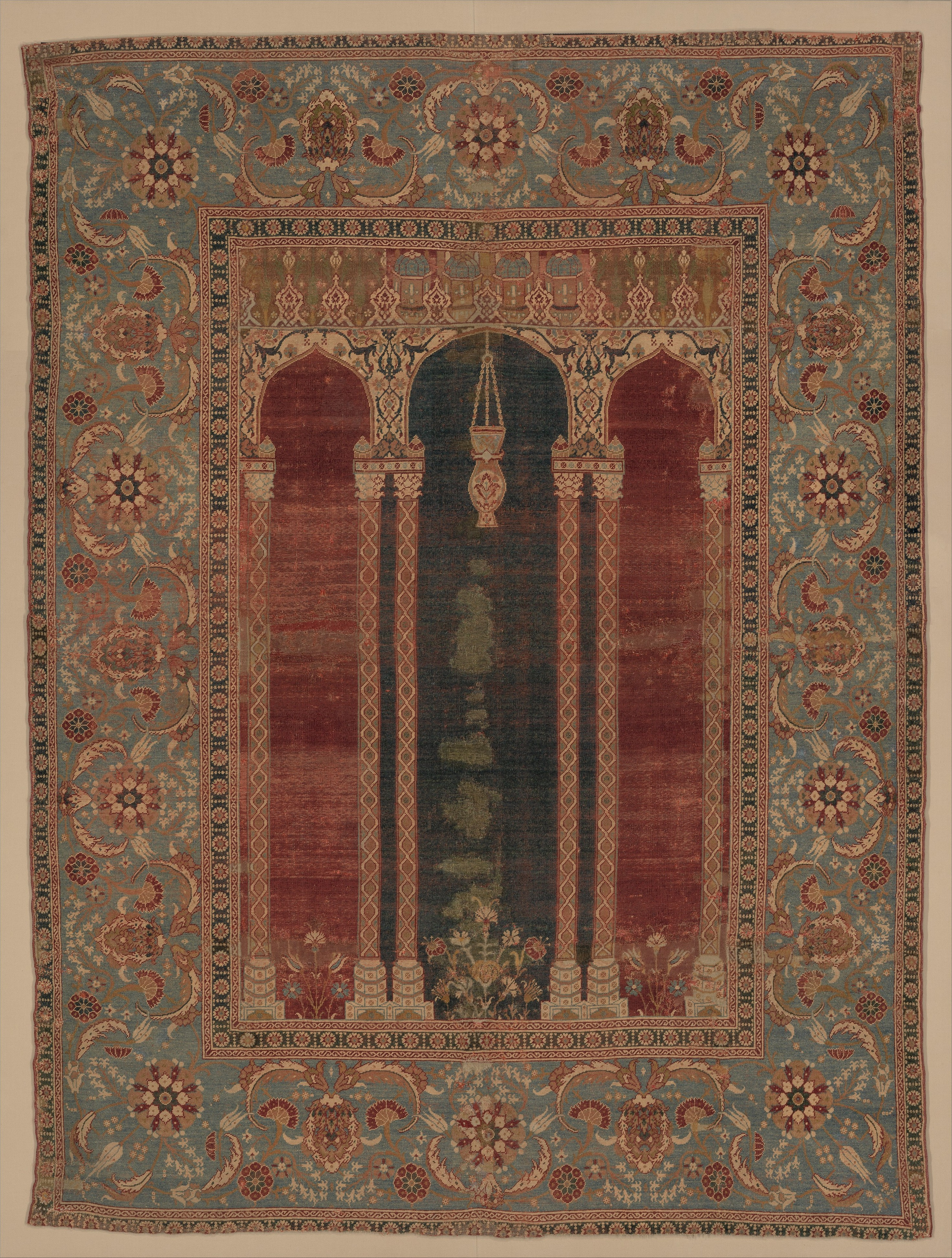
The James F. Ballard late 16th Century Bursa Prayer Rug. Ottoman Period

Ballard traveled the world in search of art to buy, but most especially rugs. He started collecting rugs in 1905 He traveled over 470,000 miles through Southeast Asia, China, the Caucasus Mountains, India, Northern Africa, the Middle East, and all over Europe. His travels found him in Egypt during the opening of Tutankhamun's tomb in 1922. He was briefly imprisoned by the Greek government, and witnessed the Great Fire of Smyrna (now İzmir).

The earliest of Ballard’s rugs are from the 10th century. In 1922 Ballard presented to the Metropolitan Museum of Art in New York, a collection of 126 oriental rugs that at the time was valued at half a million dollars. Later he brought an additional two rugs, one of which featured the coat of arms of Tamerlane, the founder of the Timurid Empire. He also gave a substantial collection of rugs to the Saint Louis Art Museum.

== Biography ==
Ballard was born in Ashtabula, Ohio to James Ballard and Eliza (Heath) Ballard. His parents owned a large tract of timber land in northern Michigan near Lapere.

=== Career ===
Despite the fact that his father had ample money from his timber farm, the younger Ballard chose to join the circus and travel the country at a young age. Later he started drug stores around the country and settled in Saint Louis, Missouri. While in Saint Louis, he became involved with the wholesale drug store chain, Richardson & Company.

In 1882 Ballard withdrew from Richardson & Company, and started his own business again, the Ballard Snow Liniment Company. This company manufactured one of the most widely advertised and distributed proprietary remedies of the time. It was the sales of this medicine that made his fortune. After 1923 his business was called James F. Ballard Incorporated of which he was the chief owner, and in later years the treasurer. Besides Ballard's Snow Liniment, he also sold: Swaim's Panacea, White's Cream Vermifuge, Campho Phenique, Smith's Bile Beans, Ozmanlis Nerve Pills, and Littell's Liquid Sulphur, all of which were advertised in his self-published book: Ballard's Book of the Great War.

Ballard also owned the Henry B. Platte company of New York. He was the director of the Mechanics-American National Bank, and of its successor, the First National Bank & Union Trust Company of Saint Louis.

=== Memberships ===
- The National Academy of Design in New York
- The Congressional Country Club in Washington, D.C.
- The Missouri Historical Society in Saint Louis
- The Saint Louis Archaeological Society
- The Saint Louis Club
- The Bankers Club of New York
- The Salmagundi Club of New York
- The Economic Club of New York
- The Lotus Club of New York

The personal papers of James F. Ballard are housed in the archives of the Saint Louis Art Museum. One can view a description of their contents at this link. They are available to researchers by appointment.
