= Lane's Emulsion =

Medicine manufactured in New Zealand

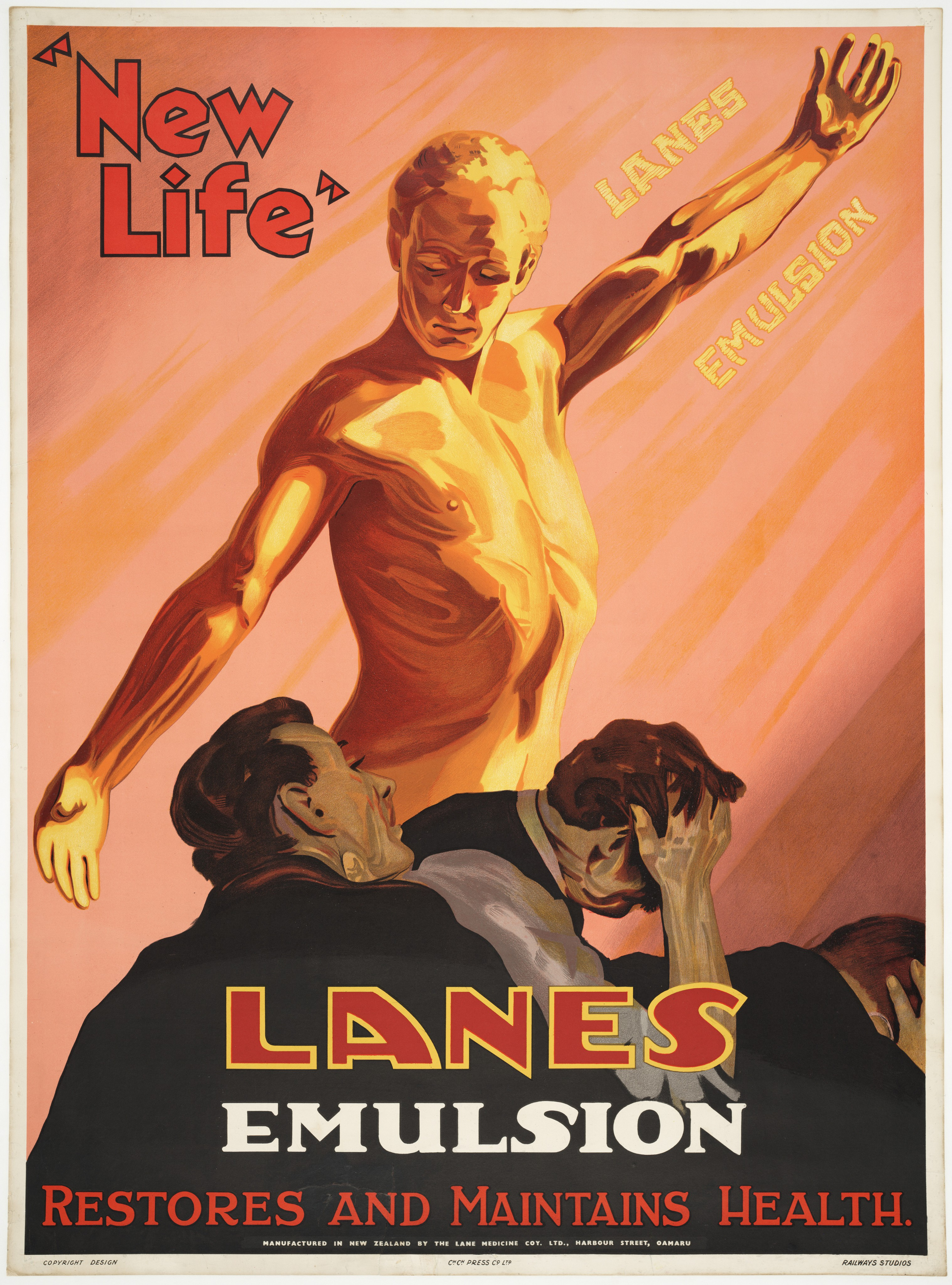
1927 advertisement for Lane's Emulsion by Stanley Davis

Lane's Emulsion was a patent medicine manufactured in New Zealand.

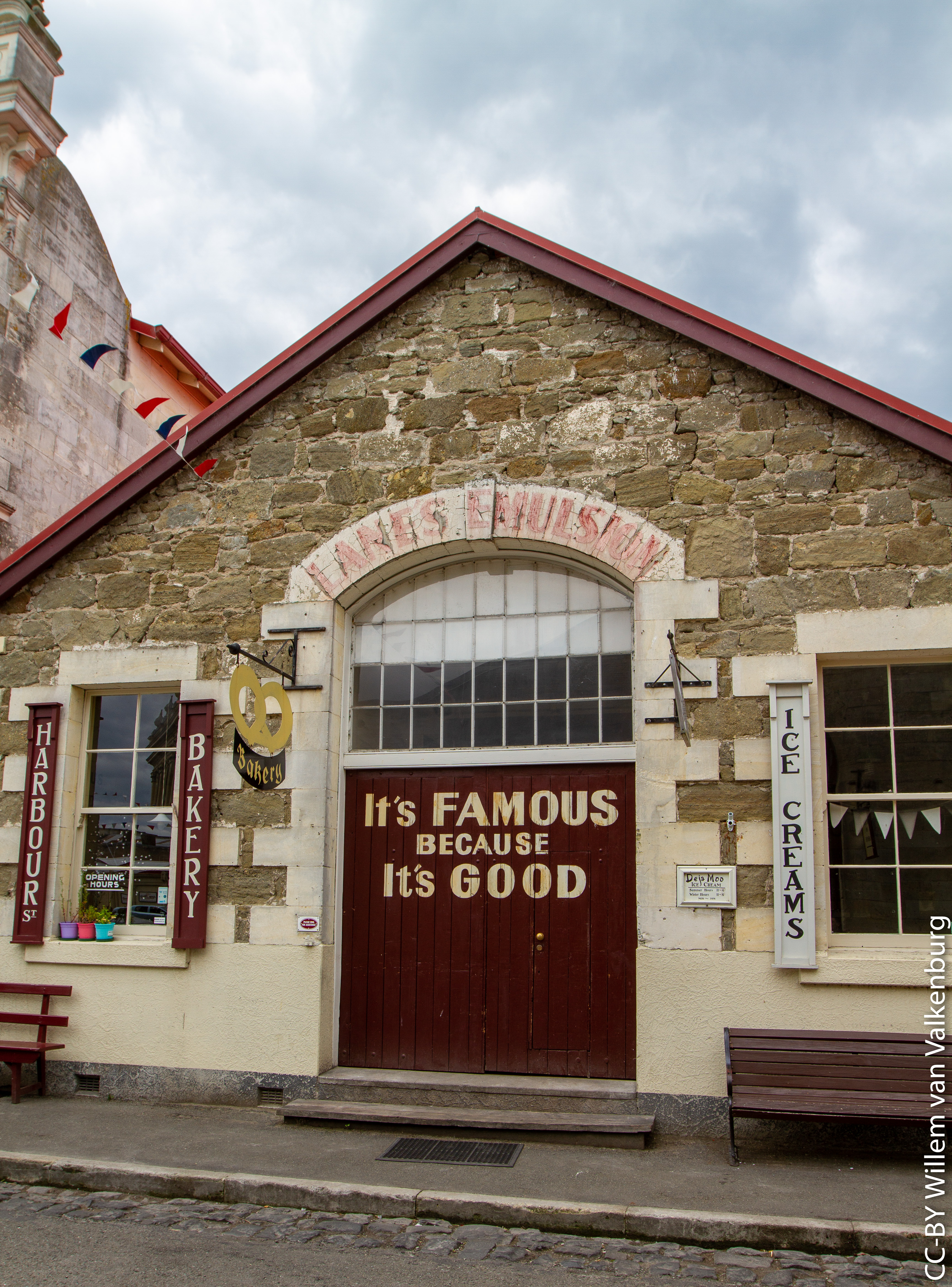
Lane's Emulsion factory, Oamaru

The emulsion, which had a strong fishy smell owing to its high cod liver oil content, was invented by Edward Lane, a chemist from Oamaru, in 1898. In 1908 the company opened a new factory in the town's Harbour Street (now part of the Oamaru Historic Precinct) in a building which still bears the product's slogan "It's famous because it's good". The original recipe contained cod liver oil, beechwood creosote, mineral lime, soda, brandy, vitamins, fresh egg yolk and some secret ingredients.

Sold in clear glass bottles, the thick cream-coloured liquid was fed to generations of New Zealand children and was also sold overseas. A branch factory was opened in Melbourne in the 1920s. Originally claiming to be "a reliable remedy for pulmonary ailments", the product was still in production until 1984. Oamaru company Crombie and Price, which bought Lane's Medicine in 1971, still holds the rights and recipe to the product.

An ice cream based on the flavour of Lane's Emulsion was launched in 2014.
