= Sequah Medicine Company =

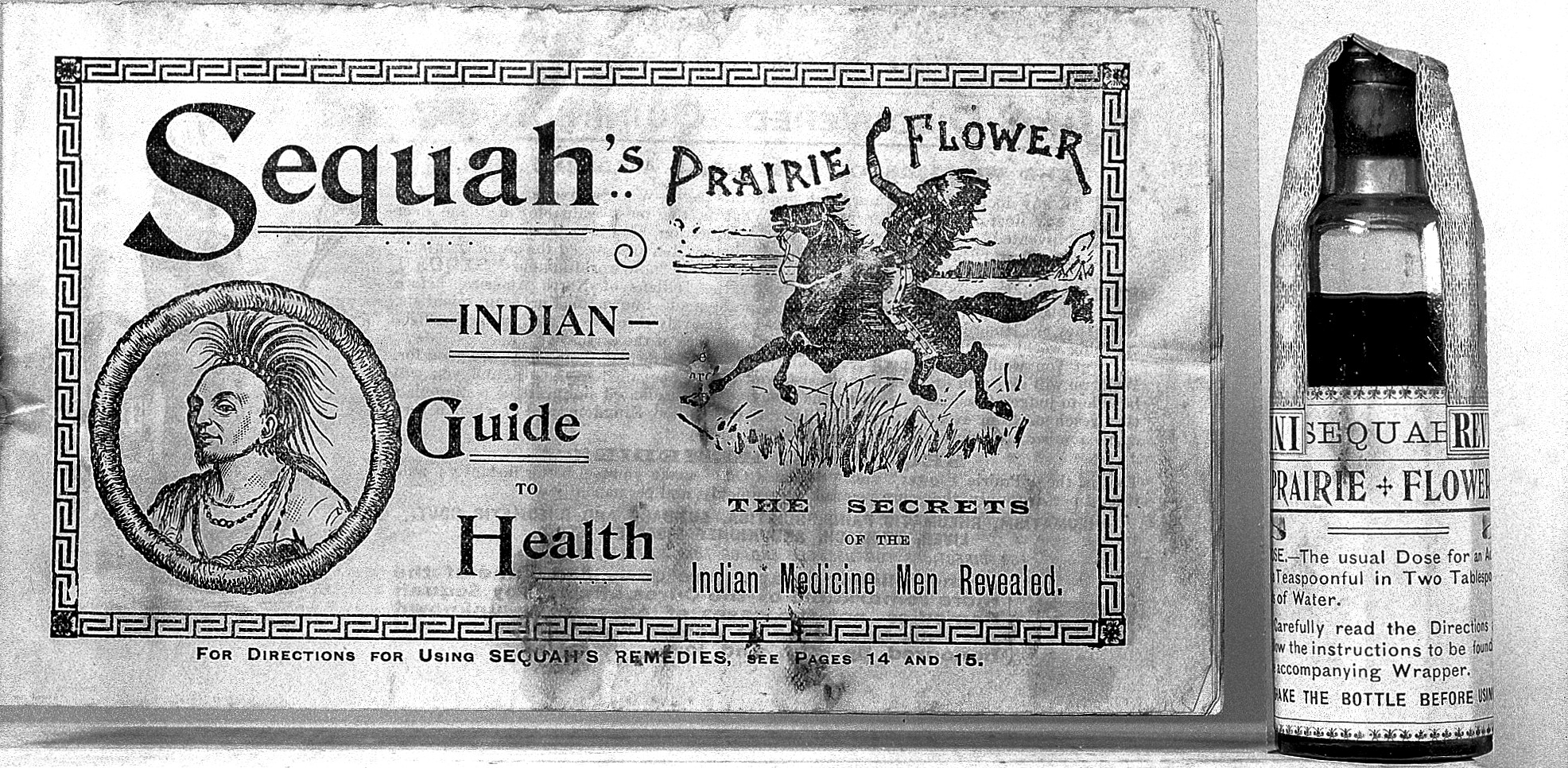
- Sequah's Prairie Flower ad
- Formerly: Sequah Medicine Co Ltd
- Founded: 1887; 139 years ago
- Founder: William Henry Hartley
- Defunct: 1909
- Fate: Liquidation
- Area served: Great Britain; Ireland

Sequah Medicine Company was a medicine company that began its operations in England in 1887. In 1890 it became a public company under the name Sequah Ltd. It sold patent medicines such as Sequah's Prairie Flower and Sequah's Indian oil using traveling salesmen, each known as Sequah. The traveling salesmen presented performances derived from American Medicine Shows, which combined music, preaching, and comedy with dental exhibitions and the selling of medicines. They performed to large audiences.

The original Sequah was William Henry Hartley, who founded the company selling supposed Native American remedies in Great Britain and Ireland. Other Sequahs included William Francis Hannaway Rowe, who was a herbalist and dentist born around 1841 in Hampshire; and Charles Frederick Rowley, who was born in West Bromwich. Another Sequah was the Glaswegian Peter Alexander Gordon, who went under the pseudonym James Kasper. Gordon sold the Sequah products in Great Britain, the West Indies and North America. Others operated in South Africa, South America, and Europe. Sequah's successful pitch quickly drew imitators, to the annoyance of Hartley.

The British Government soon declared the practice of selling patent medicines in such a fashion illegal, and the American Medicine Shows ceased to appeal once their novelty had worn off. The Sequah Ltd. company went into liquidation in 1895 (ratified in 1898). Its assets were acquired by the Sequah Medicine Company Ltd, which in turn was dissolved on March 26, 1909.
