= Black Draught =

Patent medicine used as a purgative

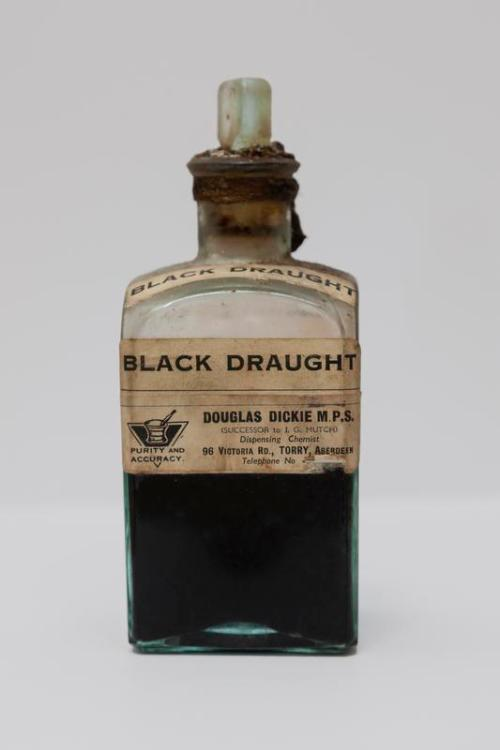
Black Draught from a ship's medicine chest

Black draught (Latin: Haustous) was a patent medicine used as a purgative in the 19th century and well into the early part of the 20th century, with veterinarians prescribing these to constipated cattle and horses. It is a saline aperient mixture used along with blue mass.

Isabella Beeton's Book of Household Management (1861) has a recipe for a black draught:

2587. The Common Black Draught.-- Infusion of Senna 10 drachms; epsom salts 10 drachms; tincture of senna, compound tincture of cardamums, compound spirit of lavender, of each 1 drachm. Families who make black draught in quantity, and wish to preserve it for some time without spoiling, should add about 2 drachms of spirits of hartshorn to each pint of the strained mixture, the use of this drug being to prevent its becoming mouldy or decomposed. A simpler and equally efficacious form of black draught is made by infusing 1/2 oz. of Alexandrian senna, 3 oz. of Epsom salts, and 2 drachms of bruised ginger and coriander-seeds, for several hours in a pint of boiling water, straining the liquor, and adding either 2 drachms of sal-volatile or spirits of hartshorn to the whole, and giving 3 tablespoonfuls for a dose to an adult.

Black-Draught is also the name of a once-common commercial liquid syrup laxative, sold since the late 19th century, a cathartic medicine composed of a blend of Senna and magnesia. Much like castor oil, it was a commonly used folk remedy for many ailments.

"Thedford's Black-Draught" was marketed through booklets such as the 1899 "The Ladies Birthday Almanac" by The Chattanooga Medicine Company.
