= The Toadstool Millionaires =

Book by James Harvey Young

- Author: James Harvey Young
- Subject: History of medicine, social history
- Publisher: Princeton University Press
- Publication date: 1961
- Pages: 282

The Toadstool Millionaires: A Social History of Patent Medicines in America before Federal Regulation is a book about patent medicines by social historian James Harvey Young.

== Bibliography ==
- Anderson, Oscar E. (1962). "Review of The Toadstool Millionaires: A Social History of Patent Medicines in America before Federal Regulation". The American Historical Review. 67 (4): 1048–1050. doi:10.2307/1845296. ISSN 0002-8762. JSTOR 1845296.
- Atherton, Lewis E. (1962). "Review of The Toadstool Millionaires: A Social History of Patent Medicines in America before Federal Regulation". The Mississippi Valley Historical Review. 48 (4): 716–717. doi:10.2307/1893172. ISSN 0161-391X. JSTOR 1893172.
- Berman, Alex (1962). "Review of The Toadstool Millionaires. A Social History of Patent Medicines in America before Federal Regulation". Journal of the History of Medicine and Allied Sciences. 17 (4): 537–539. doi:10.1093/jhmas/XVII.4.537. ISSN 0022-5045. JSTOR 24619675.
- Burnett, John (1962). "Review of The Toadstool Millionaires". The British Journal of Sociology. 13 (4): 382–383. doi:10.2307/587258. ISSN 0007-1315. JSTOR 587258.
- Cope, Zachary (1962). "The Toadstool Millionaires". The British Medical Journal. 2 (5296): 46–47. ISSN 0007-1447. JSTOR 20373970.
- Duffy, John (1962). "Review of The Toadstool Millionaires: A Social History of Patent Medicines in America before Federal Regulation". The Journal of Southern History. 28 (1): 106–107. doi:10.2307/2205545. ISSN 0022-4642. JSTOR 2205545.
- Dunn, James Taylor (1962). "Nostrums and Notions". Minnesota History. 38 (1): 39. ISSN 0026-5497. JSTOR 20176432.
- Fishbein, Morris (1962). "Review of The Toadstool Millionaires: A Social History of Patent Medicines in America before Federal Regulation". The Annals of the American Academy of Political and Social Science. 340: 156–157. doi:10.1177/000271626234000152. ISSN 0002-7162. JSTOR 1033744. S2CID 144144905.
- Lasagna, Louis (1962). "Review of The Toadstool Millionaires, A Social History of Patent Medicines in America before Federal Regulation". Bulletin of the History of Medicine. 36 (5): 482. ISSN 0007-5140. JSTOR 44451178.
- MacDonald, Curtis C. (1962). "Review of The Toadstool Millionaires: A Social History of Patent Medicines in America before Federal Regulation". American Quarterly. 14 (2): 221–222. doi:10.2307/2710658. ISSN 0003-0678. JSTOR 2710658.
- Miller, William (1962). "Review of The Toadstool Millionaires: A Social History of Patent Medicines in America before Federal Regulation". The Journal of Economic History. 22 (3): 419. doi:10.1017/S0022050700081249. ISSN 0022-0507. JSTOR 2114805.
- Newman, James R. (1963). "Review of The Toadstool Millionaires, YoungJames Harvey". Scientific American. 208 (3): 178–181. ISSN 0036-8733. JSTOR 24936509.
- Pepper, O. H. Perry (1962). "Review of The Toadstool Millionaires. A Social History of Patent Medicines in America before Federal Regulation". The Pennsylvania Magazine of History and Biography. 86 (1): 106–107. ISSN 0031-4587. JSTOR 20089488.
- Robertson, Charles W. (1962). "Review of The Toadstool Millionaires: A Social History of Patent Medicines in America before Federal Regulation". The New England Quarterly. 35 (1): 126–128. doi:10.2307/363739. ISSN 0028-4866. JSTOR 363739.
- Sonnedecker, Glenn (1961). "Medical Americana". Science. 134 (3490): 1610. doi:10.1126/science.134.3490.1610. ISSN 0036-8075. JSTOR 1707437.
- Stieb, Ernst W. (1961). "Review of The Toadstool Millionaires: A Social History of Patent Medicines in America before Federal Regulation". The Wisconsin Magazine of History. 45 (2): 138–139. ISSN 0043-6534. JSTOR 4633730.
- Stieb, Ernst W. (1961). "Toadstool Millionaires". Pharmacy in History. 6 (3/4): 43–44. ISSN 0031-7047. JSTOR 41108246.
- W., E. (1962). "Review of The Toadstool Millionaires: A Social History of Patent Medicines in America before Federal Regulation". Journal of the Illinois State Historical Society. 55 (1): 105–106. ISSN 0019-2287. JSTOR 40189761.
- Willy, Roy E. (1962). "Review of The Toadstool Millionaires". American Bar Association Journal. 48 (4): 343. ISSN 0002-7596. JSTOR 25721954.
