= Dennis Embleton =

English doctor (1810–1900)

Dennis Embleton (1 Oct 1810 – 12 November 1900) was a Newcastle medical doctor and surgeon of the middle and late 19th century.

== Early life ==
Dennis Embleton was born in Newcastle on 1 October 1810.

His father, Thomas Embleton was born in East Chevington and his mother Anne (née Cawood) from Alwinton village, which is west of Alnwick and at the head of the River Coquet. He had an elder brother Thomas William Embleton, was trained as a mining engineer and moved in 1831 to Middleton, Leeds, to the position of colliery viewer

His father died in 1820, and Dennis and his brother Thomas were brought up by an uncle, George Hill, also a colliery viewer, of Kenton, Newcastle.

Both he and his brother Thomnas William were educated at Witton-le-Wear Grammar School, County Durham, under the Rev. George Newby.

== Career ==
After leaving Witton School, he started his apprenticeship on 23 April 1827, bound to a Mr. Thomas Leighton, the Senior Surgeon at Newcastle Infirmary for a period of five years, the cost of which to his guardian, was £500, not an inconsiderately sum in those days. He left Newcastle before the end of his apprenticeship, with the permission and consent of Mr. Leighton, to complete his studies in London at Guy's Hospital, St Thomas' Hospital, Grainger's anatomical school at Maze Pond (in London), and probably also at Pilcher's School of Anatomy.

He qualified in 1834. After working for around a year, he spent the next two years travelling mainly on foot around Europe, with another medical student, William Croser. They both spoke French and Italian very well. They journeyed to Paris, Strasbourg, Baden, Switzerland, over the Simplon Pass, Milan, Genoa, Rome, Bologna, Pisa, Florence, Venice, Trieste, Vienna, The Tyrol and back to Paris. All the time, in addition to seeing the sights, they visited numerous medical establishments, and at Pisa they petitioned the university, sat the examination for doctorate of medicine, passed and were granted diplomas on 14 September 1836

== Marriage and family ==
Embleton was married in 1847 in Whickham to Miss Elizabeth Turner (died 1869), who also had a great interest in nature and the sciences; they had three children. Their son was Dennis Cawood Embleton (b. 9 March 1854), MD, MRCS, who predeceased him by a few months at Bournemouth, where he had a large practice. Embleton also had two daughters, one married.

Embleton's grandson, also named Dennis Embleton (b 14 March 1881) L.R.C.P. (MRCS at Christ's College, Cambridge 1906), went into the medical profession.

== Memberships and interests ==
- Vice-President of the Literary and Philosophical Society of Newcastle upon Tyne
- Vice-President of the Natural History Society of Newcastle
- Vice-President of the Antiquarian Society of Newcastle
- Involved with the new museum at Barras Bridge (later the Hancock Museum, and now Great North Museum) and presented them with many Natural History specimens
- A great interest in the regional dialect

== Time line ==
- 1834 (18 June) – Admitted as a Member of the Royal College of Surgeons
- 1835 (16 April) – Admitted as a Licentiate of the Society of Apothecaries
- 1835 (May) – He set off on his European Adventure
- 1836 – Finally ended his travels
- 1837 – Settled as physician in Newcastle upon Tyne
- 1839 (September) – Joined the Newcastle School of Medicine as Demonstrator of Practical Anatomy and Curator of the Museum
- 1850 – Commenced negotiations with Durham University for the medical school to become a college of Durham University
- 1852 – Appointed Reader in Medicine at the University of Durham
- 1853 – University of Durham admitted him to his M.D. degree by Diploma
- 1857 – Became a Fellow of the Royal College of Physicians
- 1870 – Appointed the first Professor of Medicine and of the Practice of Physic at University of Durham School of Medicine
- 1870 – Formal recognition of the College as 'University of Durham College of Medicine'. Denis Embleton was appointed in 1870 the first Professor of Medicine and of the Practice of Physic
- 1872 – Edward Charlton succeeded him, and thus his long tenure of office at Newcastle and Durham ceased after a period of thirty-three years.
- 1858 – 1872 – Representative of the University of Durham on the General Medical Council
- April 1853 – May 1878 – Physician to the Newcastle upon Tyne Infirmary from, when he became Consulting Physician.
- 1856–1873 – Physician to the Newcastle upon Tyne Dispensary and Fever House
- 1882 – President of the section of Sanitary Science and Preventive Medicine during the meeting of the Sanitary Science Congress in Newcastle.

== Later life ==
In 1898 Embleton had an accident, and two years later, at the age of 90 years, he died at his home, 19 Claremont Place, Newcastle upon Tyne, early on the morning of Monday 12 November 1900. He was buried in St Andrew's Cemetery, Newcastle

== Legacy ==
A portrait of Dennis Embleton accompanies his biography in The Lancet, and his photograph is in the Fellows' Album (1867)

== Dialect ==
Dennis Embleton had a keen interest in languages, and also in the local Geordie dialect. He wrote a document on the peculiarities of the local dialect in 1887, followed by a “canny little poem” called “The Ahd Pitman's Po'try tiv ees Marrah”. This poem appeared in the Newcastle Courant around 1890 with no indication of authorship, but Thomas Allan in his Illustrated Edition of Tyneside Songs attributed it to Embleton. This was later shown to be correct when details of his works were produced and printed with his bibliographical details in his official obituary.

== Bibliography ==
Includes :-

- Archaeologia Aeliana
1. 1886 – Uude derivator Corstopitum Vole xi page 137
2. 1887 – On certain Peculiarities of the Dialect in Newcastle upon Tyne and Northumberland Vol. xiii. p. 72 – see Local Dialect Dialogues section below
3. 1891 – Barber-surgeons and chandlers of Newcastle. Journal office (different from that in the Archaeologia Aeliana, vol. xv. p. 228) – see sundry papers section below
4. 1894 – Sidgate, Newcastle, the Swirle and the Lort Burn Vol xvii page 84
5. 1896 – Ruins of Buildings once existing on the Quayside, Newcastle. Vol. xvii p. 258
- Reports of the Newcastle and Gateshead Medical Society
1. On tenderness and pain of the pneumogastric nerves. Three parts; 1855–1874
2. Two cases of insufficiency of abdominal wall. Plate 1856
3. On mesenteric disease ending in fatal haemorrhage 1857
4. A case of extroversion of bladder, etc. 1857
5. A case of diphtheria – operation – death. 1858
6. A case of cancer of stomach – sarcina ventr. 1868
7. Three cases of 'dropped hands' from lead 1859
8. Case of hydrothorax – paracentesis – recovery. 1860
9. A case of cancer of the stomach. 1561
10. A case of schirrhus of oesophagus. 1861
11. A case of stricture of oesophagus. 1861
12. Two cases of hydro-pneumo – thorax. 1861
13. Two cases of diseased kidney. 1862
14. Annual report of Fever Hospital for 1857–68
15. ditto. ditto. for 1861–62
16. A case of cyanosis. 1862
17. A case of diseased spleen. 1863
18. On the use of chlorate of potass. 1863
19. An account of a post mortem examination of an inveterate smoker of tobacco
20. circa 1670 Translated from the Latin of Kerkringius. 1864
21. Report on a Turin monstrosity for Dr. Ellis. 1864
22. Report (annual) of Fever Hospital. 1864–65
23. On the cattle plague or typhus in Newcastle. 1865
24. A case of rupture of median line of abdomen in a male. 1867
25. A case of two fractured and united femora of an Ancient Briton. 1867
26. A case of occlusion of ductus comm. choledocus and rupture of gall bladder 1867
27. Case of aortic aneurism, pressing on the vena cava descendens and on the vena azygos 1868
28. Case of fractured skull with re-union in an Ancient Briton 1868
29. A case of aneurism of abdominal aorta 1869
30. A case of epilepsy – paralysis – recovery 1870
31. A case of salivary calculus 1870
32. Notes of a case of death from hydrate of chloral 1870
33. A case of hemiplegia and partial aphasia 1871
34. Sequel of a case of epilepsy 1871
35. A case of locomotor ataxy 1872
36. A case of hypertrophied heart 1873
37. Two cases of diabetes mellitus 1873
38. Oases of hydrophobia with remarks, etc. 1873
39. Magnetic iron ore in tea instead of iron filings 1874
40. Case of tumour (intracranial) at the base pressing on pons varolii, medulla oblongata and cerebellum. 1875
41. What is a generation of men ? 1875
42. Microscopical demonstration of Favus (Achorion Schoenleinii) 1875
43. A case of recto- vesical fistula in the male 1877
44. A case of psoriasis generalis 1877
45. A case of pyloric obstruction, etc. 1877
46. A case of acute pleuritis – hydrothorax – paracentesis – injection —recovery 1877
47. A case of aneurism of the aorta. 1880. Dr. R. Elliot's 1881
48. Vivisection and the Anti- Vivisection Acts 1881
49. Sea-sickness 1883
- Address on the opening of the Durham College of Medicine 1890
1. The Newcastle Medical Society One Hundred Years ago, with biographical notices of the members, etc. 1891
- Annual and Magazine of Natural History
1. On the Anatomy of Eolis, Nudibranchiate Mollusk. Part 1, by Albany Hancock and D. Embleton. Five plates 1845
2. On the Anatomy of Eolis. Part 2. Two plates 1848
3. do. do. Part 3. do 1849
4. do. do. Part 4. do 1849
5. An Osteological Study. By D. E. and G. B. Richardson 1846
- in Archaeological Journal
1. On the Anatomy of Scyllaea, Nudibranchiate Mollusk. Report British Association. 1847. Albany Hancock and D. Embleton
- Transactions of the Tyneside Naturalist Field Club
1. Vol. I p. 288 – Account of a Ribbon Fish (Gymnetrus) Two Plates By A. H. and D. E. July 1849
2. Vol. II p. 1 – Address to the members of the Tyneside Naturalists' Field Club on 22 March 1851
3. Vol. II p. 103 – On the two Species of Rat in England. Two plates 1850
4. Vol. II p. 110 – On the short Sunfish (Orthragoriscus Mola). One plate 1850
5. Vol. II p. 119 – Summary of Observations on the Anatomy of Doris, a Nudibranchiate Mollusk. By Albany Hancock and D. Embleton 1852
6. Vol IV p. 50 – Memorandum of the Occurrence of the Skeleton of the Bottle-nose whale (Hyperoodon butskopf Lacépède), and of the skull of the Grampus (Delphinus Orca, Cuvier), in the Bed of the Tyne 1858
7. Vol. V p. 196 – On the Skull and other Bones of Loxomma allmanni By D. E. and T. Atthey. 1874
8. Vol. VI p. 34 – Notes on a Tumulus at Grundstone Law, Northumberland By the Rev. W. .Greenwell and D. Embleton
- Natural History Transactions of Northumberland, Durham, and Newcastle-upon- Tyne
1. Vol. I p. 143 – On an Ancient British burial at Ilderton, with Notes on the skull. By the Rev. W. Greenwell and D. Embleton
2. Vol. I p. 324 – Notice of the Life of the late Joshua Alder, Esq
3. Vol. V p. 118 – Memoir of the Life of Albany Hancock, F.L.S., etc.
4. Vol. V p. 146 – On the Vendace
5. Vol. VIL – Presidential Address on 7 May
6. Vol. VII p. 43 – A Paper on Eggs
7. Vol. VII p. 223. Memoir of the Life of Mr. W. C. Hewitson, F.L.S
8. Vol. VIII – Note on the Birds seen at Nest House, Felling Shore, in May and June 1884; Note on the occurrence of Shrimps in the Tyne and Note on the capture of Tunnies and of a fine specimen of the *Bergylt' off the Tyne. June 1884
9. Vol. VIII – The Tyne, The Lort Burn, and The Skerne
10. Vol. VIII – On the Spinal Column of Loxomma Allmanni
11. Vol. IX – A Catalogue of Place-names in Teesdale
12. Vol. X – Description of Stump-Cross Cavern [quoted in president's address pp. 190
13. Vol. XL – Memoir of the Life of John Hancock. 1891
14. Vol. XI p. 255. – On the Egg: lecture with introduction 1893
- Other Publications
1. 1847 — On the anatomy of Scylloea. British Association Reports, 1847– Part ii p. 77
2. 1868 — Notes on whale caught at Newbiggin-on-Sea. [This is listed as being in the Nat. Mist. Trans., vol. vi, but cannot be found in that publication
3. 1859 — The microscope and its uses : a newspaper report
4. 1864 — Notes on anatomy of Chimpanzee. Nat. Hist. Review
5. 1869 — Anniversary address of President, Northern Branch of the British Medical Association at Newcastle, 1869
6. 1870 — Introductory address, section of medicine, annual meeting British Medical Association, Newcastle, 1870
7. 1872 — Anomalies of arrangement, muscular, aiterial, nervous. Journal of
8. Anatomy and Physiology, vol. vi p. 216 1872
9. 1870 — On the Shoulder Tip Pain, and other Sympathetic Pains in Diseases of the Pancreas and Spleen, and on the symmetry of these organs.
- Letter from physicians to governors of Fever Hospital
1. 1877 — Case of univentricular or tricoelian heart; with Dr. Rob. Elliot
2. 1882 — Address delivered at the anniversary meeting of the Northern Branch of the British Medical Association in Newcastle, 13 July 1882
3. 1882 – On the treatment of sea-sickness. Journal of Medicine, No 32 1882
4. 1882-3 Address of President to section of sanitary science and preventive medicine. Trans. Sanitary Institute of Great Britain, 1882–83
5. 1890 — History of the Medical School, from 1832 to 1872
6. 1890 — Address at the Opening of the Durham College of Medicine, on the 1st day of October 1890
7. 1890 — Newcastle Medical Society a hundred years ago
8. 1890 — Biographical notices on members of the Philosophical and Medical Society one hundred years ago
- Local Dialect Dialogues
1. 1887 — On certain Peculiarities of the Dialect in Newcastle-upon-Tyne and Northumberland. Published in Archaeologia Aeliana Vol. xiii. p. 72
2. 1890 Oct, The Ahd Pitman's Po'try tiv ees Marrah
- Sundry papers etc.
1. 1889 —The 'Three Indian Kings' on the Quayside, Newcastle. A paper read at the inaugural dinner at the Quayside Restaurant, Limited 17 December 1888
2. 1891 – Barber-surgeons and chandlers of Newcastle. Journal office (different from that in the Archaeologia Aeliana, vol. xv. p. 228)
3. 1880–81 – A Visit to Madeira in the Winter of 1880–81. Two lectures delivered before the members of the Literary and Philosophical Society of Newcastle
4. Paper on a short History of Featherstone Castle

== See also ==
Geordie dialect words
Thomas Allan
Allan's Illustrated Edition of Tyneside Songs and Readings
