= Fruit salt =

Compound of organic acids

A fruit salt or fruit salts is an effervescent compound made up of organic acids such as citric acid or tartaric acid and salts such as sodium bicarbonate, sodium carbonate, or sodium bitartrate in combination with added flavoring and sugar. Historically, fruit salts were sold for a wide range of ailments, and today they are used primarily as antacids.

== History ==
In the seventeenth and eighteenth centuries, scientists began uncovering the chemical make-up and physiological benefits of various salts such as Glauber's salt and Epsom salts. The fact that these were found in mineral springs led to the rise of spas, where people would go to bathe in and drink mineral-rich waters for their health. These developments led to attempts to replicate the salt mixtures found in these naturally occurring mineral waters using off-the-shelf ingredients. Mixing these kinds of salts — especially carbonates and tartrates — with flavorings like lemon into an effervescent compound with citric or tartaric acid proved especially popular and set off a craze for the new "fruit salts".

The name comes not from the popular fruit flavorings but from the fact that the acid in the mixture — which was then sourced from either citrus fruit (citric acid) or grapes (tartaric acid) — forms further salts such monosodium citrate in solution with the carbonates or tartrates. "Fruit salt" thus refers both to the fruit-derived salts formed in solution and metonymically to the mixture as a whole.

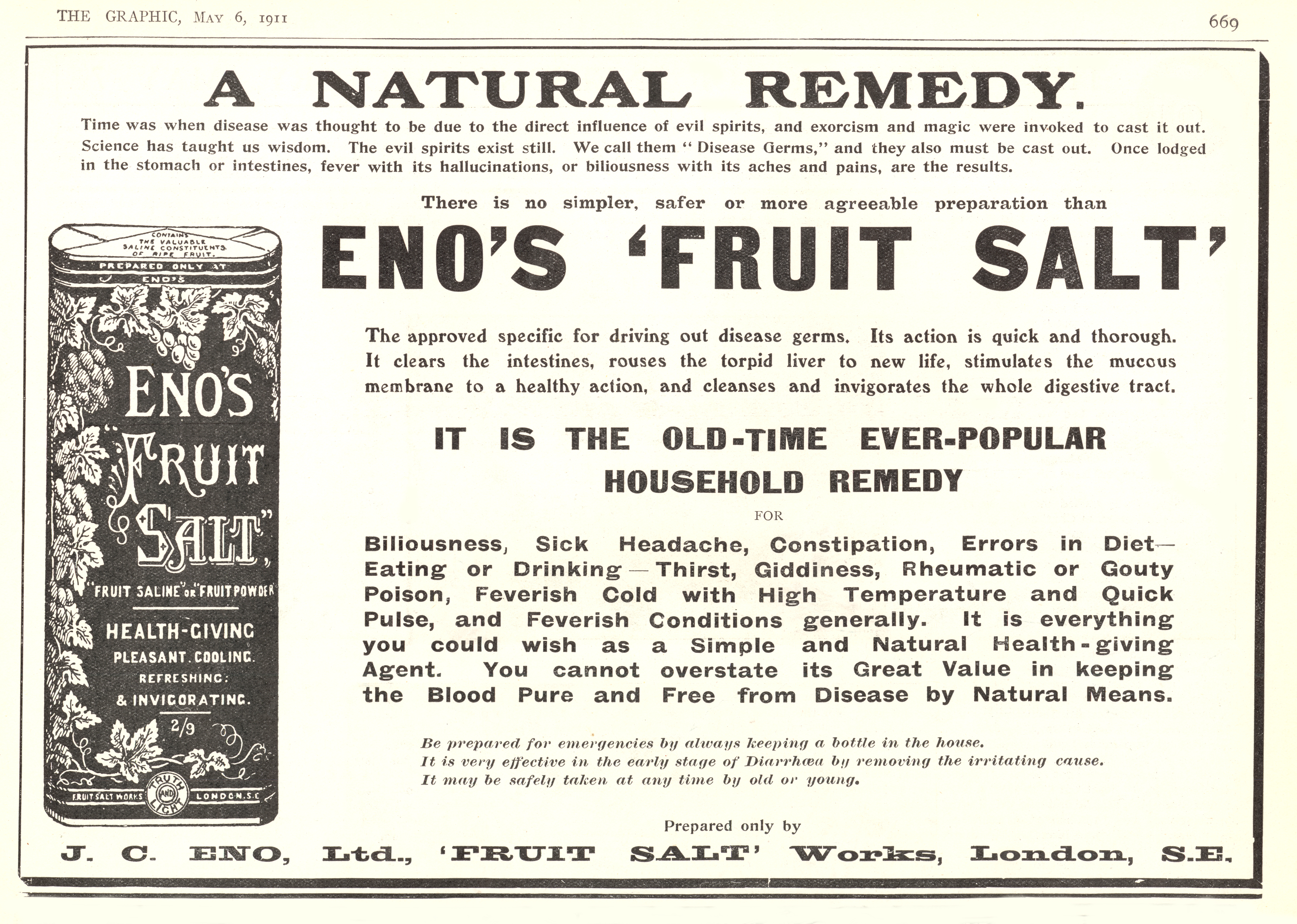
ad for Eno's 'Fruit Salt'

In 1852, the British pharmacist James Crossley Eno started selling such a fruit salt mixture from his pharmacy in the port city of Newcastle upon Tyne. Eno gave away his mixture to seafarers at the port, and in this way the name Eno became associated with fruit salts around the world. In 1868, he formally founded the company Eno's 'Fruit Salt' Works.

Eno's success spawned many competitors in both Great Britain and the United States, including Abbey's Effervescent Salts, Dunn's Fruit Salt, Slaven's California Fruit Salt, and Dr. Edison Obesity Fruit Salts, for which in 1897 performer Alice J. Shaw became one of the earliest celebrity spokespersons for a weight loss product. In the style of patent medicines and quackery, they were advertised hyperbolically for an enormous range of diseases and ailments, only some of which they could ameliorate (e.g. indigestion). The range spanned from cholera to gout, rheumatism, colds, fevers, biliousness, indigestion, diarrhea, pimples, and headaches.

As the pharmaceutical industry moved away from cure-all patent medicines in the mid twentieth century, Eno Fruit Salt became one of the few surviving products of its kind. Currently owned by GlaxoSmithKline, Eno Fruit Salt is today sold as an antacid, and its main ingredients are now sodium bicarbonate, sodium carbonate, and citric acid. Its main market is in India.
