= Nora =

Nora, NORA, or Norah may refer to:

- Nora (name), a feminine given name

== People with the surname ==
- Nora (surname)

== Places ==
=== Australia ===
- Norah Head, headland on the Central Coast of New South Wales

=== Canada ===
- Mount Nora, a mountain on Vancouver Island, British Columbia

=== Eritrea ===
- Nora (island), island in the Dahlak Archipelago of Eritrea

=== Ethiopia ===
- Gendebelo, an archaeological site in Ethiopia also called Nora.

=== Italy ===
- Nora, Italy, archaeological site in Sardinia

=== Russia ===
- Nora (Russia), a river in the Russian Far East

=== Spain ===
- Nora (Spain), a river in the north of Spain, tributary of the Nalón River

=== Sweden ===
- Nora, Sweden
- Nora Municipality
- Nora and Hjulsjö Mountain District, district of Västmanland

=== Turkey ===
- Nora (Cappadocia), a town of ancient Cappadocia, now in Turkey

=== United States ===
- Nora, Idaho, an unincorporated community
- Nora, Illinois, village in Jo Daviess County
- Nora, Indianapolis, Indiana, a neighborhood
- Nora, Michigan, a former settlement
- Nora, Nebraska, village in Nuckolls County
- Nora, Virginia, unincorporated town in Dickenson County
- Nora, Wisconsin, unincorporated community in Dane County
- Nora Township, Clearwater County, Minnesota
- Nora Township, Jo Daviess County, Illinois
- Nora Township, Pope County, Minnesota
- Nora School, a high school in Silver Spring, Maryland

=== Zimbabwe ===
- Glen Norah, Harare, high-density suburb

== Films ==
- Nora (1923 film), German drama, silent film directed by Berthold Viertel
- Nora (1944 film), German drama directed by Harald Braun
- Nora (2000 film), directed by Pat Murphy, about Nora Barnacle and her husband James Joyce
- Nora (2008 film), South African documentary directed by Alla Kovgan and David Hinton

== Music ==
- NORA (band), hardcore band
- "Nora", a song by The Long Winters from the 2003 album When I Pretend to Fall
- "Nora", a song written by Irving Berlin 1927–31
- "Nora", an alternative name for the folk song "When You and I Were Young, Maggie"

== Organizations ==
- Nora Industrier, a Norwegian manufacturer of soft drinks and foodstuffs
- Restaurant Nora, an organic restaurant in Washington, D.C., United States
- National Occupational Research Agenda, United States

== Television ==
- Nora (TV series), from Venezuela
- Nora (The Flash episode), a 2018 episode of The Flash

== Weapons ==
- Gun-howitzer M84 NORA, a Yugoslav-made weapon
- Nora B-52, a Serbian self-propelled howitzer

== Other uses ==
- 783 Nora, minor planet orbiting the Sun
- Menora (dance), traditional Thai dance drama
- National Online Repository of the Arts in Singapore, co-founded by writer Madeline Lee
- Nora (EWTC show), a theatre show by the East West Theatre Company, Sarajevo, Bosnia and Herzegovina
- Nora Stone, an ancient inscription found at Nora, Italy
- Nora (cat), known for playing the piano
- Nora (2022 storm), Danish name for a 2022 cyclone over northwestern Europe
- Tropical Storm Nora, several storms
