= Nora Township, Minnesota =

Nora Township is the name of the following places in the U.S. state of Minnesota:

- Nora Township, Clearwater County, Minnesota
- Nora Township, Pope County, Minnesota

== See also ==
- Nora Township (disambiguation)
- Nora (disambiguation)
