= Results of the 1921 Swedish general election =

Swedish general election results – 1921

Sweden held a general election throughout September 1921.

== Results ==
| Party | Votes | % | Seats | +/– |
|---|---|---|---|---|
| Swedish Social Democratic Party | 630,855 | 36.22 | 93 | +18 |
| General Electoral League | 449,302 | 25.79 | 62 | –9 |
| Free-minded National Association | 325,608 | 18.69 | 41 | –6 |
| Farmers' League | 192,269 | 11.04 | 21 | –9 |
| Communist Party | 80,355 | 4.61 | 7 | 0 |
| Social Democratic Left Party | 56,241 | 3.23 | 6 | New |
| Other parties | 7,322 | 0.42 | 0 | 0 |
| Total | 1,741,952 | 100.00 | 230 | 0 |
| Valid votes | 1,741,952 | 99.68 | | |
| Invalid/blank votes | 5,601 | 0.32 | | |
| Total votes | 1,747,553 | 100.00 | | |
| Registered voters/turnout | 3,222,917 | 54.22 | | |
Source: Nohlen & Stöver

== Regional results ==
=== Percentage share ===
| Location | Share | Votes | S | AV | F | B | K | SV | Other | Left | Right |
|---|---|---|---|---|---|---|---|---|---|---|---|
| Götaland | 51.2 | 892,240 | 36.4 | 31.7 | 15.8 | 13.1 | 1.5 | 1.6 | 0.0 | 39.5 | 60.5 |
| Svealand | 33.2 | 577,896 | 42.6 | 20.4 | 20.1 | 7.0 | 7.6 | 1.1 | 1.2 | 51.3 | 47.5 |
| Norrland | 15.6 | 271,816 | 22.0 | 17.9 | 25.3 | 13.0 | 8.7 | 13.1 | 0.0 | 43.8 | 56.1 |
| Total | 100.0 | 1,741,952 | 36.2 | 25.8 | 18.7 | 11.0 | 4.6 | 3.2 | 0.4 | 44.1 | 55.5 |
Source: SCB

=== By votes ===
| Location | Share | Votes | S | AV | F | B | K | SV | Other | Left | Right |
|---|---|---|---|---|---|---|---|---|---|---|---|
| Götaland | 51.2 | 892,240 | 325,099 | 282,891 | 140,752 | 116,527 | 12,991 | 13,935 | 45 | 352,025 | 540,170 |
| Svealand | 33.2 | 577,896 | 245,919 | 117,867 | 116,093 | 40,454 | 43,728 | 6,617 | 7,218 | 296,264 | 274,414 |
| Norrland | 15.6 | 271,816 | 59,837 | 48,544 | 68,763 | 35,288 | 23,636 | 35,689 | 59 | 119,162 | 152,595 |
| Total | 100.0 | 1,741,952 | 630,855 | 449,302 | 325,608 | 192,269 | 80,355 | 56,241 | 7,322 | 767,451 | 967,179 |
Source: SCB

== Constituency results ==
=== Percentage share ===
| Location | Land | Share | Votes | S | AV | F | B | K | SV | Other | Left | Right | Margin |
| Location | | % | | % | % | % | % | % | % | % | % | % | |
|---|---|---|---|---|---|---|---|---|---|---|---|---|---|
| Blekinge | G | 2.3 | 40,773 | 40.9 | 30.3 | 18.3 | 8.1 | 0.0 | 2.4 | 0.0 | 43.4 | 56.6 | 5,415 |
| Bohuslän | G | 3.1 | 54,645 | 34.9 | 36.2 | 17.5 | 10.1 | 1.3 | 0.0 | 0.0 | 36.1 | 63.9 | 15,152 |
| Gothenburg | G | 3.8 | 65,360 | 54.3 | 27.5 | 13.5 | 0.0 | 4.7 | 0.0 | 0.0 | 59.0 | 41.0 | 11,828 |
| Gotland | G | 0.9 | 15,467 | 14.9 | 21.1 | 15.5 | 48.4 | 0.0 | 0.0 | 0.1 | 14.9 | 85.0 | 10,849 |
| Gävleborg | N | 4.6 | 80,608 | 41.2 | 8.6 | 17.5 | 13.4 | 8.6 | 10.7 | 0.0 | 60.4 | 39.6 | 16,830 |
| Halland | G | 2.7 | 46,620 | 28.7 | 36.3 | 12.4 | 22.7 | 0.0 | 0.0 | 0.0 | 28.7 | 71.3 | 19,844 |
| Jämtland | N | 2.1 | 37,106 | 15.5 | 15.2 | 34.4 | 19.1 | 8.5 | 7.3 | 0.0 | 31.3 | 68.7 | 13,886 |
| Jönköping | G | 4.3 | 74,111 | 19.6 | 38.0 | 20.5 | 15.4 | 0.0 | 6.5 | 0.0 | 26.0 | 73.9 | 35,497 |
| Kalmar | G | 3.5 | 61,127 | 23.1 | 45.8 | 12.7 | 12.1 | 3.5 | 2.8 | 0.0 | 29.5 | 70.5 | 25,095 |
| Kopparberg | S | 4.3 | 74,769 | 36.2 | 8.8 | 26.1 | 13.1 | 10.9 | 4.7 | 0.0 | 51.9 | 48.1 | 2,888 |
| Kristianstad | G | 4.0 | 70,018 | 36.5 | 26.8 | 27.0 | 7.8 | 0.0 | 1.8 | 0.0 | 38.4 | 61.6 | 16,295 |
| Kronoberg | G | 2.6 | 45,464 | 25.2 | 40.5 | 14.8 | 15.5 | 0.0 | 4.0 | 0.0 | 29.2 | 70.8 | 18,946 |
| Malmö area | G | 4.0 | 70,186 | 60.5 | 33.6 | 4.9 | 0.0 | 1.1 | 0.0 | 0.0 | 61.6 | 38.4 | 16,228 |
| Malmöhus | G | 5.5 | 96,140 | 52.0 | 16.6 | 12.0 | 18.7 | 0.8 | 0.0 | 0.0 | 52.7 | 47.3 | 5,260 |
| Norrbotten | N | 2.2 | 37,784 | 6.7 | 28.8 | 16.6 | 10.1 | 21.1 | 16.7 | 0.0 | 44.5 | 55.5 | 4,144 |
| Skaraborg | G | 3.8 | 65,882 | 20.8 | 33.0 | 21.4 | 20.4 | 2.4 | 2.0 | 0.0 | 25.2 | 74.8 | 32,692 |
| Stockholm | S | 8.4 | 146,858 | 45.5 | 32.9 | 9.8 | 0.0 | 6.4 | 0.6 | 4.9 | 52.5 | 42.7 | 14,377 |
| Stockholm County | S | 3.9 | 67,108 | 47.7 | 26.4 | 13.6 | 5.7 | 6.5 | 0.0 | 0.0 | 54.2 | 45.8 | 5,657 |
| Södermanland | S | 3.3 | 56,944 | 47.2 | 15.6 | 26.5 | 7.0 | 3.8 | 0.0 | 0.0 | 51.0 | 49.0 | 1,091 |
| Uppsala | S | 2.5 | 42,862 | 39.2 | 18.9 | 21.2 | 13.3 | 3.5 | 3.7 | 0.0 | 46.5 | 53.5 | 3,003 |
| Värmland | S | 4.6 | 79,333 | 36.1 | 16.5 | 29.5 | 5.5 | 12.4 | 0.0 | 0.0 | 48.5 | 51.5 | 2,417 |
| Västerbotten | N | 2.5 | 43,756 | 6.4 | 33.0 | 44.0 | 7.3 | 0.0 | 9.1 | 0.1 | 15.6 | 84.3 | 30,063 |
| Västernorrland | N | 4.2 | 72,562 | 21.4 | 14.6 | 22.5 | 14.3 | 7.7 | 19.4 | 0.0 | 48.5 | 51.5 | 2,170 |
| Västmanland | S | 2.9 | 50,752 | 44.5 | 12.1 | 19.2 | 13.7 | 9.2 | 1.2 | 0.1 | 54.9 | 45.0 | 5,023 |
| Älvsborg N | G | 2.7 | 47,582 | 31.5 | 26.8 | 22.5 | 17.2 | 0.0 | 2.0 | 0.0 | 33.5 | 66.5 | 15,729 |
| Älvsborg S | G | 2.4 | 42,332 | 19.4 | 49.2 | 12.7 | 16.2 | 0.0 | 2.5 | 0.0 | 21.8 | 78.2 | 23,835 |
| Örebro | S | 3.4 | 59,270 | 42.3 | 15.1 | 26.5 | 9.9 | 6.2 | 0.0 | 0.0 | 48.5 | 51.5 | 1,766 |
| Östergötland | G | 5.5 | 96,533 | 44.8 | 25.3 | 13.5 | 12.3 | 4.1 | 0.0 | 0.0 | 48.9 | 51.1 | 2,112 |
| Total | | 100.0 | 1,741,952 | 36.2 | 25.8 | 18.7 | 11.0 | 4.6 | 3.2 | 0.4 | 44.1 | 55.5 | 199,728 |
Source: SCB

=== By votes ===
| Location | Land | Share | Votes | S | AV | F | B | K | SV | Other | Left | Right | Margin |
| Location | | % | | | | | | | | | | | |
|---|---|---|---|---|---|---|---|---|---|---|---|---|---|
| Blekinge | G | 2.3 | 40,773 | 16,692 | 12,343 | 7,466 | 3,285 | | 987 | | 17,679 | 23,094 | 5,415 |
| Bohuslän | G | 3.1 | 54,645 | 19,046 | 19,801 | 9,560 | 5,536 | 699 | | 3 | 19,745 | 34,897 | 15,152 |
| Gothenburg | G | 3.8 | 65,360 | 35,495 | 17,973 | 8,793 | | 3,099 | | | 38,594 | 26,766 | 11,828 |
| Gotland | G | 0.9 | 15,467 | 2,305 | 3,262 | 2,401 | 7,491 | | | 8 | 2,305 | 13,154 | 10,849 |
| Gävleborg | N | 4.6 | 80,608 | 33,196 | 6,971 | 14,079 | 10,839 | 6,928 | 8,595 | | 48,719 | 31,889 | 16,830 |
| Halland | G | 2.7 | 46,620 | 13,386 | 16,900 | 5,770 | 10,560 | | | 4 | 13,386 | 33,230 | 19,844 |
| Jämtland | N | 2.1 | 37,106 | 5,740 | 5,637 | 12,783 | 7,075 | 3,161 | 2,708 | 2 | 11,609 | 25,495 | 13,886 |
| Jönköping | G | 4.3 | 74,111 | 14,509 | 28,148 | 15,220 | 11,434 | | 4,796 | 4 | 19,305 | 54,802 | 35,497 |
| Kalmar | G | 3.5 | 61,127 | 14,106 | 27,982 | 7,752 | 7,374 | 2,165 | 1,742 | 6 | 18,013 | 43,108 | 25,095 |
| Kopparberg | S | 4.3 | 74,769 | 27,096 | 6,603 | 19,531 | 9,804 | 8,182 | 3,548 | 5 | 38,826 | 35,938 | 2,888 |
| Kristianstad | G | 4.0 | 70,018 | 25,583 | 18,781 | 18,926 | 5,448 | | 1,277 | 3 | 26,860 | 43,155 | 16,295 |
| Kronoberg | G | 2.6 | 45,464 | 11,450 | 18,430 | 6,722 | 7,050 | | 1,806 | 6 | 13,256 | 32,202 | 18,946 |
| Malmö area | G | 4.0 | 70,186 | 42,466 | 23,569 | 3,410 | | 741 | | | 43,207 | 26,979 | 16,228 |
| Malmöhus | G | 5.5 | 96,140 | 49,969 | 15,963 | 11,516 | 17,959 | 729 | | 4 | 50,698 | 45,438 | 5,260 |
| Norrbotten | N | 2.2 | 37,784 | 2,548 | 10,892 | 6,269 | 3,803 | 7,958 | 6,314 | | 16,820 | 20,964 | 4,144 |
| Skaraborg | G | 3.8 | 65,882 | 13,703 | 21,735 | 14,122 | 13,430 | 1,565 | 1,327 | | 16,595 | 49,287 | 32,692 |
| Stockholm | S | 8.4 | 146,858 | 66,822 | 48,266 | 14,392 | | 9,350 | 863 | 7,165 | 77,035 | 62,658 | 14,377 |
| Stockholm County | S | 3.9 | 67,108 | 32,023 | 17,748 | 9,144 | 3,832 | 4,358 | | 3 | 36,381 | 30,724 | 5,657 |
| Södermanland | S | 3.3 | 56,944 | 26,879 | 8,874 | 15,078 | 3,974 | 2,138 | | 1 | 29,017 | 27,926 | 1,091 |
| Uppsala | S | 2.5 | 42,862 | 16,818 | 8,118 | 9,091 | 5,722 | 1,513 | 1,597 | 3 | 19,928 | 22,931 | 3,003 |
| Värmland | S | 4.6 | 79,333 | 28,640 | 13,116 | 23,425 | 4,333 | 9,817 | | 2 | 38,457 | 40,874 | 2,417 |
| Västerbotten | N | 2.5 | 43,756 | 2,818 | 14,423 | 19,273 | 3,187 | | 4,002 | 53 | 6,820 | 36,883 | 30,063 |
| Västernorrland | N | 4.2 | 72,562 | 15,535 | 10,621 | 16,359 | 10,384 | 5,589 | 14,070 | 4 | 35,194 | 37,364 | 2,170 |
| Västmanland | S | 2.9 | 50,752 | 22,586 | 6,166 | 9,736 | 6,945 | 4,675 | 609 | 35 | 27,870 | 22,847 | 5,023 |
| Älvsborg N | G | 2.7 | 47,582 | 14,969 | 12,743 | 10,723 | 8,188 | | 956 | 3 | 15,925 | 31,654 | 15,729 |
| Älvsborg S | G | 2.4 | 42,332 | 8,204 | 20,834 | 5,379 | 6,870 | | 1,044 | 1 | 9,248 | 33,083 | 23,835 |
| Örebro | S | 3.4 | 59,270 | 25,055 | 8,976 | 15,696 | 5,844 | 3,695 | | 4 | 28,750 | 30,516 | 1,766 |
| Östergötland | G | 5.5 | 96,533 | 43,216 | 24,427 | 12,992 | 11,902 | 3,993 | | 3 | 47,209 | 49,321 | 2,112 |
| Total | | 100.0 | 1,741,952 | 630,855 | 449,302 | 325,608 | 192,269 | 80,355 | 56,241 | 7,322 | 767,451 | 967,179 | 199,728 |
Source: SCB

== Results by city and district ==
Since the Communists and the Social Democratic Left did not run against each other in many constituencies, their results were listed together in the official statistics and thus inseparable at a district and city level when not in one-city constituencies (Gothenburg and Stockholm). As a result, they have been listed under "K/V" (Swedish for Communist-Left) in the results.

The Communists stood alone for the left in Bohuslän, Gothenburg, the two Malmöhus constituencies, Stockholm County, Södermanland, Värmland, Örebro and Östergötland County.

The Socialist Left stood alone for the left in Blekinge, Jönköping, Kristianstad, Kronoberg, Västerbotten and both Älvsborg constituencies.

In the remaining constituencies either both or none stood.

The Farmers' League did not contest the three major cities.

=== Blekinge ===
| Location | Share | Votes | S | AV | F | B | K/V | Left | Right |
|---|---|---|---|---|---|---|---|---|---|
| Bräkne | 16.4 | 6,681 | 42.0 | 31.1 | 10.2 | 14.9 | 1.8 | 43.8 | 56.2 |
| Karlshamn | 5.9 | 2,405 | 40.0 | 39.5 | 17.8 | 0.3 | 2.4 | 42.4 | 57.6 |
| Karlskrona | 17.4 | 7,078 | 45.4 | 36.0 | 18.6 | 0.0 | 0.0 | 45.4 | 54.6 |
| Lister | 18.3 | 7,471 | 34.0 | 31.9 | 22.1 | 9.0 | 3.0 | 37.0 | 63.0 |
| Medelstad | 22.0 | 8,959 | 44.5 | 23.8 | 14.1 | 12.3 | 5.2 | 49.7 | 50.3 |
| Ronneby | 2.9 | 1,176 | 40.3 | 35.3 | 21.7 | 0.3 | 2.4 | 42.7 | 57.3 |
| Sölvesborg | 3.0 | 1,236 | 43.8 | 29.0 | 24.4 | 0.0 | 2.8 | 46.6 | 53.4 |
| Östra | 13.9 | 5,665 | 37.9 | 24.8 | 27.4 | 8.8 | 1.0 | 39.0 | 61.0 |
| Postal vote | 0.3 | 102 | | | | | | | |
| Total | 2.3 | 40,773 | 40.9 | 30.3 | 18.3 | 8.1 | 2.4 | 43.4 | 56.6 |
Source: SCB

=== Gothenburg and Bohuslän ===
==== Bohuslän ====
| Location | Share | Votes | S | AV | F | B | K/V | Left | Right |
|---|---|---|---|---|---|---|---|---|---|
| Askim | 10.8 | 5,884 | 56.8 | 15.6 | 12.0 | 13.0 | 2.6 | 59.4 | 40.6 |
| Bullaren | 0.9 | 485 | 4.1 | 75.3 | 17.5 | 3.1 | 0.0 | 4.1 | 95.9 |
| Inlands Fräkne | 2.7 | 1,475 | 12.1 | 46.9 | 28.3 | 12.7 | 0.0 | 12.1 | 87.9 |
| Inlands Nordre | 5.2 | 2,856 | 9.8 | 51.2 | 21.2 | 17.8 | 0.0 | 9.8 | 90.2 |
| Inlands Södre | 3.7 | 2,032 | 7.1 | 53.8 | 8.7 | 30.4 | 0.0 | 7.1 | 92.9 |
| Inlands Torpe | 2.3 | 1,240 | 56.5 | 18.4 | 7.1 | 18.0 | 0.1 | 56.5 | 43.5 |
| Kungälv | 1.4 | 741 | 42.4 | 51.0 | 6.2 | 0.4 | 0.0 | 42.4 | 57.6 |
| Kville | 3.2 | 1,753 | 26.9 | 31.0 | 27.0 | 15.0 | 0.0 | 26.9 | 73.1 |
| Lane | 4.0 | 2,159 | 14.1 | 54.9 | 20.9 | 10.1 | 0.1 | 14.2 | 85.8 |
| Lysekil | 2.7 | 1,494 | 37.8 | 52.6 | 7.3 | 0.1 | 2.2 | 40.0 | 60.0 |
| Marstrand | 0.5 | 289 | 13.5 | 41.9 | 44.6 | 0.0 | 0.0 | 13.5 | 86.5 |
| Orust Västra | 5.1 | 2,760 | 2.4 | 65.3 | 25.2 | 7.2 | 0.0 | 2.4 | 97.6 |
| Orust Östra | 2.1 | 1,138 | 10.6 | 51.0 | 28.3 | 10.1 | 0.0 | 10.6 | 89.4 |
| Sotenäs | 5.9 | 3,236 | 43.6 | 21.2 | 29.9 | 0.5 | 4.8 | 48.3 | 51.7 |
| Strömstad | 1.2 | 664 | 28.2 | 43.1 | 27.4 | 0.0 | 1.4 | 29.5 | 70.5 |
| Stångenäs | 5.3 | 2,879 | 40.8 | 43.7 | 13.4 | 2.1 | 0.0 | 40.8 | 59.2 |
| Sävedal | 12.9 | 7,057 | 71.6 | 14.3 | 5.6 | 5.7 | 2.7 | 74.3 | 25.7 |
| Sörbygden | 2.5 | 1,393 | 0.4 | 86.4 | 4.2 | 9.0 | 0.0 | 0.4 | 99.6 |
| Tanum | 3.6 | 1,941 | 17.5 | 55.8 | 18.7 | 8.0 | 0.0 | 17.5 | 82.5 |
| Tjörn | 2.3 | 1,249 | 6.6 | 22.7 | 52.2 | 18.6 | 0.0 | 6.6 | 93.4 |
| Tunge | 3.9 | 2,154 | 42.4 | 34.8 | 16.4 | 6.3 | 0.0 | 42.5 | 57.5 |
| Uddevalla | 8.1 | 4,432 | 46.6 | 32.2 | 19.6 | 0.0 | 1.6 | 48.1 | 51.9 |
| Vette | 3.5 | 1,899 | 43.2 | 26.9 | 17.0 | 10.2 | 2.7 | 46.0 | 54.0 |
| Västra Hising | 5.8 | 3,194 | 13.3 | 35.5 | 22.0 | 28.1 | 1.1 | 14.3 | 85.6 |
| Östra Hising | 0.4 | 228 | 10.1 | 3.1 | 0.9 | 85.5 | 0.4 | 10.5 | 89.5 |
| Postal vote | 0.0 | 13 | | | | | | | |
| Total | 3.1 | 54,645 | 34.9 | 36.2 | 17.5 | 10.1 | 1.3 | 36.1 | 63.9 |
Source: SCB

==== Gothenburg ====
| Location | Share | Votes | S | AV | F | K/V | Left | Right |
|---|---|---|---|---|---|---|---|---|
| Gothenburg | 100.0 | 65,360 | 54.3 | 27.5 | 13.5 | 4.7 | 59.0 | 41.0 |
| Total | 3.8 | 65,360 | 54.3 | 27.5 | 13.5 | 4.7 | 59.0 | 41.0 |
Source: SCB

=== Gotland ===
| Location | Share | Votes | S | AV | F | B | Left | Right |
|---|---|---|---|---|---|---|---|---|
| Gotland Norra | 40.7 | 6,296 | 15.0 | 16.6 | 10.3 | 58.0 | 15.0 | 84.9 |
| Gotland Södra | 44.1 | 6,820 | 6.8 | 16.2 | 21.3 | 55.6 | 6.8 | 93.2 |
| Visby | 3.2 | 2,351 | 38.1 | 47.3 | 12.6 | 2.0 | 38.1 | 61.9 |
| Total | 0.9 | 15,467 | 14.9 | 21.1 | 15.5 | 48.4 | 14.9 | 85.0 |
Source: SCB

=== Gävleborg ===
| Location | Share | Votes | S | AV | F | B | K/V | Left | Right |
|---|---|---|---|---|---|---|---|---|---|
| Ala | 10.1 | 8,113 | 52.8 | 3.3 | 11.1 | 16.4 | 16.4 | 69.2 | 30.8 |
| Arbrå-Järvsö | 4.7 | 3,788 | 35.2 | 6.4 | 28.6 | 19.3 | 10.5 | 45.7 | 54.3 |
| Bergsjö-Forsa | 9.3 | 7,507 | 37.0 | 5.8 | 17.7 | 28.3 | 11.3 | 48.3 | 51.7 |
| Bollnäs ting | 13.7 | 11,017 | 45.3 | 6.3 | 19.2 | 18.0 | 11.2 | 56.5 | 43.5 |
| Delsbo | 3.6 | 2,877 | 36.8 | 7.5 | 6.8 | 40.1 | 8.8 | 45.5 | 54.5 |
| Enånger | 2.6 | 2,130 | 40.8 | 4.8 | 15.5 | 20.8 | 17.9 | 58.8 | 41.2 |
| Gästrikland Västra | 11.7 | 9,441 | 28.2 | 5.7 | 17.2 | 15.0 | 33.9 | 62.0 | 38.0 |
| Gästrikland Östra | 14.9 | 12,039 | 34.8 | 5.3 | 19.6 | 7.8 | 32.4 | 67.2 | 32.8 |
| Gävle | 15.0 | 12,119 | 45.7 | 17.0 | 20.8 | 0.1 | 16.5 | 62.2 | 37.8 |
| Hudiksvall | 2.5 | 1,997 | 29.9 | 26.3 | 20.4 | 1.5 | 21.9 | 51.9 | 48.1 |
| Ljusdal | 7.0 | 5,638 | 47.3 | 8.1 | 13.6 | 12.0 | 19.0 | 66.3 | 33.7 |
| Söderhamn | 4.8 | 3,904 | 56.9 | 20.2 | 11.3 | 0.0 | 11.6 | 68.5 | 31.5 |
| Postal vote | 0.0 | 38 | | | | | | | |
| Total | 4.6 | 80,608 | 41.2 | 8.6 | 17.5 | 13.4 | 19.3 | 60.4 | 39.6 |
Source: SCB

=== Halland ===
| Location | Share | Votes | S | AV | F | B | Left | Right |
|---|---|---|---|---|---|---|---|---|
| Falkenberg | 3.4 | 1,592 | 38.4 | 43.9 | 16.6 | 1.1 | 38.4 | 61.6 |
| Faurås | 11.4 | 5,323 | 13.7 | 45.9 | 8.0 | 32.4 | 13.7 | 86.3 |
| Fjäre | 11.7 | 5,477 | 14.3 | 30.0 | 3.3 | 52.5 | 14.3 | 85.7 |
| Halmstad | 14.4 | 6,718 | 50.8 | 32.4 | 16.6 | 0.6 | 50.8 | 49.2 |
| Halmstad hundred | 11.2 | 5,237 | 34.6 | 38.1 | 12.9 | 14.5 | 34.6 | 65.4 |
| Himle | 7.9 | 3,665 | 10.1 | 40.9 | 21.6 | 46.8 | 10.1 | 89.8 |
| Hök | 10.4 | 4,860 | 18.4 | 23.7 | 13.4 | 44.5 | 18.4 | 81.6 |
| Kungsbacka | 1.3 | 584 | 28.1 | 56.7 | 14.4 | 0.9 | 28.1 | 71.9 |
| Laholm | 1.6 | 738 | 33.5 | 37.0 | 14.4 | 15.2 | 33.5 | 66.5 |
| Tönnersjö | 9.6 | 4,453 | 54.6 | 27.2 | 13.7 | 4.5 | 54.6 | 45.4 |
| Varberg | 5.0 | 2,334 | 45.5 | 35.8 | 18.6 | 0.2 | 45.5 | 54.5 |
| Viske | 3.7 | 1,713 | 8.5 | 27.6 | 17.0 | 46.8 | 8.5 | 91.5 |
| Årstad | 8.4 | 3,916 | 18.6 | 55.4 | 3.5 | 22.5 | 18.6 | 81.4 |
| Total | 2.7 | 46,620 | 28.7 | 36.3 | 12.4 | 22.7 | 28.7 | 71.3 |
Source: SCB

=== Jämtland ===
| Location | Share | Votes | S | AV | F | B | K/V | Left | Right |
|---|---|---|---|---|---|---|---|---|---|
| Berg | 4.9 | 1,817 | 9.5 | 15.3 | 43.6 | 14.7 | 16.8 | 26.3 | 73.7 |
| Hammerdal | 11.4 | 4,223 | 15.0 | 16.0 | 25.4 | 27.3 | 16.3 | 31.3 | 68.7 |
| Hede | 3.3 | 1,241 | 2.4 | 8.7 | 46.3 | 7.5 | 35.1 | 37.5 | 62.5 |
| Lits-Rödön | 17.1 | 6,329 | 16.2 | 9.2 | 41.2 | 24.6 | 8.8 | 24.9 | 75.1 |
| Ragunda | 10.9 | 4,050 | 16.8 | 11.6 | 18.3 | 25.4 | 27.9 | 44.7 | 55.3 |
| Revsund-Brunflo-Näs | 13.8 | 5,111 | 14.5 | 16.0 | 35.3 | 16.8 | 17.5 | 32.0 | 68.0 |
| Sunne-Oviken-Hallen | 8.8 | 3,272 | 10.9 | 10.6 | 50.1 | 24.0 | 4.3 | 15.3 | 84.7 |
| Sveg | 5.8 | 2,168 | 10.1 | 14.9 | 27.6 | 8.4 | 38.9 | 49.0 | 51.0 |
| Undersåker-Offerdal | 13.2 | 4,897 | 18.6 | 11.4 | 39.3 | 20.1 | 10.7 | 29.3 | 70.7 |
| Östersund | 10.8 | 3,998 | 24.3 | 37.0 | 25.8 | 4.0 | 8.9 | 33.2 | 66.8 |
| Total | 2.1 | 37,106 | 15.5 | 15.2 | 34.4 | 19.1 | 15.8 | 31.3 | 68.7 |
Source: SCB

=== Jönköping ===
| Location | Share | Votes | S | AV | F | B | K/V | Left | Right |
|---|---|---|---|---|---|---|---|---|---|
| Eksjö | 2.8 | 2,085 | 19.9 | 41.3 | 28.1 | 0.9 | 9.8 | 29.7 | 70.3 |
| Gränna | 0.6 | 432 | 11.1 | 67.4 | 20.6 | 0.0 | 0.9 | 12.0 | 88.0 |
| Huskvarna | 3.8 | 2,796 | 36.2 | 32.2 | 12.8 | 0.0 | 18.9 | 55.0 | 45.0 |
| Jönköping | 12.5 | 9,231 | 30.4 | 38.2 | 26.1 | 0.0 | 5.4 | 35.7 | 64.3 |
| Mo | 3.5 | 2,627 | 6.2 | 54.8 | 22.7 | 15.3 | 1.0 | 7.2 | 92.8 |
| Norra Vedbo | 6.2 | 4,591 | 11.7 | 47.7 | 22.6 | 12.7 | 5.3 | 17.0 | 83.0 |
| Nässjö | 3.8 | 2,827 | 44.5 | 22.6 | 22.0 | 0.3 | 10.6 | 55.1 | 44.9 |
| Södra Vedbo | 7.0 | 5,203 | 17.5 | 24.9 | 19.4 | 28.0 | 10.1 | 27.6 | 72.4 |
| Tranås | 2.6 | 1,941 | 24.0 | 31.2 | 31.2 | 0.3 | 13.3 | 37.3 | 62.7 |
| Tveta | 9.3 | 6,859 | 23.3 | 44.6 | 17.7 | 6.2 | 8.2 | 31.5 | 68.5 |
| Vetlanda | 1.6 | 1,198 | 37.1 | 31.2 | 20.6 | 1.2 | 9.9 | 47.0 | 53.0 |
| Vista | 3.1 | 2,287 | 3.5 | 80.2 | 11.5 | 2.8 | 2.0 | 5.5 | 94.5 |
| Värnamo | 1.4 | 1,022 | 28.3 | 41.9 | 22.0 | 0.0 | 7.8 | 36.1 | 63.9 |
| Västbo | 13.4 | 9,940 | 11.8 | 32.7 | 17.7 | 31.1 | 6.7 | 18.6 | 81.4 |
| Västra | 10.7 | 7,966 | 15.5 | 30.7 | 20.9 | 30.1 | 2.7 | 18.2 | 81.7 |
| Östbo | 8.9 | 6,579 | 12.4 | 56.5 | 13.8 | 14.2 | 3.2 | 15.6 | 84.4 |
| Östra | 8.7 | 6,467 | 19.3 | 19.4 | 25.1 | 31.5 | 4.7 | 24.0 | 76.0 |
| Postal vote | 0.1 | 60 | | | | | | | |
| Total | 4.3 | 74,111 | 19.6 | 38.0 | 20.5 | 15.4 | 6.5 | 26.0 | 73.9 |
Source: SCB

=== Kalmar ===
| Location | Share | Votes | S | AV | F | B | K/V | Left | Right |
|---|---|---|---|---|---|---|---|---|---|
| Algutsrum | 2.6 | 1,571 | 17.4 | 50.5 | 4.6 | 26.7 | 0.8 | 18.2 | 81.8 |
| Aspeland | 6.2 | 3,762 | 17.1 | 54.2 | 15.8 | 4.6 | 8.3 | 25.4 | 74.6 |
| Borgholm | 0.7 | 404 | 15.1 | 31.2 | 48.0 | 5.0 | 0.7 | 15.8 | 84.2 |
| Gräsgård | 2.4 | 1,474 | 34.7 | 37.3 | 9.4 | 18.5 | 0.1 | 34.7 | 65.3 |
| Handbörd | 6.1 | 3,752 | 31.1 | 53.6 | 6.5 | 2.7 | 6.2 | 37.2 | 62.8 |
| Kalmar | 8.0 | 4,870 | 40.2 | 44.7 | 12.8 | 0.1 | 2.1 | 42.3 | 57.7 |
| Möckleby | 1.4 | 877 | 2.7 | 79.4 | 1.0 | 16.9 | 0.0 | 2.7 | 97.3 |
| Norra Möre | 5.2 | 3,198 | 29.2 | 57.3 | 6.0 | 6.8 | 0.7 | 30.0 | 70.0 |
| Norra Tjust | 7.0 | 4,308 | 17.6 | 54.5 | 11.4 | 5.8 | 10.7 | 28.3 | 71.7 |
| Oskarshamn | 4.1 | 2,478 | 48.9 | 28.4 | 14.0 | 0.1 | 8.5 | 57.4 | 42.5 |
| Runsten | 1.9 | 1,135 | 2.3 | 26.4 | 4.9 | 66.0 | 0.4 | 2.6 | 97.4 |
| Sevede | 7.1 | 4,321 | 9.6 | 53.7 | 13.6 | 13.0 | 10.2 | 19.8 | 80.2 |
| Slättbo | 1.5 | 938 | 10.3 | 23.5 | 4.2 | 57.4 | 4.7 | 15.0 | 85.0 |
| Stranda | 6.5 | 3,990 | 30.2 | 36.3 | 13.1 | 11.0 | 9.3 | 39.5 | 60.4 |
| Södra Möre | 16.5 | 10,076 | 25.2 | 45.0 | 14.6 | 12.4 | 2.9 | 28.0 | 72.0 |
| Södra Tjust | 9.5 | 5,780 | 19.6 | 43.4 | 14.6 | 11.2 | 11.1 | 30.8 | 69.2 |
| Tunalän | 4.5 | 2,755 | 9.7 | 61.0 | 13.9 | 8.6 | 6.8 | 16.5 | 83.5 |
| Vimmerby | 1.2 | 737 | 12.6 | 55.5 | 25.8 | 3.1 | 3.0 | 15.6 | 84.4 |
| Västervik | 5.0 | 3,054 | 22.3 | 36.3 | 23.4 | 0.0 | 17.8 | 40.1 | 59.8 |
| Åkerbo | 2.7 | 1,642 | 6.2 | 10.4 | 2.9 | 80.1 | 0.4 | 6.6 | 93.4 |
| Postal vote | 0.0 | 5 | | | | | | | |
| Total | 3.5 | 61,127 | 23.1 | 45.8 | 12.7 | 12.1 | 3.5 | 29.5 | 70.5 |
Source: SCB

=== Kopparberg ===
| Location | Share | Votes | S | AV | F | B | K/V | Left | Right |
|---|---|---|---|---|---|---|---|---|---|
| Avesta | 2.3 | 1,698 | 46.9 | 9.1 | 15.4 | 0.0 | 28.6 | 75.4 | 24.6 |
| Falu Norra | 9.3 | 6,969 | 32.5 | 8.4 | 27.8 | 11.7 | 19.6 | 52.1 | 47.8 |
| Falu Södra | 13.1 | 9,783 | 40.6 | 5.9 | 16.7 | 17.2 | 19.6 | 60.2 | 39.8 |
| Falun | 4.3 | 3,241 | 41.2 | 29.6 | 23.5 | 0.3 | 5.4 | 46.6 | 53.4 |
| Folkare | 7.1 | 5,312 | 44.9 | 13.3 | 15.3 | 17.2 | 9.2 | 54.2 | 45.8 |
| Hedemora | 1.4 | 1,069 | 34.7 | 23.8 | 34.3 | 3.8 | 3.4 | 38.1 | 61.9 |
| Hedemora | 8.1 | 6,077 | 39.3 | 6.3 | 12.8 | 32.7 | 8.9 | 48.2 | 51.8 |
| Leksand-Gagnef | 10.2 | 7,640 | 18.1 | 5.0 | 48.3 | 13.7 | 15.0 | 33.1 | 66.9 |
| Ludvika | 2.1 | 1,548 | 55.0 | 16.3 | 13.0 | 0.4 | 15.2 | 70.3 | 29.7 |
| Malung | 4.6 | 3,423 | 32.9 | 6.6 | 42.1 | 7.7 | 10.5 | 43.4 | 56.4 |
| Mora | 6.9 | 5,186 | 25.7 | 7.5 | 52.4 | 5.5 | 9.1 | 34.7 | 65.3 |
| Nås | 6.2 | 4,656 | 34.6 | 6.0 | 14.4 | 19.0 | 26.0 | 60.6 | 39.4 |
| Orsa | 2.6 | 1,932 | 29.2 | 10.6 | 34.3 | 16.7 | 9.2 | 38.4 | 61.6 |
| Rättvik | 4.7 | 3,531 | 12.7 | 6.3 | 41.5 | 17.1 | 22.5 | 35.1 | 64.9 |
| Särna-Idre | 0.7 | 509 | 10.4 | 16.7 | 50.7 | 0.0 | 22.2 | 32.6 | 67.4 |
| Säter | 0.8 | 585 | 60.9 | 13.7 | 20.3 | 0.3 | 4.8 | 65.6 | 34.4 |
| Västerbergslag | 13.6 | 10,167 | 53.6 | 6.5 | 11.5 | 8.7 | 19.6 | 73.3 | 26.7 |
| Älvdalen | 1.9 | 1,420 | 27.4 | 14.2 | 41.0 | 4.5 | 13.0 | 40.4 | 59.6 |
| Postal vote | 0.0 | 23 | | | | | | | |
| Total | 4.3 | 74,769 | 36.2 | 8.8 | 26.1 | 13.1 | 15.7 | 51.9 | 48.1 |
Source: SCB

=== Kristianstad ===
| Location | Share | Votes | S | AV | F | B | K/V | Left | Right |
|---|---|---|---|---|---|---|---|---|---|
| Albo | 3.8 | 2,674 | 22.4 | 16.8 | 49.6 | 8.1 | 3.2 | 25.6 | 74.4 |
| Bjäre | 5.7 | 3,997 | 22.6 | 53.9 | 7.8 | 15.7 | 0.1 | 22.7 | 77.3 |
| Gärd | 11.0 | 7,691 | 43.3 | 15.5 | 38.0 | 2.0 | 1.2 | 44.5 | 55.5 |
| Hässleholm | 1.6 | 1,125 | 49.4 | 29.4 | 20.1 | 0.1 | 1.0 | 50.4 | 49.6 |
| Ingelstad | 10.8 | 7,542 | 35.4 | 19.1 | 35.5 | 9.7 | 0.3 | 35.7 | 64.3 |
| Järrestad | 3.6 | 2,542 | 40.0 | 18.1 | 31.1 | 10.5 | 0.4 | 40.4 | 59.6 |
| Kristianstad | 5.3 | 3,742 | 38.7 | 36.7 | 22.7 | 0.0 | 1.8 | 40.5 | 59.5 |
| Norra Åsbo | 11.0 | 7,710 | 34.3 | 36.8 | 15.4 | 12.9 | 0.5 | 34.9 | 65.1 |
| Simrishamn | 1.2 | 837 | 46.6 | 37.2 | 16.2 | 0.0 | 0.0 | 46.6 | 53.4 |
| Södra Åsbo | 7.4 | 5,198 | 48.0 | 31.9 | 5.7 | 13.8 | 0.5 | 48.6 | 51.4 |
| Villand | 10.1 | 7,054 | 39.9 | 24.1 | 24.7 | 3.2 | 8.2 | 48.1 | 51.9 |
| Västra Göinge | 13.6 | 9,511 | 26.1 | 22.1 | 40.4 | 10.3 | 1.0 | 27.2 | 72.8 |
| Ängelholm | 2.8 | 1,936 | 58.6 | 36.0 | 4.5 | 0.3 | 0.7 | 59.2 | 40.8 |
| Östra Göinge | 11.9 | 8,367 | 36.5 | 24.3 | 30.1 | 6.4 | 2.7 | 39.2 | 60.8 |
| Postal vote | 0.1 | 92 | | | | | | | |
| Total | 4.0 | 70,018 | 36.5 | 26.8 | 27.0 | 7.8 | 1.8 | 38.4 | 61.6 |
Source: SCB

=== Kronoberg ===
| Location | Share | Votes | S | AV | F | B | K/V | Left | Right |
|---|---|---|---|---|---|---|---|---|---|
| Allbo | 19.6 | 8,907 | 25.5 | 43.9 | 12.8 | 15.8 | 2.0 | 27.5 | 72.5 |
| Kinnevald | 10.8 | 4,890 | 16.3 | 53.7 | 10.6 | 16.9 | 2.5 | 18.8 | 81.2 |
| Konga | 18.5 | 8,393 | 29.0 | 37.4 | 11.7 | 16.9 | 5.0 | 34.1 | 65.9 |
| Norrvidinge | 5.4 | 2,473 | 17.8 | 38.7 | 12.7 | 29.8 | 0.9 | 18.7 | 81.3 |
| Sunnerbo | 23.9 | 10,855 | 18.7 | 46.1 | 21.5 | 11.1 | 2.6 | 21.3 | 78.7 |
| Uppvidinge | 16.3 | 7,423 | 36.4 | 22.6 | 13.3 | 19.7 | 8.0 | 44.4 | 55.6 |
| Växjö | 5.5 | 2,514 | 30.3 | 44.2 | 17.9 | 0.2 | 7.4 | 37.6 | 62.3 |
| Postal vote | 0.0 | 9 | | | | | | | |
| Total | 2.6 | 45,464 | 25.2 | 40.5 | 14.8 | 15.5 | 4.0 | 29.2 | 70.8 |
Source: SCB

=== Malmöhus ===
==== Malmö area ====
| Location | Share | Votes | S | AV | F | K/V | Left | Right |
|---|---|---|---|---|---|---|---|---|
| Hälsingborg | 26.1 | 18,322 | 53.7 | 39.1 | 5.6 | 1.7 | 55.4 | 44.6 |
| Landskrona | 9.0 | 6,345 | 70.4 | 26.0 | 3.3 | 0.3 | 70.7 | 29.3 |
| Lund | 11.2 | 7,850 | 54.4 | 41.2 | 4.3 | 0.0 | 54.5 | 45.5 |
| Malmö | 53.5 | 37,580 | 63.5 | 30.6 | 4.9 | 1.1 | 64.5 | 35.5 |
| Postal vote | 0.1 | 89 | | | | | | |
| Total | 4.0 | 70,186 | 60.5 | 33.6 | 4.9 | 1.1 | 61.6 | 38.4 |
Source: SCB

==== Malmöhus County ====
| Location | Share | Votes | S | AV | F | B | K/V | Left | Right |
|---|---|---|---|---|---|---|---|---|---|
| Bara | 8.3 | 8,023 | 64.3 | 19.3 | 4.7 | 11.4 | 0.2 | 64.5 | 35.5 |
| Eslöv | 2.2 | 2,123 | 54.2 | 36.8 | 7.3 | 0.8 | 0.9 | 55.1 | 44.9 |
| Frosta | 8.2 | 7,862 | 30.1 | 14.1 | 33.8 | 21.3 | 0.7 | 30.8 | 69.2 |
| Färs | 7.2 | 6,923 | 32.9 | 9.3 | 34.0 | 23.4 | 0.4 | 33.3 | 66.7 |
| Harjager | 4.9 | 4,668 | 52.9 | 19.5 | 5.1 | 20.8 | 1.8 | 54.6 | 45.4 |
| Herrestad | 2.8 | 2,726 | 59.6 | 8.8 | 18.7 | 12.8 | 0.1 | 59.7 | 40.3 |
| Ljunit | 2.3 | 2,190 | 52.2 | 13.2 | 20.1 | 14.6 | 0.0 | 52.2 | 47.8 |
| Luggude | 16.8 | 16,130 | 58.0 | 12.2 | 4.8 | 24.6 | 0.4 | 58.4 | 41.6 |
| Onsjö | 5.9 | 5,650 | 44.5 | 9.7 | 6.4 | 38.4 | 1.0 | 45.4 | 54.5 |
| Oxie | 8.1 | 7,775 | 62.9 | 18.3 | 4.7 | 13.4 | 0.6 | 63.6 | 36.4 |
| Rönneberg | 4.9 | 4,726 | 55.3 | 19.4 | 4.3 | 20.4 | 0.5 | 55.8 | 44.2 |
| Skanör-Falsterbo | 0.2 | 226 | 28.3 | 51.3 | 15.9 | 4.4 | 0.0 | 28.3 | 71.7 |
| Skytt | 5.1 | 4,917 | 48.0 | 28.8 | 10.0 | 11.9 | 1.3 | 49.3 | 50.7 |
| Torna | 7.5 | 7,217 | 49.3 | 15.7 | 8.1 | 26.8 | 0.1 | 49.4 | 50.6 |
| Trälleborg | 3.7 | 3,564 | 57.2 | 24.2 | 11.3 | 0.2 | 7.1 | 64.3 | 35.7 |
| Vemmenhög | 7.8 | 7,512 | 50.7 | 15.8 | 14.8 | 18.6 | 0.1 | 50.8 | 49.2 |
| Ystad | 4.0 | 3,884 | 66.2 | 22.3 | 11.3 | 0.1 | 0.1 | 66.3 | 33.7 |
| Postal vote | 0.0 | 24 | | | | | | | |
| Total | 5.5 | 96,140 | 52.0 | 16.6 | 12.0 | 18.7 | 0.8 | 52.7 | 47.3 |
Source: SCB

=== Norrbotten ===
| Location | Share | Votes | S | AV | F | B | K/V | Left | Right |
|---|---|---|---|---|---|---|---|---|---|
| Arjeplog | 0.9 | 353 | 11.3 | 24.1 | 31.4 | 0.0 | 33.1 | 44.5 | 55.5 |
| Arvidsjaur | 3.5 | 1,339 | 2.8 | 35.3 | 19.6 | 0.1 | 42.0 | 44.9 | 55.1 |
| Boden | 4.0 | 1,497 | 14.6 | 33.9 | 11.2 | 0.3 | 40.0 | 54.6 | 45.4 |
| Gällivare | 10.1 | 3,828 | 7.7 | 32.7 | 7.2 | 1.8 | 50.6 | 58.3 | 41.7 |
| Haparanda | 1.6 | 587 | 7.7 | 54.9 | 15.8 | 0.0 | 21.6 | 29.3 | 70.7 |
| Jokkmokk | 3.1 | 1,171 | 3.1 | 19.7 | 12.8 | 0.2 | 64.2 | 67.3 | 32.7 |
| Jukkasjärvi | 7.4 | 2,804 | 13.2 | 18.7 | 6.5 | 0.9 | 60.7 | 73.9 | 26.1 |
| Karesuando | 0.1 | 34 | 0.0 | 94.1 | 0.0 | 0.0 | 5.9 | 5.9 | 94.1 |
| Korpilombolo | 0.5 | 204 | 2.9 | 55.4 | 9.3 | 18.1 | 14.2 | 17.2 | 82.8 |
| Luleå | 7.4 | 2,790 | 7.8 | 38.8 | 8.9 | 0.0 | 44.4 | 52.3 | 47.7 |
| Nederkalix | 10.6 | 3,989 | 4.2 | 32.3 | 9.7 | 16.4 | 37.4 | 41.6 | 58.4 |
| Nederluleå | 8.9 | 3,361 | 3.1 | 30.8 | 23.6 | 20.0 | 22.6 | 25.7 | 74.3 |
| Pajala | 0.9 | 342 | 1.2 | 26.3 | 17.8 | 48.5 | 6.1 | 7.3 | 92.7 |
| Piteå | 2.2 | 849 | 6.2 | 45.9 | 26.9 | 0.2 | 20.7 | 27.0 | 73.0 |
| Piteå ting | 13.1 | 4,961 | 10.4 | 27.9 | 22.7 | 10.1 | 28.9 | 39.3 | 60.7 |
| Råneå | 6.2 | 2,337 | 5.8 | 28.1 | 23.0 | 12.0 | 31.2 | 37.0 | 63.0 |
| Torneå | 5.0 | 1,892 | 3.3 | 28.6 | 24.9 | 12.7 | 30.4 | 33.7 | 66.3 |
| Älvsby | 3.9 | 1,490 | 3.2 | 16.2 | 22.6 | 21.7 | 36.2 | 39.5 | 60.5 |
| Överkalix | 3.1 | 1,153 | 3.3 | 14.1 | 12.3 | 35.2 | 35.1 | 38.4 | 61.6 |
| Överluleå | 7.3 | 2,759 | 5.4 | 17.0 | 24.4 | 15.3 | 37.8 | 43.3 | 56.7 |
| Postal vote | 0.1 | 44 | | | | | | | |
| Total | 2.2 | 37,784 | 6.7 | 28.8 | 16.6 | 10.1 | 37.8 | 44.5 | 55.5 |
Source: SCB

=== Skaraborg ===
| Location | Share | Votes | S | AV | F | B | K/V | Left | Right |
|---|---|---|---|---|---|---|---|---|---|
| Barne | 5.6 | 3,666 | 7.4 | 48.2 | 23.9 | 20.0 | 0.5 | 7.9 | 92.1 |
| Falköping | 2.7 | 1,788 | 34.1 | 28.7 | 25.6 | 0.4 | 11.1 | 45.2 | 54.8 |
| Frökind | 1.4 | 904 | 7.1 | 55.6 | 10.4 | 26.4 | 0.4 | 7.5 | 92.5 |
| Gudhem | 4.9 | 3,260 | 23.3 | 32.0 | 17.2 | 21.6 | 5.9 | 29.2 | 70.8 |
| Hjo | 1.3 | 855 | 20.8 | 46.8 | 26.8 | 3.2 | 2.5 | 23.3 | 76.7 |
| Kinne | 4.9 | 3,228 | 23.1 | 20.9 | 36.5 | 9.5 | 10.0 | 33.1 | 66.9 |
| Kinnefjärding | 3.2 | 2,100 | 15.8 | 31.6 | 25.1 | 24.7 | 2.8 | 18.5 | 81.5 |
| Kåkind | 5.8 | 3,821 | 16.5 | 22.8 | 22.0 | 34.1 | 4.5 | 21.0 | 79.0 |
| Kålland | 4.8 | 3,182 | 10.2 | 36.8 | 28.5 | 23.2 | 1.3 | 11.5 | 88.5 |
| Laske | 2.0 | 1,320 | 5.5 | 38.3 | 27.0 | 26.6 | 2.6 | 8.0 | 92.0 |
| Lidköping | 3.5 | 2,308 | 37.8 | 30.5 | 16.8 | 0.8 | 14.1 | 51.9 | 48.1 |
| Mariestad | 2.5 | 1,627 | 37.7 | 42.2 | 14.9 | 0.3 | 4.9 | 42.5 | 57.5 |
| Skara | 2.5 | 1,677 | 20.3 | 34.9 | 35.5 | 0.8 | 8.5 | 28.8 | 71.2 |
| Skåning | 5.3 | 3,509 | 11.8 | 27.5 | 29.9 | 29.6 | 1.2 | 13.0 | 87.0 |
| Skövde | 3.8 | 2,480 | 30.6 | 43.3 | 16.4 | 1.4 | 8.3 | 38.8 | 61.2 |
| Tidaholm | 1.9 | 1,242 | 35.8 | 19.8 | 22.9 | 0.1 | 21.3 | 57.2 | 42.8 |
| Vadsbo | 20.8 | 13,695 | 27.9 | 26.5 | 17.9 | 25.6 | 2.1 | 30.0 | 70.0 |
| Valle | 2.2 | 1,447 | 27.3 | 28.7 | 20.5 | 19.5 | 4.0 | 31.3 | 68.7 |
| Vartofta | 10.9 | 7,176 | 17.5 | 27.9 | 16.1 | 33.5 | 5.0 | 22.4 | 77.6 |
| Vilske | 3.1 | 2,018 | 8.4 | 41.4 | 12.0 | 36.5 | 1.7 | 10.1 | 89.9 |
| Viste | 4.5 | 2,945 | 9.8 | 58.5 | 21.2 | 9.4 | 1.0 | 10.8 | 89.2 |
| Åse | 2.4 | 1,613 | 20.5 | 46.2 | 21.5 | 11.8 | 0.0 | 20.5 | 79.5 |
| Postal vote | 0.0 | 21 | | | | | | | |
| Total | 3.8 | 65,882 | 20.8 | 33.0 | 21.4 | 20.4 | 4.4 | 25.2 | 74.8 |
Source: SCB

=== Stockholm ===
==== Stockholm (city) ====
| Location | Share | Votes | S | AV | F | K | SV | Other | Left | Right |
|---|---|---|---|---|---|---|---|---|---|---|
| Stockholm | 100.0 | 146,858 | 45.5 | 32.9 | 9.8 | 6.4 | 0.6 | 4.9 | 52.5 | 42.7 |
| Total | 8.4 | 146,858 | 45.5 | 32.9 | 9.8 | 6.4 | 0.6 | 4.9 | 52.5 | 42.7 |
Source: SCB

==== Stockholm County ====
| Location | Share | Votes | S | AV | F | B | K/V | Left | Right |
|---|---|---|---|---|---|---|---|---|---|
| Bro-Vätö | 1.5 | 1,043 | 32.7 | 46.3 | 10.9 | 6.6 | 3.4 | 36.0 | 63.9 |
| Danderyd | 15.0 | 10,087 | 51.0 | 26.3 | 12.2 | 0.3 | 10.2 | 61.1 | 38.9 |
| Djursholm | 2.4 | 1,581 | 27.6 | 56.2 | 15.0 | 0.0 | 1.2 | 28.8 | 71.2 |
| Färentuna | 3.2 | 2,137 | 54.0 | 7.4 | 11.2 | 25.8 | 1.5 | 55.5 | 44.5 |
| Frösåker | 5.4 | 3,595 | 42.3 | 31.9 | 8.6 | 11.7 | 5.5 | 47.8 | 52.2 |
| Frötuna-Länna | 2.2 | 1,497 | 26.5 | 47.8 | 15.4 | 9.9 | 0.5 | 27.0 | 73.0 |
| Lyhundra | 2.3 | 1,548 | 28.4 | 46.8 | 14.0 | 9.7 | 1.1 | 29.5 | 70.5 |
| Långhundra | 1.9 | 1,249 | 40.2 | 30.3 | 15.7 | 13.1 | 0.7 | 40.9 | 59.1 |
| Norrtälje | 2.7 | 1,826 | 40.3 | 42.6 | 15.4 | 0.1 | 1.6 | 41.9 | 59.1 |
| Närdinghundra | 4.0 | 2,695 | 46.1 | 19.6 | 17.8 | 13.4 | 3.2 | 49.2 | 50.8 |
| Seminghundra | 1.6 | 1,063 | 31.1 | 20.6 | 16.2 | 31.6 | 0.5 | 31.6 | 68.4 |
| Sigtuna | 0.3 | 177 | 32.2 | 43.5 | 24.3 | 0.0 | 0.0 | 32.2 | 67.8 |
| Sjuhundra | 2.4 | 1,595 | 55.2 | 25.8 | 17.1 | 1.9 | 0.1 | 55.2 | 44.8 |
| Sollentuna | 10.0 | 6,695 | 62.6 | 14.8 | 14.7 | 0.2 | 7.8 | 70.4 | 29.6 |
| Sotholm | 6.6 | 4,396 | 48.8 | 13.6 | 16.0 | 14.9 | 6.7 | 55.5 | 44.5 |
| Svartlösa | 10.1 | 6,783 | 50.5 | 28.1 | 11.8 | 0.8 | 8.8 | 59.3 | 40.7 |
| Södertälje | 7.4 | 4,950 | 46.0 | 28.9 | 10.5 | 0.0 | 14.5 | 60.6 | 39.4 |
| Vallentuna | 2.4 | 1,635 | 53.1 | 28.7 | 10.2 | 0.2 | 7.8 | 60.9 | 39.1 |
| Vaxholm | 1.1 | 742 | 19.3 | 48.7 | 29.5 | 0.0 | 2.6 | 21.8 | 78.2 |
| Väddö-Häverö | 4.2 | 2,816 | 37.5 | 35.7 | 8.0 | 7.0 | 11.8 | 49.3 | 50.7 |
| Värmdö | 3.8 | 2,538 | 59.6 | 25.2 | 12.0 | 0.7 | 2.6 | 62.2 | 37.8 |
| Åker | 2.2 | 1,447 | 46.1 | 12.0 | 18.2 | 23.7 | 0.0 | 46.1 | 53.9 |
| Ärlinghundra | 2.5 | 1,671 | 50.0 | 14.7 | 23.2 | 11.7 | 0.5 | 50.4 | 49.6 |
| Öknebo | 4.1 | 2,762 | 56.8 | 19.3 | 13.7 | 3.0 | 7.2 | 64.0 | 36.0 |
| Öregrund | 0.3 | 229 | 41.5 | 37.1 | 21.0 | 0.0 | 0.4 | 41.9 | 58.1 |
| Östhammar | 0.5 | 322 | 19.9 | 42.5 | 37.3 | 0.0 | 0.3 | 20.2 | 79.8 |
| Postal vote | 0.0 | 29 | | | | | | | |
| Total | 3.9 | 67,108 | 47.7 | 26.4 | 13.6 | 5.7 | 6.5 | 54.2 | 45.8 |
Source:SCB

=== Södermanland ===
| Location | Share | Votes | S | AV | F | B | K/V | Left | Right |
|---|---|---|---|---|---|---|---|---|---|
| Daga | 4.6 | 2,617 | 36.5 | 18.6 | 26.3 | 16.7 | 2.1 | 38.5 | 61.5 |
| Eskilstuna | 18.4 | 10,491 | 63.2 | 15.9 | 16.6 | 0.8 | 3.4 | 66.7 | 33.3 |
| Hölebo | 2.6 | 1,480 | 43.4 | 11.2 | 24.5 | 20.9 | 0.0 | 43.4 | 56.6 |
| Jönåker | 9.7 | 5,502 | 51.2 | 12.3 | 25.8 | 5.4 | 5.4 | 56.5 | 43.5 |
| Katrineholm | 5.2 | 2,939 | 49.4 | 16.1 | 24.4 | 0.1 | 10.1 | 59.4 | 40.6 |
| Mariefred | 0.8 | 429 | 26.6 | 30.8 | 38.9 | 3.7 | 0.0 | 26.6 | 73.4 |
| Nyköping | 6.1 | 3,456 | 51.8 | 24.8 | 18.2 | 0.1 | 5.2 | 57.0 | 43.0 |
| Oppunda | 17.9 | 10,184 | 43.4 | 12.0 | 34.1 | 6.6 | 3.9 | 47.3 | 52.7 |
| Rönö | 5.3 | 3,019 | 37.7 | 13.6 | 28.0 | 18.0 | 2.7 | 40.4 | 59.6 |
| Selebo | 2.7 | 1,560 | 43.1 | 10.8 | 15.0 | 28.5 | 2.6 | 45.6 | 54.3 |
| Strängnäs | 2.3 | 1,315 | 30.6 | 51.7 | 17.0 | 0.3 | 0.4 | 31.0 | 69.0 |
| Torshälla | 1.3 | 764 | 56.0 | 20.5 | 17.3 | 3.0 | 3.1 | 59.2 | 40.8 |
| Trosa | 0.5 | 267 | 27.0 | 43.1 | 25.1 | 4.9 | 0.0 | 27.0 | 73.0 |
| Villåttinge | 8.5 | 4,857 | 45.7 | 12.8 | 27.1 | 8.5 | 5.9 | 51.6 | 48.4 |
| Västerrekarne | 4.0 | 2,285 | 34.1 | 11.0 | 45.5 | 7.4 | 2.0 | 36.1 | 63.9 |
| Åker | 4.0 | 2,282 | 46.7 | 12.2 | 26.2 | 14.5 | 0.4 | 47.1 | 52.9 |
| Österrekarne | 6.1 | 3,483 | 36.7 | 14.1 | 41.1 | 6.2 | 1.8 | 38.6 | 61.4 |
| Postal vote | 0.0 | 14 | | | | | | | |
| Total | 3.3 | 56,944 | 47.2 | 15.6 | 26.5 | 7.0 | 3.8 | 51.0 | 49.0 |
Source: SCB

=== Uppsala ===
| Location | Share | Votes | S | AV | F | B | K/V | Left | Right |
|---|---|---|---|---|---|---|---|---|---|
| Bro | 2.6 | 1,097 | 68.9 | 18.2 | 6.9 | 4.7 | 1.2 | 70.1 | 29.9 |
| Bälinge | 2.3 | 1,003 | 16.6 | 10.0 | 41.3 | 32.0 | 0.2 | 16.7 | 83.3 |
| Enköping | 3.9 | 1,691 | 43.3 | 35.2 | 13.6 | 0.9 | 6.9 | 50.3 | 49.7 |
| Hagunda | 3.5 | 1,521 | 34.1 | 17.0 | 28.0 | 18.7 | 2.2 | 36.3 | 63.7 |
| Håbo | 3.2 | 1,354 | 52.8 | 20.8 | 12.3 | 11.4 | 2.6 | 55.4 | 44.6 |
| Lagunda | 3.2 | 1,354 | 34.6 | 17.7 | 19.1 | 26.7 | 1.8 | 36.5 | 63.5 |
| Norunda | 4.6 | 1,984 | 30.5 | 9.2 | 36.3 | 20.8 | 3.1 | 33.6 | 66.4 |
| Oland | 15.8 | 6,791 | 32.9 | 10.5 | 34.2 | 13.4 | 9.1 | 42.0 | 58.0 |
| Rasbo | 2.5 | 1,083 | 38.0 | 18.9 | 28.9 | 14.0 | 0.2 | 38.1 | 61.9 |
| Trögd | 6.6 | 2,840 | 37.3 | 19.4 | 8.9 | 33.2 | 1.2 | 38.5 | 61.5 |
| Ulleråker | 3.9 | 1,678 | 44.8 | 13.4 | 23.3 | 16.9 | 1.6 | 46.4 | 53.6 |
| Uppsala | 20.5 | 8,792 | 37.5 | 39.8 | 18.7 | 0.6 | 3.4 | 40.9 | 59.1 |
| Vaksala | 2.6 | 1,133 | 37.1 | 22.4 | 18.9 | 20.6 | 1.1 | 38.1 | 61.9 |
| Åsunda | 3.8 | 1,612 | 28.5 | 21.1 | 11.4 | 34.1 | 5.0 | 33.4 | 66.6 |
| Örbyhus | 20.8 | 8,923 | 47.3 | 5.3 | 16.6 | 11.2 | 19.6 | 66.9 | 33.1 |
| Postal vote | 0.0 | 6 | | | | | | | |
| Total | 2.5 | 42,862 | 39.2 | 18.9 | 21.2 | 13.3 | 7.3 | 46.5 | 53.5 |
Source: SCB

=== Värmland ===
| Location | Share | Votes | S | AV | F | B | K/V | Left | Right |
|---|---|---|---|---|---|---|---|---|---|
| Arvika | 2.7 | 2,127 | 39.4 | 21.5 | 27.1 | 0.1 | 11.8 | 51.3 | 48.7 |
| Filipstad | 1.9 | 1,481 | 40.3 | 33.2 | 22.3 | 0.1 | 4.1 | 44.4 | 55.6 |
| Fryksdal | 11.8 | 9,337 | 27.0 | 20.3 | 35.8 | 8.9 | 8.0 | 35.0 | 65.0 |
| Färnebo | 7.8 | 6,224 | 55.8 | 6.5 | 18.8 | 1.4 | 17.5 | 73.3 | 26.7 |
| Gillberg | 5.0 | 3,980 | 28.2 | 20.8 | 36.2 | 5.6 | 9.2 | 37.5 | 62.5 |
| Grums | 3.7 | 2,938 | 49.8 | 10.2 | 23.1 | 7.1 | 9.6 | 59.5 | 40.5 |
| Jösse | 9.4 | 7,422 | 30.5 | 20.0 | 35.1 | 7.1 | 7.3 | 37.8 | 62.2 |
| Karlstad | 7.2 | 5,677 | 45.5 | 24.6 | 22.8 | 0.2 | 6.9 | 52.4 | 47.6 |
| Karlstad hundred | 5.3 | 4,203 | 56.0 | 7.8 | 18.2 | 2.8 | 15.1 | 71.1 | 28.9 |
| Kil | 8.4 | 6,630 | 44.1 | 8.2 | 26.2 | 8.1 | 13.3 | 57.5 | 42.5 |
| Kristinehamn | 4.5 | 3,563 | 46.1 | 21.9 | 26.6 | 0.0 | 5.5 | 51.6 | 48.4 |
| Nordmark | 6.5 | 5,125 | 13.5 | 26.1 | 53.1 | 3.6 | 3.7 | 17.2 | 82.8 |
| Nyed | 2.3 | 1,815 | 30.2 | 17.0 | 36.9 | 4.4 | 11.5 | 41.7 | 58.3 |
| Näs | 4.1 | 3,280 | 21.6 | 18.4 | 31.6 | 23.0 | 5.3 | 26.9 | 73.1 |
| Visnum | 3.2 | 2,514 | 30.2 | 15.4 | 30.3 | 14.3 | 9.8 | 40.0 | 60.0 |
| Väse | 3.3 | 2,592 | 29.3 | 16.7 | 47.2 | 5.9 | 0.8 | 30.1 | 69.9 |
| Älvdal | 11.6 | 9,212 | 32.4 | 8.3 | 19.1 | 2.2 | 37.9 | 70.4 | 29.6 |
| Ölme | 1.5 | 1,154 | 33.1 | 30.2 | 30.6 | 4.2 | 1.8 | 34.9 | 65.1 |
| Postal vote | 0.1 | 59 | | | | | | | |
| Total | 4.6 | 79,333 | 36.1 | 19.5 | 29.5 | 5.5 | 12.4 | 48.5 | 51.5 |
Source: SCB

=== Västerbotten ===
| Location | Share | Votes | S | AV | F | B | K/V | Left | Right |
|---|---|---|---|---|---|---|---|---|---|
| Burträsk | 6.3 | 2,754 | 1.7 | 51.5 | 41.8 | 2.0 | 2.9 | 4.6 | 95.4 |
| Degerfors | 5.1 | 2,228 | 9.2 | 19.2 | 61.4 | 6.7 | 3.6 | 12.8 | 87.2 |
| Lycksele | 6.5 | 2,830 | 3.4 | 20.9 | 63.5 | 9.2 | 3.0 | 6.5 | 93.5 |
| Nordmaling-Bjurholm | 10.6 | 4,657 | 11.7 | 26.8 | 42.9 | 9.0 | 9.6 | 21.3 | 78.7 |
| Norsjö-Malå | 5.4 | 2,379 | 4.2 | 25.4 | 60.9 | 2.9 | 5.9 | 10.1 | 89.2 |
| Nysätra | 10.7 | 4,683 | 0.6 | 40.1 | 48.1 | 1.9 | 9.2 | 9.8 | 90.2 |
| Skellefteå | 2.1 | 935 | 12.9 | 55.8 | 29.6 | 0.1 | 1.5 | 14.4 | 85.6 |
| Skellefteå ting | 27.3 | 11,952 | 7.4 | 45.0 | 29.6 | 6.1 | 11.9 | 19.3 | 80.7 |
| Umeå | 4.0 | 1,734 | 4.2 | 49.5 | 35.2 | 0.7 | 10.3 | 14.5 | 85.5 |
| Umeå ting | 14.7 | 6,445 | 10.4 | 14.1 | 48.7 | 16.7 | 10.0 | 20.4 | 79.6 |
| Vilhelmina | 4.3 | 1,867 | 1.1 | 17.7 | 50.9 | 8.7 | 20.0 | 21.2 | 77.3 |
| Åsele | 2.9 | 1,277 | 1.5 | 19.1 | 58.5 | 12.6 | 7.7 | 9.2 | 90.2 |
| Postal vote | 0.0 | 15 | | | | | | | |
| Total | 2.5 | 43,756 | 6.4 | 33.0 | 44.0 | 7.3 | 9.1 | 15.6 | 84.3 |
Source: SCB

=== Västernorrland ===
| Location | Share | Votes | S | AV | F | B | K/V | Left | Right |
|---|---|---|---|---|---|---|---|---|---|
| Boteå | 6.5 | 4,713 | 0.8 | 10.8 | 9.5 | 18.6 | 60.3 | 61.2 | 38.8 |
| Fjällsjö | 4.1 | 3,001 | 2.2 | 20.8 | 11.1 | 9.6 | 56.3 | 58.5 | 41.5 |
| Härnösand | 3.0 | 2,195 | 8.7 | 40.1 | 28.3 | 1.6 | 21.3 | 30.0 | 70.0 |
| Indal | 2.8 | 2,032 | 36.0 | 8.3 | 25.1 | 20.4 | 10.1 | 46.2 | 53.8 |
| Ljustorp | 3.1 | 2,270 | 43.3 | 7.9 | 26.1 | 13.4 | 9.3 | 52.6 | 47.4 |
| Medelpad Västra | 12.6 | 9,167 | 37.8 | 6.6 | 23.9 | 22.0 | 9.7 | 47.5 | 52.5 |
| Njurunda | 3.7 | 2,679 | 53.0 | 6.8 | 11.2 | 10.5 | 18.6 | 71.6 | 28.4 |
| Nordingrå | 2.9 | 2,120 | 2.2 | 19.2 | 39.7 | 24.9 | 14.0 | 16.2 | 83.8 |
| Nätra | 7.3 | 5,297 | 7.8 | 15.6 | 42.8 | 18.0 | 15.9 | 23.7 | 76.3 |
| Ramsele-Resele | 4.8 | 3,488 | 1.3 | 15.5 | 11.2 | 28.1 | 44.0 | 45.3 | 54.7 |
| Själevad-Arnäs | 10.3 | 7,507 | 4.1 | 18.5 | 42.2 | 14.4 | 20.7 | 24.9 | 75.1 |
| Skön | 11.9 | 8,609 | 64.7 | 7.7 | 11.4 | 4.9 | 11.2 | 76.0 | 24.0 |
| Sollefteå | 1.1 | 807 | 10.4 | 40.9 | 30.0 | 1.6 | 17.1 | 27.5 | 72.5 |
| Sollefteå ting | 4.1 | 2,958 | 7.5 | 13.7 | 7.0 | 22.4 | 49.5 | 57.0 | 43.0 |
| Sundsvall | 5.1 | 3,703 | 32.7 | 43.8 | 20.2 | 0.6 | 2.8 | 35.5 | 64.5 |
| Ångermanland Södra | 14.9 | 10,810 | 5.8 | 7.8 | 19.8 | 14.0 | 52.6 | 58.3 | 41.7 |
| Örnsköldsvik | 1.6 | 1,159 | 9.0 | 36.8 | 32.6 | 0.0 | 21.7 | 30.6 | 69.4 |
| Postal vote | 0.1 | 47 | | | | | | | |
| Total | 4.2 | 72,562 | 21.4 | 14.6 | 22.5 | 14.3 | 27.1 | 48.5 | 51.5 |
Source: SCB

=== Västmanland ===
The three left-wing parties were running under a joint list in the constituency. Parties' reports at an overall constituency level were reported separately to denote MP distribution.

| Location | Share | Votes | S/K/V | AV | F | B | Left | Right |
|---|---|---|---|---|---|---|---|---|
| Arboga | 2.7 | 1,376 | 59.1 | 22.2 | 17.2 | 1.5 | 59.1 | 40.9 |
| Gamla Norberg | 11.6 | 5,875 | 74.3 | 6.6 | 13.3 | 5.7 | 74.3 | 25.5 |
| Köping | 4.0 | 2,027 | 39.7 | 29.1 | 23.9 | 7.2 | 39.7 | 60.2 |
| Norrbo | 4.4 | 2,216 | 57.9 | 3.2 | 16.6 | 22.3 | 57.9 | 42.1 |
| Sala | 4.6 | 2,336 | 46.5 | 28.9 | 21.7 | 2.8 | 46.5 | 53.5 |
| Siende | 2.9 | 1,469 | 54.9 | 5.8 | 22.7 | 16.3 | 54.9 | 44.8 |
| Simtuna | 5.9 | 2,995 | 36.2 | 15.4 | 24.1 | 24.3 | 36.2 | 63.8 |
| Skinnskatteberg | 5.2 | 2,635 | 73.7 | 8.1 | 12.8 | 5.3 | 73.7 | 26.2 |
| Snevringe | 12.9 | 6,572 | 66.6 | 6.6 | 15.0 | 11.8 | 66.6 | 33.4 |
| Torstuna | 2.9 | 1,497 | 38.0 | 17.0 | 15.5 | 29.5 | 38.0 | 62.0 |
| Tuhundra | 1.6 | 836 | 43.7 | 4.9 | 26.6 | 24.8 | 43.7 | 56.2 |
| Vagnsbro | 2.5 | 1,271 | 31.7 | 2.4 | 29.0 | 37.0 | 31.7 | 68.3 |
| Våla | 5.4 | 2,738 | 33.9 | 6.3 | 37.1 | 22.7 | 33.9 | 66.1 |
| Västerås | 17.0 | 8,642 | 63.2 | 19.4 | 16.4 | 1.0 | 63.2 | 36.8 |
| Yttertjurbo | 1.6 | 829 | 36.4 | 5.4 | 24.2 | 33.9 | 36.4 | 63.6 |
| Åkerbo | 10.3 | 5,240 | 49.9 | 11.5 | 20.5 | 17.9 | 49.9 | 49.9 |
| Övertjurbo | 4.3 | 2,186 | 30.2 | 5.4 | 20.7 | 43.8 | 30.2 | 69.8 |
| Postal vote | 0.0 | 12 | | | | | | |
| Total | 2.9 | 50,752 | 54.9 | 12.1 | 19.2 | 13.7 | 54.9 | 45.0 |
Source: SCB

=== Älvsborg ===
==== Älvsborg N ====
| Location | Share | Votes | S | AV | F | B | K/V | Left | Right |
|---|---|---|---|---|---|---|---|---|---|
| Ale | 9.0 | 4,279 | 31.6 | 18.7 | 14.0 | 33.2 | 2.5 | 34.1 | 65.9 |
| Alingsås | 3.5 | 1,686 | 35.3 | 33.6 | 27.6 | 0.1 | 3.5 | 38.8 | 61.2 |
| Bjärke | 2.8 | 1,335 | 8.2 | 35.2 | 49.1 | 7.6 | 0.0 | 8.2 | 91.8 |
| Flundre | 4.6 | 2,184 | 65.6 | 9.6 | 4.7 | 20.1 | 0.0 | 65.6 | 34.4 |
| Gäsene | 7.5 | 3,578 | 5.5 | 50.5 | 23.3 | 20.2 | 0.4 | 6.0 | 94.0 |
| Kulling | 10.8 | 5,134 | 13.9 | 37.7 | 35.5 | 11.6 | 0.1 | 15.1 | 84.9 |
| Nordal | 5.6 | 2,675 | 27.4 | 14.5 | 25.5 | 32.6 | 0.0 | 27.4 | 72.6 |
| Sundal | 6.7 | 3,190 | 5.5 | 42.2 | 9.4 | 42.8 | 0.0 | 5.5 | 94.5 |
| Trollhättan | 6.8 | 3,252 | 73.9 | 12.2 | 12.9 | 0.2 | 0.8 | 74.7 | 25.3 |
| Tössbo | 3.7 | 1,776 | 22.7 | 37.4 | 28.0 | 11.4 | 0.3 | 23.1 | 76.9 |
| Valbo | 6.3 | 2,996 | 21.6 | 34.2 | 13.0 | 28.0 | 3.2 | 24.8 | 75.2 |
| Vedbo | 12.5 | 5,956 | 34.1 | 10.8 | 35.9 | 17.2 | 1.9 | 36.0 | 64.0 |
| Väne | 6.0 | 2,876 | 45.3 | 18.2 | 16.7 | 15.8 | 4.1 | 49.4 | 50.6 |
| Vänersborg | 4.8 | 2,270 | 34.2 | 35.0 | 17.7 | 0.1 | 13.0 | 47.2 | 52.8 |
| Vättle | 5.7 | 2,729 | 44.0 | 25.0 | 25.3 | 5.2 | 0.5 | 44.4 | 55.6 |
| Åmål | 3.5 | 1,650 | 53.6 | 29.2 | 14.5 | 0.0 | 2.7 | 56.3 | 43.7 |
| Postal vote | 0.0 | 16 | | | | | | | |
| Total | 2.7 | 47,582 | 31.5 | 26.8 | 22.5 | 17.2 | 2.0 | 33.5 | 66.5 |
Source: SCB

==== Älvsborg S ====
| Location | Share | Votes | S | AV | F | B | K/V | Left | Right |
|---|---|---|---|---|---|---|---|---|---|
| Bollebygd | 4.5 | 1,899 | 16.4 | 68.0 | 6.6 | 8.0 | 0.9 | 17.3 | 82.6 |
| Borås | 19.1 | 8,099 | 45.2 | 39.4 | 11.7 | 0.5 | 3.2 | 48.4 | 51.6 |
| Kind | 24.3 | 10,275 | 12.7 | 48.6 | 18.1 | 20.1 | 0.5 | 13.2 | 86.8 |
| Mark | 26.1 | 11,055 | 19.3 | 53.7 | 7.4 | 15.5 | 4.1 | 23.4 | 76.6 |
| Redväg | 8.8 | 3,727 | 5.7 | 41.7 | 17.7 | 34.3 | 0.6 | 6.3 | 93.7 |
| Ulricehamn | 2.8 | 1,191 | 22.4 | 43.0 | 25.1 | 0.5 | 9.0 | 31.4 | 68.6 |
| Veden | 5.6 | 2,356 | 6.4 | 57.8 | 15.3 | 19.4 | 1.1 | 7.5 | 92.5 |
| Ås | 8.8 | 3,723 | 4.3 | 53.6 | 8.2 | 31.1 | 2.8 | 7.1 | 92.9 |
| Postal vote | 0.0 | 7 | | | | | | | |
| Total | 2.4 | 42,332 | 19.4 | 49.2 | 12.7 | 16.2 | 2.5 | 21.8 | 78.2 |
Source: SCB

=== Örebro ===
| Location | Share | Votes | S | AV | F | B | K/V | Left | Right |
|---|---|---|---|---|---|---|---|---|---|
| Asker | 4.4 | 2,600 | 30.9 | 12.2 | 49.8 | 6.3 | 0.7 | 31.6 | 68.4 |
| Askersund | 0.9 | 545 | 27.0 | 35.6 | 31.0 | 6.4 | 0.0 | 27.0 | 73.0 |
| Edsberg | 5.9 | 3,500 | 31.0 | 11.1 | 37.6 | 12.6 | 7.7 | 38.7 | 61.3 |
| Fellingsbro | 4.4 | 2,594 | 35.6 | 14.3 | 20.1 | 26.1 | 3.9 | 39.5 | 60.5 |
| Glanshammar | 2.9 | 1,714 | 20.9 | 15.2 | 41.7 | 20.8 | 1.3 | 22.3 | 77.7 |
| Grimsten | 3.7 | 2,194 | 43.5 | 9.2 | 28.4 | 7.2 | 11.7 | 55.2 | 44.8 |
| Grythytte-Hällefors | 4.2 | 2,470 | 52.0 | 5.3 | 9.2 | 3.2 | 30.2 | 82.2 | 17.8 |
| Hardemo | 1.0 | 607 | 16.6 | 22.1 | 31.0 | 26.7 | 3.6 | 20.3 | 79.7 |
| Karlskoga hundred | 9.2 | 5,463 | 53.9 | 10.6 | 16.5 | 11.1 | 7.9 | 61.8 | 38.2 |
| Kumla hundred | 10.0 | 5,917 | 33.8 | 19.9 | 34.3 | 6.3 | 5.7 | 39.5 | 60.5 |
| Lindes-Ramsberg | 6.2 | 3,700 | 38.2 | 7.4 | 16.4 | 32.2 | 5.7 | 43.9 | 56.1 |
| Lindesberg | 1.6 | 949 | 28.6 | 30.2 | 33.6 | 6.3 | 1.3 | 29.8 | 70.2 |
| Nora | 1.2 | 731 | 23.7 | 40.5 | 23.8 | 0.7 | 11.4 | 35.0 | 65.0 |
| Nora-Hjulsjö | 4.1 | 2,455 | 45.5 | 10.5 | 18.3 | 13.7 | 12.0 | 57.4 | 42.6 |
| Nya Kopparberg | 4.8 | 2,873 | 64.0 | 11.5 | 14.9 | 3.4 | 6.2 | 70.3 | 29.7 |
| Sköllersta | 4.7 | 2,760 | 24.3 | 15.2 | 49.8 | 8.3 | 2.4 | 26.7 | 73.3 |
| Sundbo | 4.8 | 2,856 | 50.7 | 10.5 | 14.8 | 22.3 | 1.7 | 52.4 | 47.6 |
| Örebro | 17.1 | 10,115 | 50.0 | 20.8 | 24.5 | 0.0 | 4.7 | 54.7 | 45.3 |
| Örebro hundred | 8.8 | 5,214 | 46.9 | 18.2 | 27.9 | 4.4 | 2.5 | 49.4 | 50.6 |
| Postal vote | 0.0 | 13 | | | | | | | |
| Total | 3.4 | 59,270 | 42.3 | 15.1 | 26.5 | 9.9 | 6.2 | 48.5 | 51.5 |
Source: SCB

=== Östergötland ===
| Location | Share | Votes | S | AV | F | B | K/V | Left | Right |
|---|---|---|---|---|---|---|---|---|---|
| Aska | 4.9 | 4,728 | 54.5 | 18.1 | 10.3 | 11.4 | 5.8 | 60.2 | 39.8 |
| Bankekind | 4.1 | 3,975 | 53.0 | 13.4 | 12.9 | 16.9 | 3.8 | 56.8 | 43.2 |
| Björkekind | 1.4 | 1,326 | 29.3 | 19.5 | 10.9 | 40.0 | 0.2 | 29.6 | 70.4 |
| Boberg | 2.6 | 2,516 | 41.9 | 23.8 | 10.8 | 19.2 | 4.3 | 46.2 | 53.8 |
| Bråbo | 2.0 | 1,897 | 68.0 | 19.1 | 4.0 | 2.8 | 6.1 | 74.1 | 25.9 |
| Dal | 1.3 | 1,270 | 52.0 | 21.6 | 9.0 | 15.0 | 2.4 | 54.3 | 45.6 |
| Finspånga län | 8.7 | 8,446 | 42.4 | 11.3 | 15.3 | 20.0 | 11.0 | 53.4 | 46.6 |
| Gullberg | 1.9 | 1,860 | 33.4 | 14.9 | 16.6 | 21.1 | 14.0 | 47.4 | 52.6 |
| Göstring | 5.1 | 4,916 | 37.6 | 18.4 | 15.3 | 19.2 | 9.5 | 47.1 | 52.9 |
| Hammarkind | 4.7 | 4,533 | 32.7 | 21.8 | 24.7 | 16.7 | 4.1 | 36.8 | 63.2 |
| Hanekind | 2.2 | 2,156 | 36.0 | 27.0 | 18.4 | 16.5 | 2.1 | 38.1 | 61.9 |
| Kinda | 5.6 | 5,386 | 31.2 | 27.8 | 19.1 | 20.5 | 1.3 | 32.5 | 67.5 |
| Linköping | 8.4 | 8,069 | 39.3 | 39.2 | 16.4 | 0.7 | 4.3 | 43.6 | 56.4 |
| Lysing | 2.9 | 2,845 | 26.6 | 29.0 | 15.1 | 27.8 | 1.4 | 28.0 | 72.0 |
| Lösing | 1.7 | 1,634 | 56.7 | 15.1 | 9.2 | 17.7 | 1.3 | 58.0 | 42.0 |
| Memming | 3.0 | 2,927 | 54.6 | 26.3 | 11.7 | 1.6 | 5.8 | 60.4 | 39.6 |
| Mjölby | 2.0 | 1,919 | 49.1 | 20.9 | 19.0 | 6.7 | 4.3 | 53.4 | 46.6 |
| Motala | 1.7 | 1,602 | 32.5 | 38.6 | 21.3 | 0.0 | 7.6 | 40.1 | 59.9 |
| Norrköping | 21.9 | 21,097 | 61.1 | 31.9 | 5.6 | 0.3 | 1.2 | 62.2 | 37.8 |
| Skänninge | 0.5 | 527 | 28.3 | 44.6 | 22.6 | 0.6 | 4.0 | 32.3 | 67.7 |
| Skärkind | 1.5 | 1,455 | 42.9 | 22.2 | 16.8 | 15.8 | 2.2 | 45.1 | 54.8 |
| Söderköping | 0.9 | 839 | 29.1 | 43.0 | 25.0 | 1.1 | 1.8 | 30.9 | 69.1 |
| Vadstena | 1.1 | 1,038 | 42.3 | 38.8 | 15.4 | 0.9 | 2.6 | 44.9 | 55.1 |
| Valkebo | 2.4 | 2,323 | 39.9 | 23.7 | 15.8 | 20.2 | 0.4 | 40.2 | 59.7 |
| Vifolka | 2.4 | 2,348 | 33.1 | 25.6 | 16.1 | 19.9 | 5.3 | 38.4 | 61.6 |
| Ydre | 2.4 | 2,293 | 24.3 | 15.1 | 19.0 | 38.3 | 3.3 | 27.6 | 72.4 |
| Åkerbo | 1.0 | 993 | 19.6 | 42.7 | 16.0 | 20.2 | 1.4 | 21.0 | 79.0 |
| Östkind | 1.7 | 1,594 | 26.7 | 19.6 | 18.3 | 35.1 | 0.3 | 27.0 | 73.0 |
| Postal vote | 0.0 | 21 | | | | | | | |
| Total | 5.5 | 96,533 | 44.8 | 25.3 | 13.5 | 12.3 | 4.1 | 48.9 | 51.1 |
Source: SCB
