= Nora Municipality =

Nora Municipality Nora kommun
- Municipality
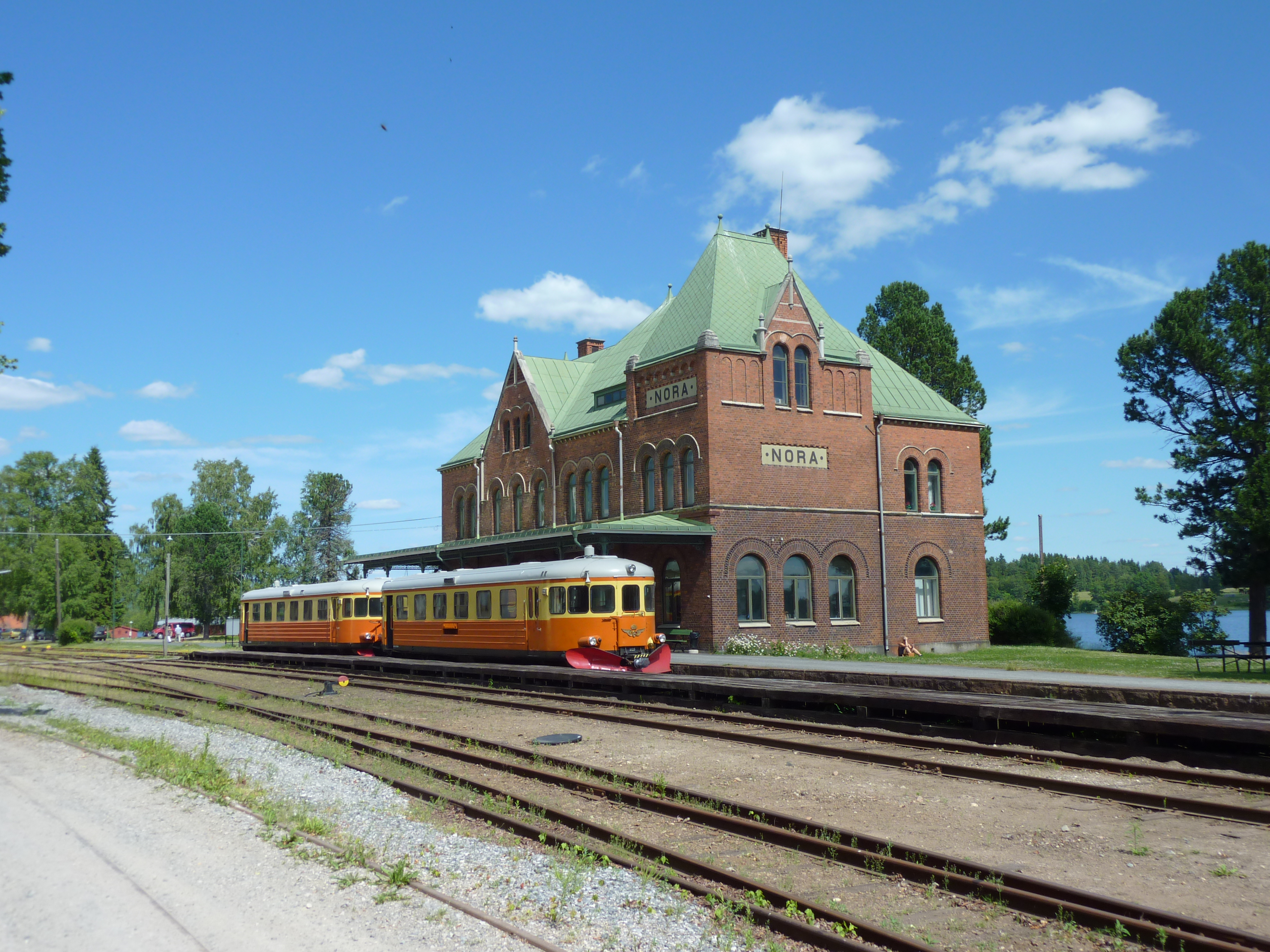
- Nora Railway Station

- Coat of arms

- Coordinates: 59°31′N 15°02′E
- Country: Sweden
- County: Örebro County
- Seat: Nora

Area
  - Total: 690.82 km^{2} (266.73 sq mi)
  - Land: 618.49 km^{2} (238.80 sq mi)
  - Water: 72.33 km^{2} (27.93 sq mi)
- Area as of 1 January 2014.

Population (30 June 2025)
  - Total: 10,588
  - Density: 17.119/km^{2} (44.338/sq mi)
- Time zone: UTC+1 (CET)
  - Summer (DST): UTC+2 (CEST)
- ISO 3166 code: SE
- Province: Västmanland
- Municipal code: 1884
- Website: www.nora.se

Nora Municipality (Swedish: Nora kommun) is a municipality in Örebro County in central Sweden. Its seat is located in the city of Nora.

The amalgamation leading to the present municipality took place already in 1967 and in 1971 the City of Nora became a unitary municipality.

== Localities ==
- Dalkarlsberg
- Gyttorp
- Järnboås
- Nora (seat)
- Nyhyttan
- Pershyttan
- Striberg
- Vikersvik
- Ås

== Demographics ==
This is a demographic table based on Nora Municipality's electoral districts in the 2022 Swedish general election sourced from SVT's election platform, in turn taken from SCB official statistics.

In total there were 10,707 residents, including 8,277 Swedish citizens of voting age resident in the municipality. 48.0% voted for the left coalition and 50.1% for the right coalition. Indicators are in percentage points except population totals and income.

Location	Residents	Citizen adults	Left vote	Right vote	Employed	Swedish parents	Foreign heritage	Income SEK	Degree
Location			%	%					
Dalsta-Born	1,501	1,202	48.7	49.9	83	84	16	26,193	42
Gyttorp-Viker	1,467	1,111	45.1	53.3	76	81	19	23,903	24
Hagby-Esstorp	1,525	1,189	50.3	48.1	84	84	16	24,369	38
Hitorp-Alntorp	1,661	1,267	48.1	49.0	79	86	14	25,269	40
Järnboås-Klacka	724	587	43.0	53.9	82	85	15	24,687	38
Karlsäng-Pershyttan	1,436	1,082	52.8	45.8	74	76	24	21,164	31
Torget-Gunnarsberg	1,435	1,099	48.3	50.1	73	79	21	22,106	33
Ås-Ringshyttan	958	740	43.9	55.1	88	93	7	28,519	30
Source: SVT

== Riksdag elections ==
Year	%	Votes	V	S	MP	C	L	KD	M	SD	NyD	Left	Right
1973	89.9	5,833	5.0	49.9		24.0	9.2	2.8	8.8			54.9	42.0
1976	91.5	6,277	3.9	49.0		25.8	9.7	2.2	9.3			52.9	44.8
1979	90.3	6,515	4.5	49.3		20.5	9.9	2.1	12.7			53.8	43.1
1982	91.1	6,683	4.4	53.0	2.1	16.8	6.0	2.2	15.6			57.4	38.4
1985	89.3	6,594	4.4	51.7	2.1	12.3	13.6		15.8			56.1	41.7
1988	85.5	6,327	5.8	49.3	5.9	10.9	11.7	3.5	12.6			61.0	35.2
1991	86.0	6,585	5.6	42.2	3.4	9.1	8.1	7.6	15.6		7.8	47.8	40.4
1994	86.5	6,754	7.0	50.4	5.4	7.8	7.3	4.2	16.2		1.1	62.8	35.5
1998	81.4	6,332	14.1	42.1	4.2	5.7	4.5	11.4	16.2			60.4	37.8
2002	79.5	6,273	9.1	45.2	4.0	7.8	11.3	8.9	11.0	1.4		58.3	39.0
2006	81.1	6,362	5.5	43.1	4.6	9.0	6.7	6.2	18.6	4.1		53.2	40.5
2010	84.9	6,745	4.5	40.4	6.1	6.2	6.4	5.5	24.2	5.8		51.0	42.3
2014	85.9	6,924	5.4	39.5	5.1	7.5	3.5	3.9	16.4	15.4		50.0	31.4
2018	86.9	6,922	6.3	33.7	3.4	8.9	3.6	6.3	14.7	21.2		52.3	46.0

== Twin towns ==
Nora's twin towns with the year of its establishing:

- Kõo, Estonia (1991)
- Fladungen, Germany (1996)
- Hône, Italy (2008)

== See also ==
- Nora, Indianapolis (named after Nora in Sweden)
- Nora Township, Clearwater County, Minnesota
- Nora Township, Pope County, Minnesota
