= Nora (surname) =

Nora is a surname, and may refer to:

- Alessandro Nora (born 1987), Italian water polo player
- Arlind Nora (born 1980)), Albanian footballer
- Ashley Nora, American artist
- Fabrice Nora (1951–2020), French press executive
- Frederick E. Nora (born 1952), American pathologist
- José Nora (1940–1993), Spanish basketball player
- Matteo de Nora, Canadian businessman
- Oronzio De Nora (1921–2003), Italian businessman
- Pierre Nora (1931–2025), French historian
- Simon Nora (1921–2006), French official
