= Nora Township =

Nora Township may refer to:

- Nora Township, Jo Daviess County, Illinois
- Nora Township, Clearwater County, Minnesota
- Nora Township, Pope County, Minnesota
- Nora Township, LaMoure County, North Dakota, in LaMoure County, North Dakota
