= Angelini =

Italian industrial group

- Type: Private
- Industry: Pharma, Personal care, Machinery, Wine, Perfumery
- Founded: 1919
- Headquarters: Rome, Italy
- Area served: Worldwide
- Key people: Franco Masera (Chairman); Sergio Marullo di Condojanni (CEO)
- Revenue: €2.057 billion (2022)
- Number of employees: 5800 (2022)
- Website: www.angeliniindustries.com

Angelini Pharma logo

Angelini is a large, privately owned, Italian industrial group operating internationally. Founded in Italy in the early twentieth century, the Angelini group has offices in 21 countries. Owned by Angelini family and currently led by Sergio Marullo di Condojanni and Thea Paola Angelini, the industrial group employs approximately 5800 people.

== History ==
The antidepressant medication Trazodone was developed in the 1960s by scientists at Angelini.

Since 2000, Angelini has been the producer of Amuchina, the sanitizing solution invented by Oronzio De Nora.

In a 2018, evaluation of firms' reputation issued by Reputation Institute, Angelini ranked 66th in general and second among life sciences companies.

In 2020, Angelini took over ownership of Thermacare after Pfizer spun off the transdermal analgesic patch after its merger with GlaxoSmithKline's consumer healthcare division.

In January 2021, the Swiss biotech company Arvelle Therapeutics was acquired for $960 million.

In 2022 the Angelini has been rebranded as "Angelini Industries". The new brand has been adopted by Angelini Pharma, Angelini Technologies, Angelini Wines & Estates, Angelini Beauty and Angelini Ventures.
