= Viker =

Viker may refer to:

== Places ==
- Viker, Buskerud, a village in Ringerike municipality, Norway
- Viker Church, a historic church in the village of Viker in Ringerike, Norway
- Viker, Fredrikstad, a village in Fredrikstad municipality, Norway
- Viker, Østfold, a village in Hvaler municipality, Norway
- Viker, Sweden, parish in Örebro County, Sweden

== People ==
- Henriette Viker (born 1973), Norwegian footballer
- Ola Viker (1897–1972), Norwegian writer and lawyer
