= Gyttorp =

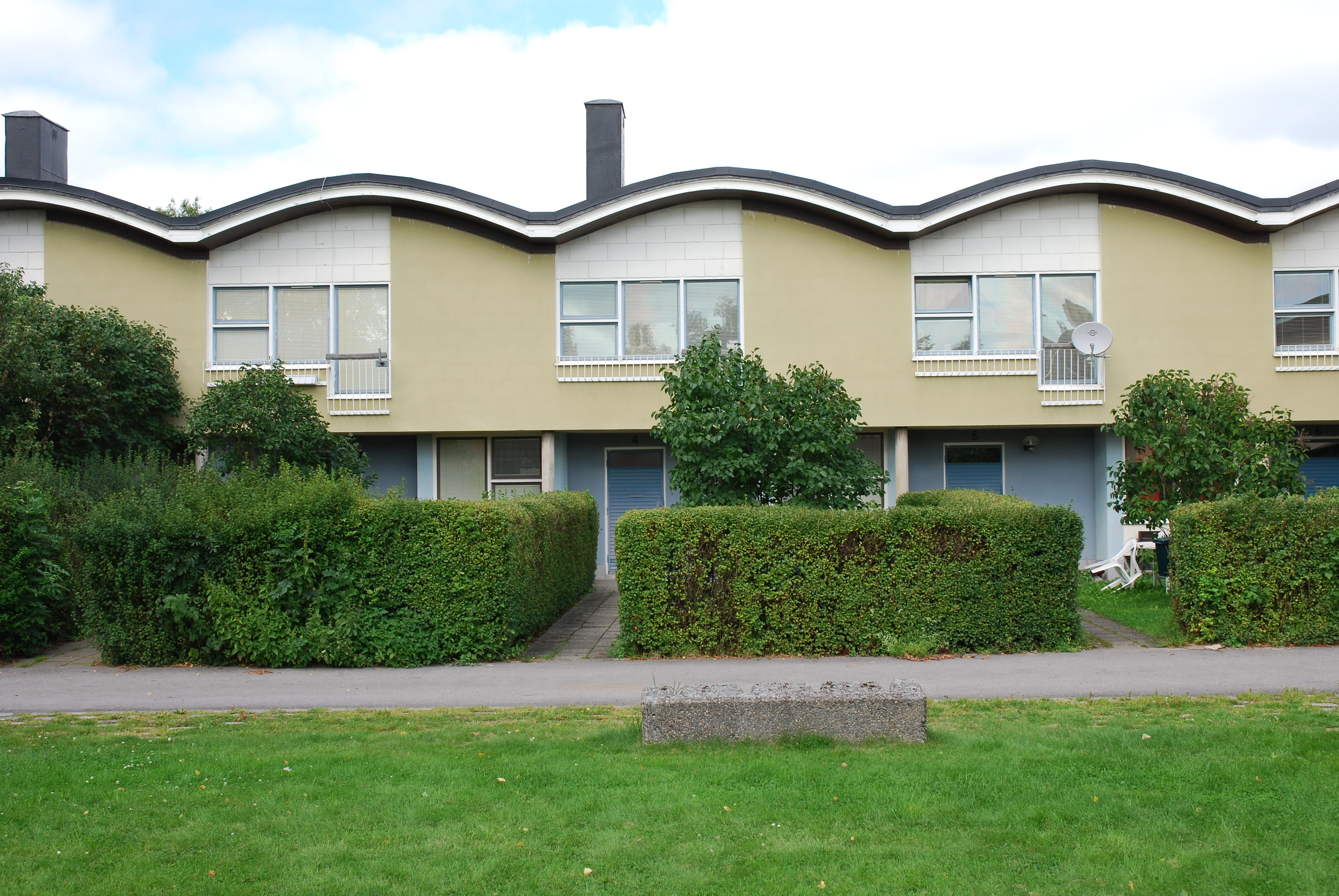
- Typical town houses in Gyttorp

- Location within Örebro Location within Sweden
- Coordinates: 59°30′N 14°58′E
- Country: Sweden
- Province: Västmanland
- County: Örebro County
- Municipality: Nora Municipality
- First mentioned: 1539

Area
  - Total: 2.74 km^{2} (1.06 sq mi)

Population (31 December 2010)
  - Total: 661
  - Density: 241/km^{2} (620/sq mi)
- Time zone: UTC+1 (CET)
  - Summer (DST): UTC+2 (CEST)

Gyttorp is a locality situated in Nora Municipality, Örebro County, Sweden with 661 inhabitants in 2010. Today it is mainly known for its explosive factory and Ralph Erskine's typical town houses. It is situated by lake Vikern.

== History ==
Gyttorp was most probably settled during the Middle Ages as the place name suggests. Most probably the meaning of the name is Gydhi's or Gydha's new settlement.

=== Manor house ===
Gyttorp is mentioned as Gyetorp in the oldest taxation list for the area from 1539. The owner of Gyttorp estate and blast furnace at that time was the district senior juryman Karl Nilsson. He was ennobled in 1561 by king Eric XIV of Sweden. His coat of arms showed an oak leaf. This made Gyttorp estate a manor house for some decades.

=== Military industry ===
Karl Nilsson died in 1569, but the estate stayed in his family until 1606 when the Swedish state bought it in order to build a small scale military industry at the site. A new blast furnace and foundry were soon built where cannons, cannonballs and grenades were made of iron. This military production was continued until the mid 17th century, but from 1621 by private lease-holders. In 1670 the Swedish state sold Gyttorp to private owners and the water power was now only used for a watermill and saw mill. A furnace for copper production was built here in the 1710s but was closed in the 1750s. Between 1706 and 1804 there was an inn in Gyttorp.

=== Explosive factory ===
In 1858 an explosive factory was built next by lake Vikern in Gyttorp. At first gunpowder and later nitroglycerin and dynamite was produced. The explosives were mainly used for blasting in mines. In 1915 this Gyttorps Sprängämnes AB was united with Alfred Nobel's company Nitroglycerin AB and in a few years the new company moved all its production to Gyttorp. This meant that a new modern factory was built in Gyttorp and around it a new urban area grew up. Many private homes were built and after World War II Nitroglycerin AB gave the British architect Ralph Erskine the task to plan the new modern Gyttorp which has given Gyttorp a very typical architecture. 131 apartments as well as business premises and a school were built between 1948 and 1961. In the 1950s the explosive factory employed more than 800 workers.

Today the explosive factory is owned by the Australian company Orica and the production is concentrated to detonation systems such as Nonel that was invented by the engineers in Gyttorp during the 1960s. The once in all aspects dominating factory that around 1980 had 1600 employees today has a workforce of less than a fifth of that figure.

Shotgun shells have been produced in Gyttorp since 1908 under the brand Gyttorp. The production was started by Gyttorps Sprängämnes AB but today it's produced by the company Gyttorp AB.

== Riksdag elections ==
Year	%	Votes	V	S	MP	C	L	KD	M	SD	NyD	Left	Right
1973	91.2	737	5.0	65.9		18.0	4.7	1.8	4.3			71.0	27.1
1976	91.3	710	4.8	65.4		18.0	5.1	1.0	5.6			70.1	28.7
1979	89.1	703	4.4	67.3		13.5	6.1	0.6	7.3			71.7	26.9
1982	90.3	701	5.3	72.9	0.4	10.8	2.6	0.1	7.8			78.2	21.3
1985	89.4	658	6.4	70.4	1.4	7.8	6.2		7.9			76.7	21.9
1988	83.4	589	7.3	67.1	2.9	9.3	6.3	1.0	5.8			77.2	21.4
1991	85.8	589	9.0	58.2	0.8	7.8	4.6	2.4	8.8		7.6	67.2	23.6
1994	88.2	574	9.1	65.2	2.3	6.6	4.5	1.0	9.8		1.4	76.5	22.0
1998	78.7	512	19.3	53.9	2.7	4.9	3.3	6.3	8.2			76.0	22.7
2002	74.2	491	12.8	58.2	1.8	6.1	7.7	6.3	4.3	1.8		72.9	24.4
2006	79.7	516	5.4	57.0	3.1	6.8	5.2	3.3	11.6	6.6		65.5	26.9
2010	80.6	572	5.4	51.2	3.3	5.2	4.5	3.8	19.1	6.8		60.0	32.7
2014	79.6	559	5.9	44.7	2.0	5.9	2.3	2.3	11.8	21.3		52.6	22.4
2018	84.7	579	7.1	36.1	1.6	7.8	1.2	5.9	9.7	28.3		52.5	45.1
