= Matteo de Nora =

Canadian businessman

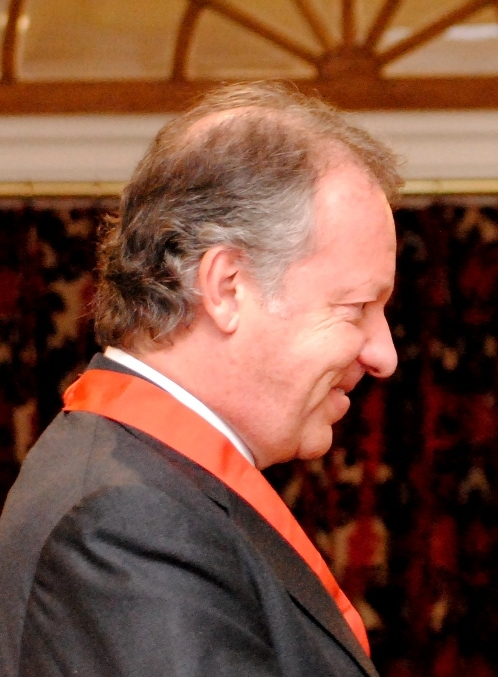
- Dr. Matteo de Nora when he received the Companion of the New Zealand Order of Merit in 2011
- Born: USA
- Citizenship: Canadian
- Education: Choate School, Bocconi University; MIT Sloan School of Management
- Occupations: Businessman, philanthropist
- Known for: Team Principal (Emirates Team New Zealand)
- Honours: Companion of New Zealand Order of Merit (CNZM)

Matteo de Nora is a Canadian businessman known for being team principal of Team New Zealand.

== Early life and family ==
De Nora was born in the United States. His mother, Chantal de Bavier, was Swiss while his father, Vittorio, was an Italian Professor of physics and chemistry at the Milan Polytechnic and entrepreneur, best known for his instrumental role in developing DSA (Dimensionally Stable Anodes). His uncle, Oronzio De Nora, the entrepreneur and inventor who founded Industrie De Nora, recently listed on Borsa Italiana.

== Education and career ==
De Nora attended the Choate School, the Universita Bocconi in Milan, and then the MIT Sloan School of Management. He worked for Industrie De Nora, his family's company and later founded his own company, the Eltech Systems Corporation.

== Emirates Team New Zealand ==
In 2000, de Nora began getting involved in Team New Zealand in the America's Cup. In 2003, he formed the "Mates", a group of benefactors to support the team. Over the years he has increased his involvement becoming the Team Principal. The team is the most successful America's Cup team in modern history and a well-recognised high-technology organisation.

== Personal life ==
De Nora is a citizen of Canada and a resident of Monaco. He is a Director of the Monaco Yacht Club. He is an active philanthropist, substantively contributing to the response to the 2011 Christchurch earthquake and funding medical research.

He holds patents in the medical sector and is co-founder of A.L.T. (Associazione per la Lotta alla Trombosi) and T.R.I. (Tinnitus Research Initiative).
