= Amuchina =

- Type: Disinfectant
- Inventor: Oronzio De Nora
- Inception: 1923
- Manufacturer: Angelini
- Available: Yes
- Website: www.amuchina.it

Amuchina is an Italian sanitizing liquid solution produced by Angelini Industries. The solution, based on sodium hypochlorite, is reported to eliminate 99.9% of bacteria, fungi and viruses. The brand was invented by Oronzio De Nora in 1923. It was acquired by Angelini in 2000. The product is produced in two of Angelini's production lines, one in Ancona, Italy and the other near Switzerland.

== History ==
The solution was invented by Oronzio De Nora and patented while he was a student at Politecnico di Milano in 1923. He sold the patent prior to founding De Nora. The name is inspired by the Greek word for scratch or abrasion.

The product was widely used to prevent tuberculosis starting with the 1939 epidemic. Its use was largely at pharmacies and hospitals until it gained wide popularity during the cholera epidemic in the 1980s. It was also used in the 2002–2004 SARS outbreak and H1N1 in 2009.

The solution played a big role in Italy's response to the Coronavirus pandemic where shortages were reported. 7,000 dispensers of Amuchina were added to Trenitalia trains in 2021 in a partnership between the train company and Angelini. De Nora also invented machines to Codogno to produce sodium hypochlorite.

== Popular culture ==
An artist has used Amuchina to paint.
