= Nora Chipaumire =

Choreographer and performer (born 1965)

Nora Chipaumire is a choreographer and performer born in Zimbabwe in 1965 and currently based in Brooklyn, NYC. Her work focuses on racial and gender stereotypes. On November 11, 2026, was awarded an Anonymous Was A Woman grant.

Nora, a documentary film based on her life, was released in 2008.
