= ThermaCare =

Brand of disposable heating pads

- Product type: Heating pad
- Current owner: Angelini
- Country: United States
- Introduced: 2001
- Markets: Worldwide
- Previous owners: Procter & Gamble; Wyeth; Pfizer
- Website: https://www.thermacare.com/

ThermaCare is a brand name of a disposable heating pad made by Angelini.

The brand was first introduced in 2001 by Procter & Gamble. P&G sold the Thermacare brand to Wyeth in 2008 and merged with Pfizer in 2009. Another merger occurred between Pfizer's and GlaxoSmithKline's consumer healthcare divisions, and the brand was sold to the Italian pharmaceutical company Angelini in 2021.

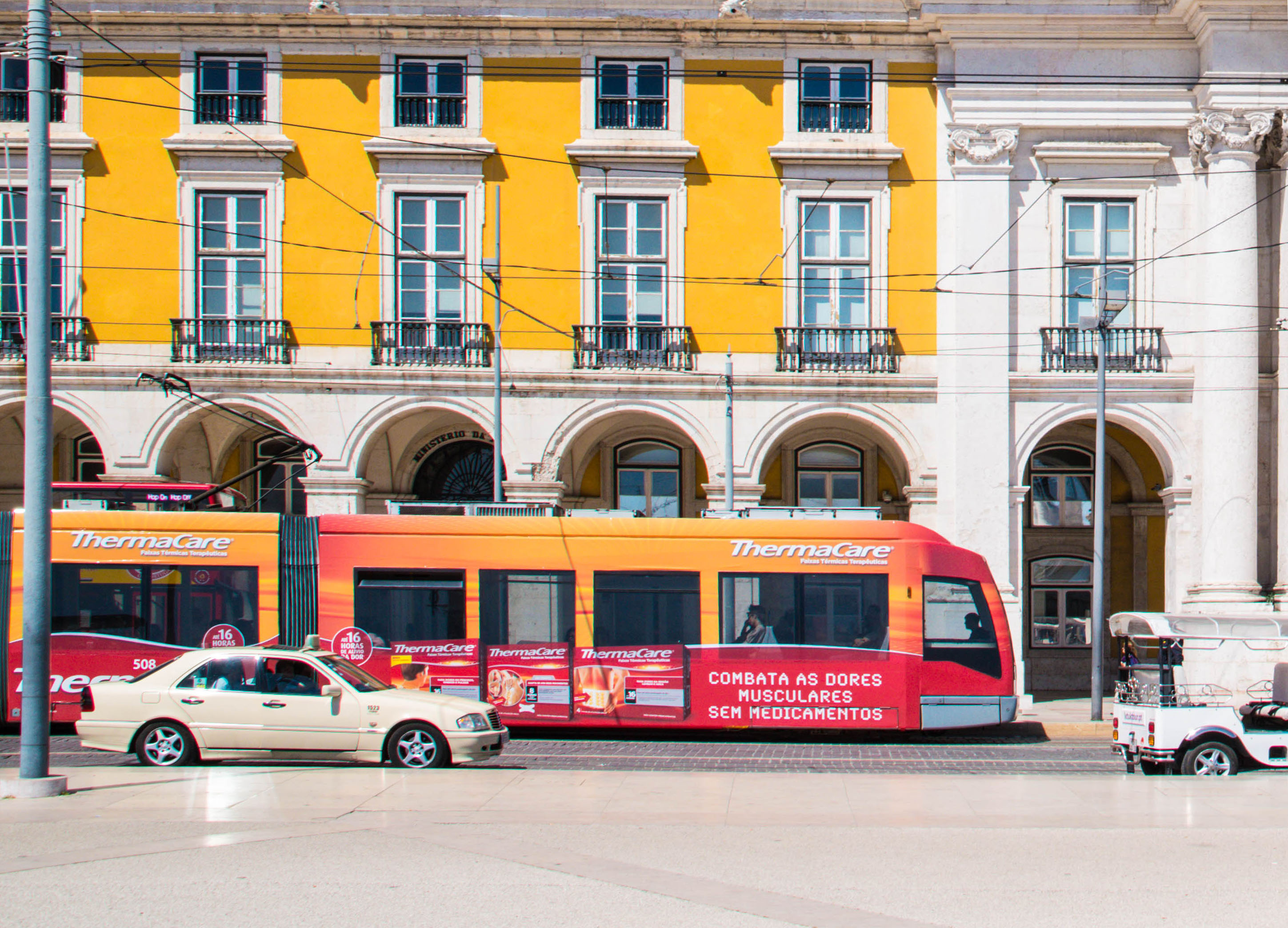
ThermaCare advertisement on a Lisbon tram, in 2017.

== Application ==
ThermaCare is a type of Continuous Low-level Heat-wrap Therapy (CLHT), that activates upon contact with air, providing approximately eight hours of heat directly to the area where the heat-wrap is applied. Thermacare heat-wraps are designed for specific applications, including neck or wrist pain, lower back pain, knee pain, and menstrual cramps. Continuous Low-level Heat-wrap Therapy (CLHT) has been shown to provide better results than cold therapy in the early treatment and prevention of Delayed Onset Muscle Soreness (DOMS) - muscle soreness that occurs within 1 to 2 days of physical exertion.

In a low back pain study conducted at the U.S. Spine & Sport Foundation in San Diego, California in 2006, participants treated with Continuous Low-level Heat-wrap Therapy (CLHT) prior to exercise reported less intense pain and less trouble moving after 24 hours than the control group. Study participants treated with the heat-wraps also showed greater (138%) pain relief than those who received standard cold pack treatment, according to the study's research director, John Mayer, Ph.D. The study concluded that heat-wraps were effective in the early treatment and prevention of Delayed Onset Muscle Soreness (DOMS) - soreness that occurs within 1-2 days of physical exertion.

Thermacare heat-wraps have been studied in 13 randomized controlled clinical trials for muscle pain relief efficacy. When applied to the lower back muscles, it provided greater pain relief for 24 hours after application when compared to ibuprofen, acetaminophen, and no treatment. When the same product was applied to the wrist, it decreased pain and improved range of motion (ROM) in patients experiencing wrist pain.

== Mechanism ==
It was developed in 1997 as a portable heat wrap for the treatment of back pain that didn't use counter-irritants such as menthol or capsaicin. It's designed as a cloth wrap that houses several small disks made of iron powder, activated charcoal, sodium chloride, and water. When the wrap is removed from its sealed pouch and exposed to oxygen, the disks oxidize in an exothermic reaction. This mechanism allows portable heat wraps to maintain their heat for the entire 90-minute application, compared to conventional silicate-gel hot packs that start to lose heat at 15–20 minutes. Similar to silicate-gel hot packs, the average temperature increase of the paraspinal muscles is 2.2°C, at 1.5cm depth and 1.1°C at 2cm.

== See also ==
- Delayed onset muscle soreness (DOMS)
