= Striberg =

- Location within Örebro Location within Sweden
- Coordinates: 59°32′N 14°56′E
- Country: Sweden
- Province: Västmanland
- County: Örebro County
- Municipality: Nora Municipality

Area
  - Total: 0.70 km^{2} (0.27 sq mi)

Population (31 December 2010)
  - Total: 317
  - Density: 451/km^{2} (1,170/sq mi)
- Time zone: UTC+1 (CET)
  - Summer (DST): UTC+2 (CEST)

Striberg (Swedish pronunciation: [ˈstrǐːbærj]) is a locality situated in Nora Municipality, Örebro County, Sweden with 317 inhabitants in 2010. It is the birthplace of composer Dag Wirén.
