= Ås, Nora =

Ås
- Location within Örebro Location within Sweden
- Coordinates: 59°32′N 14°59′E
- Country: Sweden
- Province: Västmanland
- County: Örebro County
- Municipality: Nora Municipality

Area
  - Total: 0.49 km^{2} (0.19 sq mi)

Population (31 December 2010)
  - Total: 499
  - Density: 1,016/km^{2} (2,630/sq mi)
- Time zone: UTC+1 (CET)
  - Summer (DST): UTC+2 (CEST)

Ås is a locality situated in Nora Municipality, Örebro County, Sweden with 499 inhabitants in 2010.
