= De Nora =

Italian multinational company

Industrie De Nora S.p.A.
- Company type: S.p.A.
- Traded as: BIT: DNR; FTSE Italia Mid Cap
- Industry: Electrochemistry
- Founded: 1923; 102 years ago in Milan, Italy.
- Founder: Oronzio De Nora
- Headquarters: Milan, Italy
- Area served: Worldwide
- Key people: Paolo Dellachà (CEO)
- Revenue: ▲€852.826 million (2022)
- Net income: ▲€89.665 million (2022)
- Number of employees: ▲1,929 (2022)
- Website: denora.com

Industrie De Nora S.p.A. is an Italian multinational company based in Milan that operates in the electrochemical industry. The company is the world's leading supplier of electrodes for all major industrial electrochemical processes.

== History ==
The company was founded in 1923 by Italian engineer Oronzio De Nora, who also invented Amuchina, among other things.

In 1969, the company began a process of geographical expansion, entering various foreign markets starting with Japan and then expanding to Singapore, Brazil, India, China, and Germany, establishing both subsidiaries and joint ventures.

Since 2015, the company has also been operating in the water treatment and filtration sector, applying its technological expertise in this field.

In December 2021, it was announced that the company, through a joint venture with German corporation ThyssenKrupp, had been awarded the supply of electrolysis systems needed for the construction of the world's largest green hydrogen production plant as part of the Neom project in Saudi Arabia.

In 2022, the company was listed on the Italian Stock Exchange.

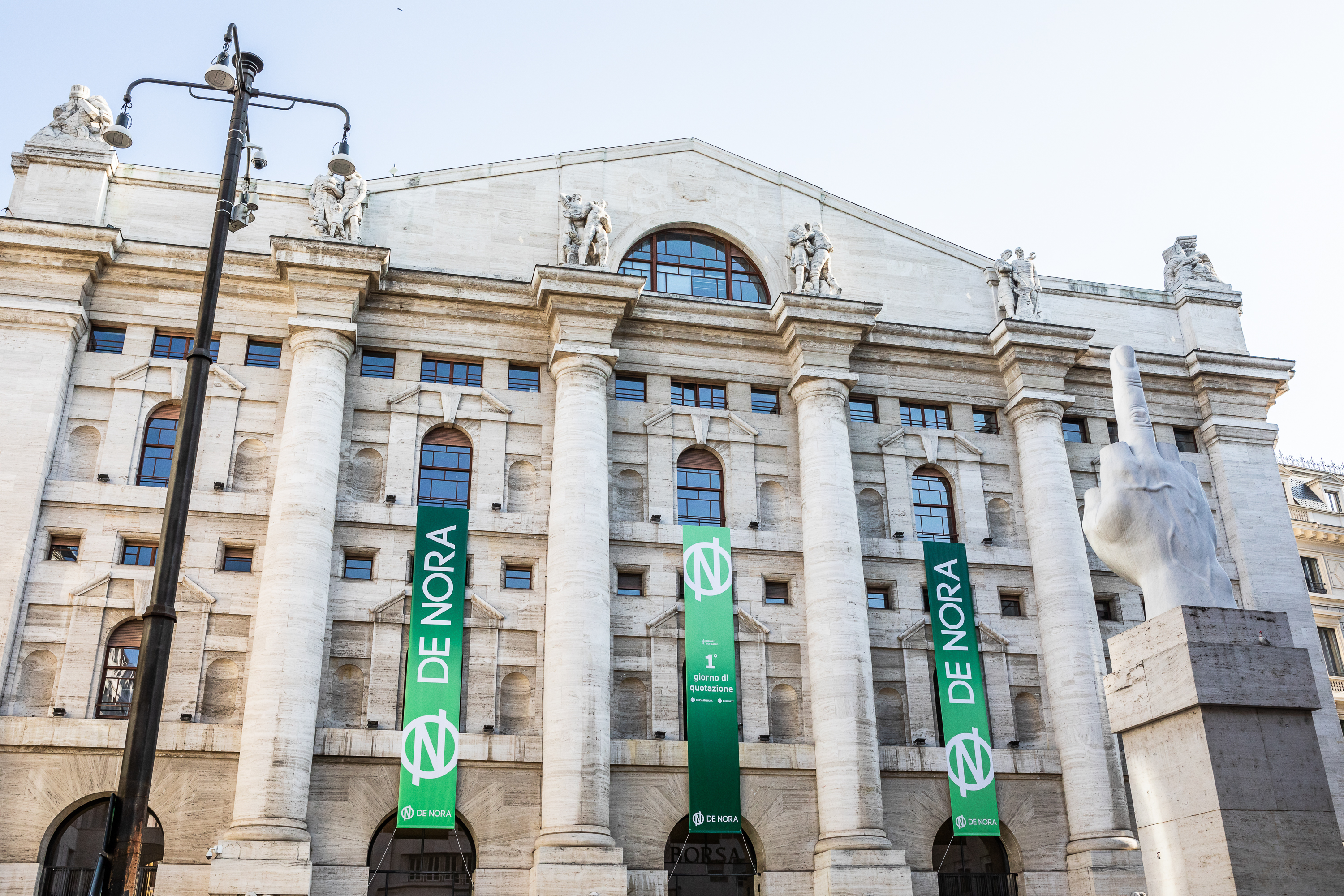
Milan Stock Exchange on the day of De Nora's listing

== Operations ==
Industrie De Nora operates in the electrochemical industry through the production of electrodes with various applications. These applications pertain to three main reference markets: industrial applications, water treatment, and energy transition in the field of green hydrogen production.

With a turnover of €852.826 million and a net income of €89.665 million in 2022, the company is present in various locations, including Italy, Germany, the United Kingdom, the United States, Brazil, the United Arab Emirates, India, China, Japan, and Singapore.
