= Viker, Sweden =

Parish in Västmanland, Sweden

Coordinates: 59.4569°N 14.8914°E

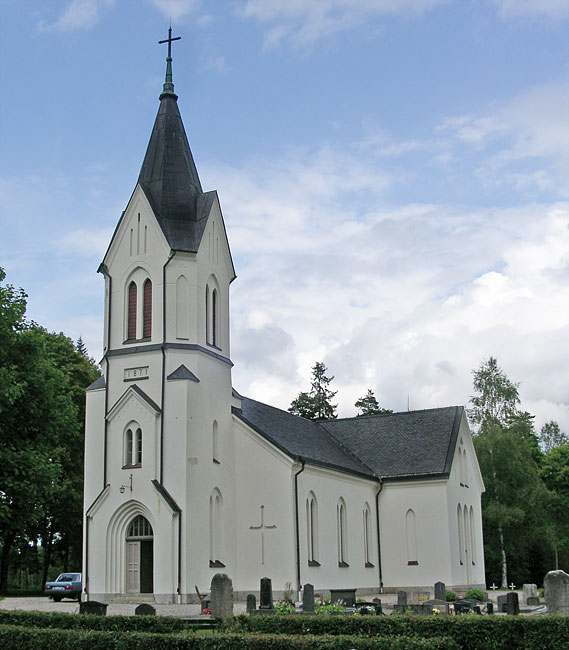
Viker Church in 2004.

Viker is a parish in the historical province of Västmanland and in present Nora Municipality, Örebro County, Sweden. It has 527 inhabitants (2007).

Viker is situated in Nora Municipality's southwestern corner in the central part of Örebro County.

Viker chapel was founded within Nora parish in 1868 and became its own parish in 1871. Viker church was built in 1869–1871. Viker formed its own municipality 1878–1951. In 1952 it was incorporated in Noraskog municipality, that in 1965 was incorporated in Nora Municipality.

Viker parish has an area of 148,57 km² from which 133,95 km² is land. The lakes Vikern (only partly in Viker), Älvlången, Malmlången (part of Svartälven) and Hovmanstorpsjön are situated in Viker. Beteshult in the southern part of Viker is the highest point of the area with 253 meters above sea level.

The villages Bengtstorp, Skrekarhyttan, Älvhyttan, Gamla Viker, Nya Viker, Dalkarlshyttan and the localities Dalkarlsberg and Vikersvik are situated in Viker.

The area has had an extensive iron industry with several mines and blast furnaces. But the last mine, Dalkarlsberg, was closed down in 1948 and Skrekarhyttan's blast furnace was closed in 1918.
