= Nora (2008 film) =

- Directed by: Alla Kovgan, David Hinton
- Screenplay by: Alla Kovgan, David Hinton, Nora Chipaumire
- Produced by: Movement Revolution Productions (MRP)
- Starring: Nora Chipaumire, Souleymane Badolo
- Cinematography: Mkrtich Malkhasyan
- Edited by: Alla Kovgan
- Music by: Thomas Mapfumo
- Release date: 2008
- Running time: 35 minutes
- Countries: Mozambique; United Kingdom; United States

Nora is a 2008 documentary film.

== Synopsis ==
Nora is based on the life of dancer Nora Chipaumire, who was born in Zimbabwe in 1965. In the film, Nora returns to the landscape of her childhood and travels through the vivid memories of her youth. Using performance and dance, she brings her story to life in a swift poem of sounds and images. Shot entirely on location in South Africa, Nora portrays a multitude of local performers and dancers of all ages, from schoolchildren to grandmothers. Much of the film's music was specially composed by the legend of Zimbabwean music, Thomas Mapfumo.

== Awards ==
- Dance on Camera, New York 2009
- Black Maria Film Festival 2009
- Honolulu Film Festival 2009
- FIFA, Festival of Films on Art Canada 2009
- Ann Arbor Film Festival 2009
