= Nora, Idaho =

Unincorporated community in Idaho, United States

Coordinates: 46°45′50″N 116°42′07″W

Nora is an unincorporated community in Latah County, in the U.S. state of Idaho.

== History ==
Nora contained a post office from 1900 until 1906. The community was originally built up chiefly by Scandinavians.
