= Social Democratic Left Party of Sweden (1921) =

- Founded: March 25, 1921
- Dissolved: 1923
- Split from: SSV
- Merged into: SAP
- Newspaper: Västerbottens Folkblad
- Ideology: Social democracy Anti-communism
- Political position: Left-wing
- International affiliation: IWUSP

Social Democratic Left Party of Sweden (Swedish: Sverges Socialdemokratiska Vänsterparti, SSV) was a political party formed in 1921 after a split from the original SSV.

When the original SSV approved the 21 theses of the Communist International and in so doing changed its name to SKP (Communist Party of Sweden) in 1921, an anti-ComIntern minority was expelled and founded its own "SSV". This "SSV" existed between 1921 and 1923. The leader of this party was Ivar Vennerström. "SSV" participated in two elections, the parliamentary election of 1921 and the municipal election of 1922. In 1923, it merged with the Social Democrats.

Västerbottens Folkblad, a newspaper published in Umeå, was then a publication of this tendency. Today it is a social democratic magazine.
