= Nora, Sweden =

Nora
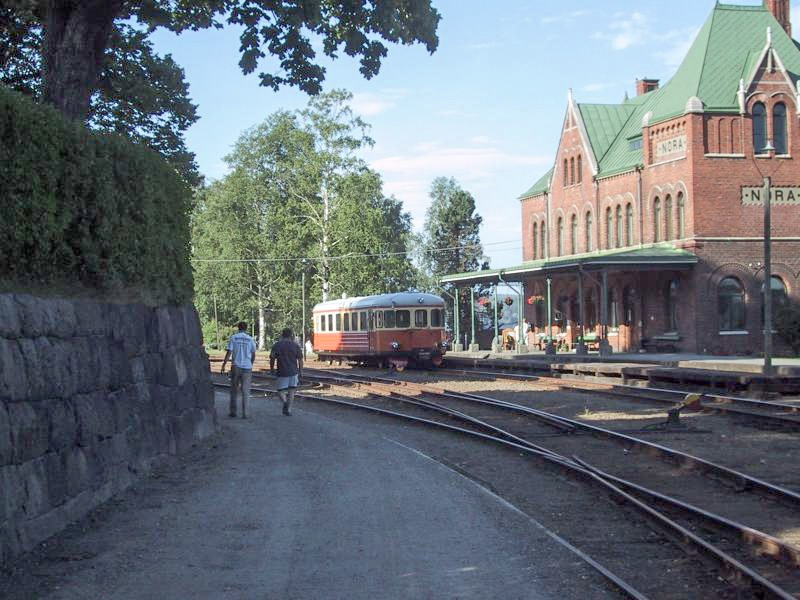
- Nora railway station

- Location within Örebro Location within Sweden
- Coordinates: 59°31′N 15°02′E
- Country: Sweden
- Province: Västmanland
- County: Örebro County
- Municipality: Nora Municipality

Area
  - Total: 6.45 km^{2} (2.49 sq mi)

Population (31 December 2010)
  - Total: 6,526
  - Density: 1,012/km^{2} (2,620/sq mi)
- Time zone: UTC+1 (CET)
  - Summer (DST): UTC+2 (CEST)

Nora is a locality and the seat of Nora Municipality, Örebro County, Sweden with 10,611 inhabitants in 2024.

== History ==
Nora received its charter in 1643. The government had requested the inhabitants of both Nora and the adjacent town Lindesberg to move together into a newly chartered city called Järle. However, the government proved unsuccessful, and instead granted both Nora and Lindesberg independent charters at that year.

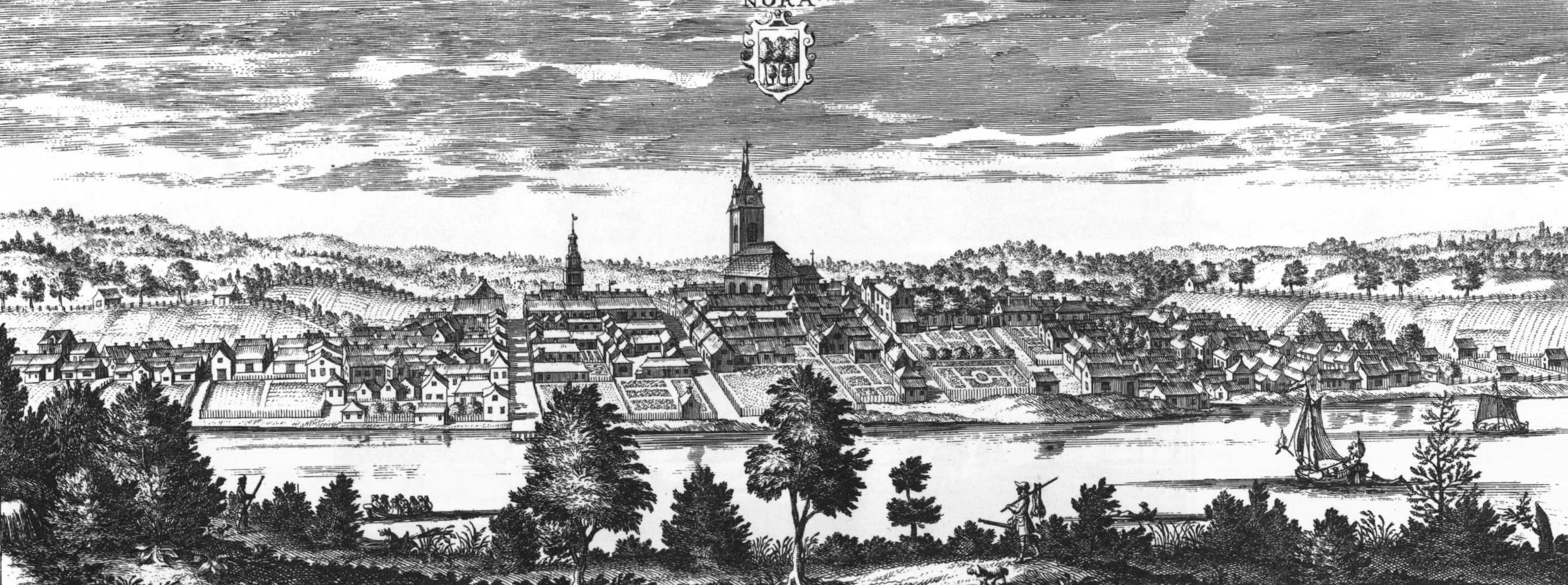
Nora circa 1700, in Suecia antiqua et hodierna.

Many wooden houses built in the 18th and 19th century have been spared from fires and demolition, making the town Nora one of Sweden's best preserved wooden towns. Eksjö and Hjo are two other examples, and they have together with Nora initiated a wooden-town development project. Also part of the old city structure are cobbled streets with small houses and shops by small windling street. Anna Maria Lenngren, a Swedish poet, once proclaimed "Så liten stad, så mycket smak" (Such small town, so much taste).

The first normal gauge railway in Sweden was opened to the public in 1856 between Nora and Ervalla. It is today a museum railway, worked by a preservation society.

== See also ==
- Nora, Indianapolis
