= Oronzio De Nora =

Italian businessman (1921–2003)

- Born: Oronzio De Nora; March 19, 1899; Altamura, Italy
- Died: June 11, 1995 (aged 96); Milan, Italy
- Spouse: Linda Tagliatella

Oronzio De Nora (March 19, 1899 – June 11, 1995) was an Italian engineer and entrepreneur, founder of Industrie De Nora and inventor of the Amuchina disinfectant.

== Biography ==
Born to Michele De Nora, a civil engineer specialized in railways and responsible for the aqueduct in Altamura, and Elvira Colonna, he was the older brother of Vittorio, who also became an engineer.

After studying in his hometown, he moved to Milan. At a young age, he participated in World War I and was decorated with a War Cross on June 2, 1974.

In 1922, he graduated in electrical engineering from the Polytechnic University of Milan. His thesis focused on the electrolysis of alkali chlorides, the sector in which he made a name for himself worldwide. He opened a laboratory near Milano Centrale railway station, and in 1923, he founded Industrie De Nora, becoming a pioneer in the construction of plants for the production of chlorine and caustic soda.

In 1923, he patented Amuchina in Germany, a powerful antibacterial agent obtained from water diluted sodium hypochlorite.

From 1961 to 1969, he was at the helm of ASA, which developed the ASA 1000 GT, designed by Ferrari engineers in the late 1950s.

In 2021, a street in the Ortica district of Milan was named Via Oronzio De Nora in honor of De Nora's scientific contributions.

== Personal life ==
He was married to Linda Tagliatella and was the father of a son, Niccolò. His is the uncle of Matteo de Nora.
