= Nora Township, Pope County, Minnesota =

Nora Township, Minnesota
- Township
- Location within the state of Minnesota Nora Township, Minnesota (the United States)
- Coordinates: 45°42′6″N 95°41′47″W
- Country: United States
- State: Minnesota
- County: Pope

Area
  - Total: 36.2 sq mi (93.7 km^{2})
  - Land: 33.8 sq mi (87.5 km^{2})
  - Water: 2.4 sq mi (6.2 km^{2})
- Elevation: 1,270 ft (387 m)

Population (2000)
  - Total: 207
  - Density: 6.2/sq mi (2.4/km^{2})
- Time zone: UTC-6 (Central (CST))
  - Summer (DST): UTC-5 (CDT)
- FIPS code: 27-46456
- GNIS feature ID: 0665130

Nora Township is a township in Pope County, Minnesota, United States. The population was 203 at the 2020 census.

According to Warren Upham, the name Nora was probably derived from Norway.

== Geography ==
According to the United States Census Bureau, the township has a total area of 36.2 square miles (93.7 km^{2}), of which 33.8 square miles (87.5 km^{2}) is land and 2.4 square miles (6.2 km^{2}) (6.60%) is water.

== Demographics ==
As of the census of 2000, there were 207 people, 84 households, and 59 families residing in the township. The population density was 6.1 people per square mile (2.4/km^{2}). There were 93 housing units at an average density of 2.8/sq mi (1.1/km^{2}). The racial makeup of the township was 100.00% White.

There were 84 households, out of which 26.2% had children under the age of 18 living with them, 67.9% were married couples living together, 3.6% had a female householder with no husband present, and 28.6% were non-families. 23.8% of all households were made up of individuals, and 8.3% had someone living alone who was 65 years of age or older. The average household size was 2.46 and the average family size was 2.97.

In the township the population was spread out, with 24.2% under the age of 18, 6.8% from 18 to 24, 27.5% from 25 to 44, 27.1% from 45 to 64, and 14.5% who were 65 years of age or older. The median age was 41 years. For every 100 females, there were 91.7 males. For every 100 females age 18 and over, there were 98.7 males.

The median income for a household in the township was $33,250, and the median income for a family was $39,583. Males had a median income of $27,917 versus $20,000 for females. The per capita income for the township was $16,833. About 3.9% of families and 7.7% of the population were below the poverty line, including none of those under the age of eighteen and 4.3% of those 65 or over.
