= Nora Township, Clearwater County, Minnesota =

Township in Minnesota, United States

Nora Township
- Township
- Location of Nora Township, within Clearwater County, Minnesota
- Coordinates: 47°27′3″N 95°21′1″W
- Country: United States
- State: Minnesota
- County: Clearwater

Area
  - Total: 36.1 sq mi (93.4 km^{2})
  - Land: 35.8 sq mi (92.7 km^{2})
  - Water: 0.31 sq mi (0.8 km^{2})
- Elevation: 1,572 ft (479 m)

Population (2020)
  - Total: 423
  - Density: 11.8/sq mi (4.56/km^{2})
- Time zone: UTC-6 (Central (CST))
  - Summer (DST): UTC-5 (CDT)
- ZIP code: 56621
- Area code: 218
- FIPS code: 27-46438
- GNIS feature ID: 0665129

Nora Township is a township in Clearwater County, Minnesota, United States. The population was 423 at the 2020 census.

Nora Township was named for Knut Nora, a pioneer farmer and native of Norway.

== Geography ==
According to the United States Census Bureau, the township has a total area of 36.1 square miles (93.4 km^{2}), of which 35.8 square miles (92.7 km^{2}) is land and 0.3 square mile (0.8 km^{2}) (0.83%) is water.

== Demographics ==
As of the census of 2000, there were 408 people, 149 households, and 115 families residing in the township. The population density was 11.4 people per square mile (4.4/km^{2}). There were 174 housing units at an average density of 4.9/sq mi (1.9/km^{2}). The racial makeup of the township was 97.30% White, 0.74% Native American, and 1.96% from two or more races. Hispanic or Latino of any race were 0.25% of the population.

There were 149 households, out of which 34.9% had children under the age of 18 living with them, 66.4% were married couples living together, 4.7% had a female householder with no husband present, and 22.8% were non-families. 18.1% of all households were made up of individuals, and 6.7% had someone living alone who was 65 years of age or older. The average household size was 2.70 and the average family size was 3.03.

In the township the population was spread out, with 25.2% under the age of 18, 7.6% from 18 to 24, 27.2% from 25 to 44, 23.3% from 45 to 64, and 16.7% who were 65 years of age or older. The median age was 40 years. For every 100 females, there were 104.0 males. For every 100 females age 18 and over, there were 107.5 males.

The median income for a household in the township was $31,477, and the median income for a family was $42,500. Males had a median income of $26,250 versus $17,188 for females. The per capita income for the township was $15,197. About 12.9% of families and 12.7% of the population were below the poverty line, including 17.3% of those under age 18 and 8.1% of those age 65 or over.
