= Ship cemetery at Ekenabben =

Place in Blekinge, Sweden

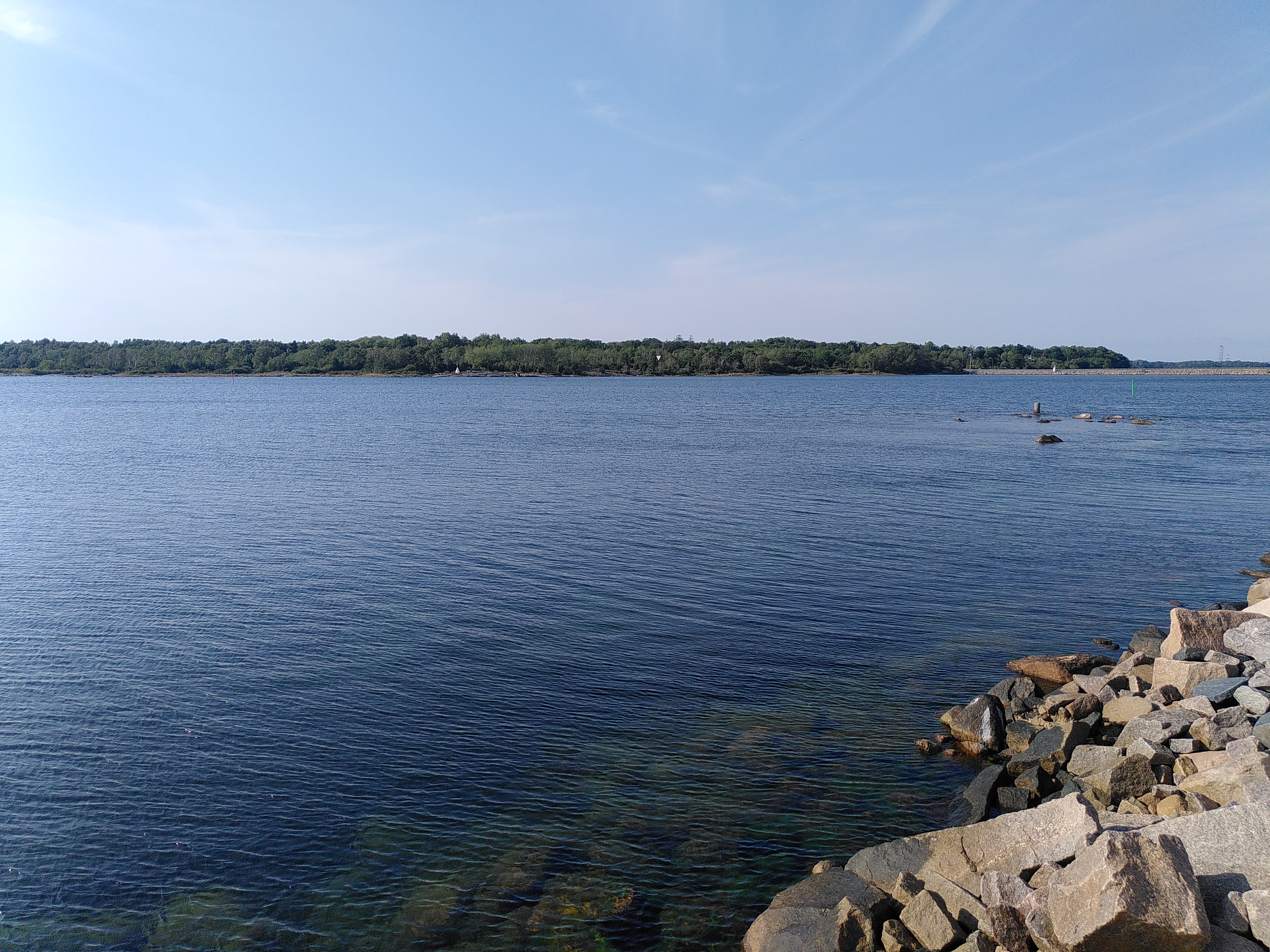
- Photo of ship cemetery taken from Ekenabben harbour

- Location within Blekinge Location within Sweden
- Coordinates: 56°06′07.4638″N 15°37′58.4381″E
- Country: Sweden
- Province: Blekinge
- County: Blekinge County
- Municipality: Karlskrona Municipality
- Elevation: −12 m (−39 ft)
- Time zone: UTC+1 (CET)
  - Summer (DST): UTC+2 (CEST)
- Website: www.visitkarlskrona.se/en/wreck-cemetery-sturko

The ship cemetery at Ekenabben is located in the Djupasund strait between the islands of Sturkö and Tjurkö in the Blekinge archipelago in southern Sweden. The ship cemetery consists of six wrecks from 1550–1650 that were sunk at the end of the 18th and beginning of 19th century to create an underwater barrier and prevent ships' entry to Karlskrona, host to the Karlskrona Naval Base, Sweden's largest naval base.

== History ==
Sweden's defeat in the Franco-Swedish War 1805-1807 forced Sweden to join the Continental System which was a large-scale embargo by Napoleon Bonaparte against the British Empire. However, at the time Britain was Sweden's largest trading partner, and Sweden was generally unwilling to implement the trade embargo. In 1810, this resulted in a French ultimatum that ultimately forced Sweden into the Anglo-Swedish war of 1810-1812.

The same year Sweden received information that the Royal Navy was on its way to capture or destroy the Swedish fleet. Several ships were then sunk on purpose in the Djupasund strait to create an artificial barrier in the inlet to Karlskrona. These ships today make up the majority of the wrecks in the ship cemetery.

== Mapping of the wrecks ==
Since Karlskrona was founded in 1680 around 60 ships have been deliberately sunk in different locations in the archipelago. Between 2020 and 2022 the wrecks in the Djupasund were mapped on behalf of the Blekinge Regional Council, the Blekinge County Council, and the Karlskrona Municipality as part of a wreck-mapping project. The project was started to spread knowledge about Karlskrona's naval history after it was added to UNESCO's list of World Heritage Sites in 1998, to create a park for recreational diving, and strengthen tourism in Blekinge.

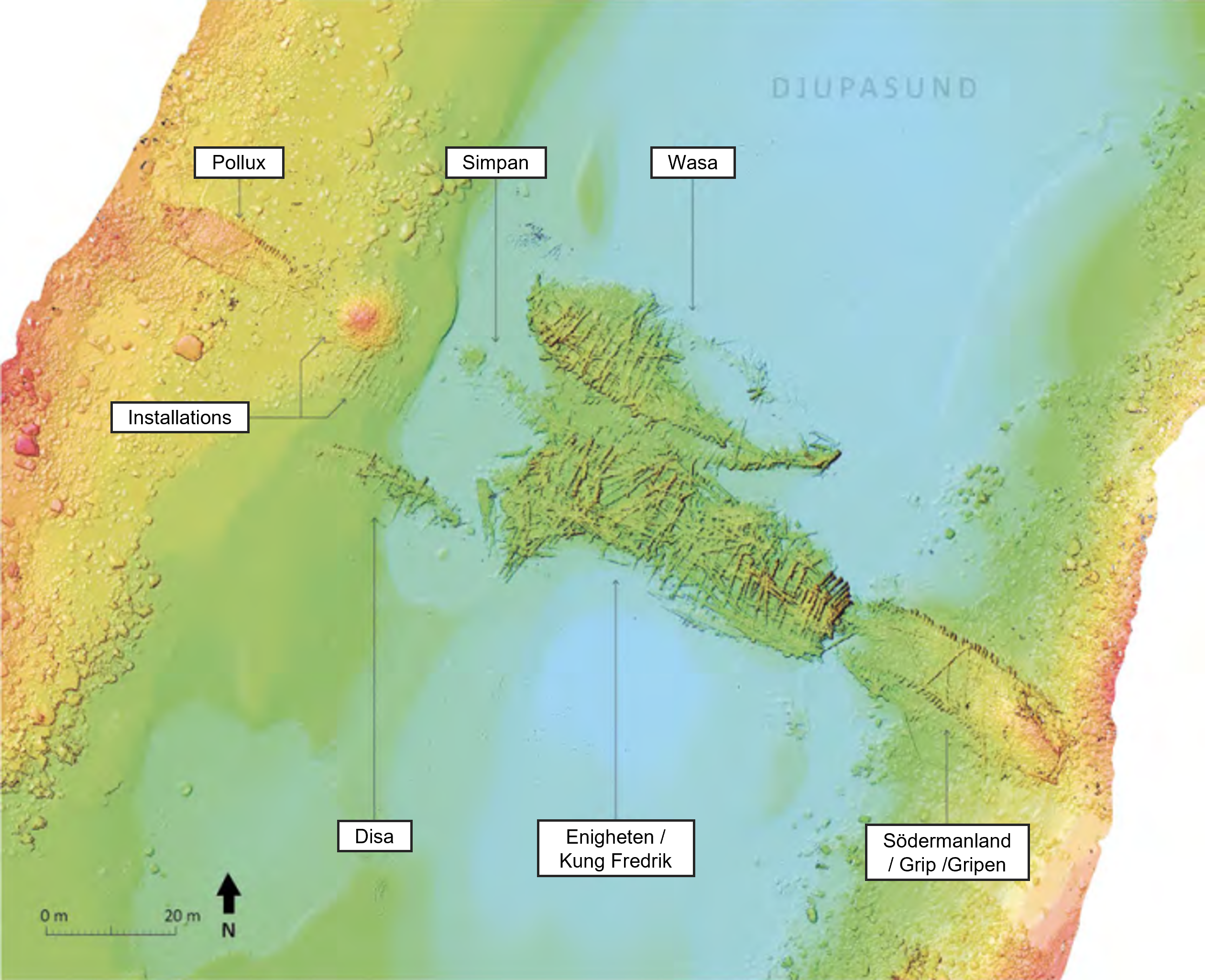
Multibeam mapping of the ship cemetery at Ekenabben

=== Ship of the line Södermanland/Grip/Gripen ===
The ship of the line Södermanland was built in Stockholm and launched in 1749. The ship was around 42 meters (137 ft 10 in) long and 11.3 m (37 ft 1 in) wide, with 50 to 54 cannons. In 1777 the upper deck was removed and she was converted into a frigate and renamed Grip (later Gripen). She then had 44 cannons. In 1810 she was sunk in Djupasund strait.

=== Ship of the line Enigheten/Kung Fredrik ===
The ship of the line Enigheten with 94 cannons was built in 1696 by Charles Sheldon in Karlskrona, rebuilt in 1730 and two years later renamed Kung Fredrik (King Fredrik). Enigheten participated in naval expeditions against Denmark in 1700, at the 1710 Battle of Køge Bay, and at the 1715 Battle of Rügen. She was rebuilt in 1768 and ultimately sunk in the Djupasund strait in 1785.

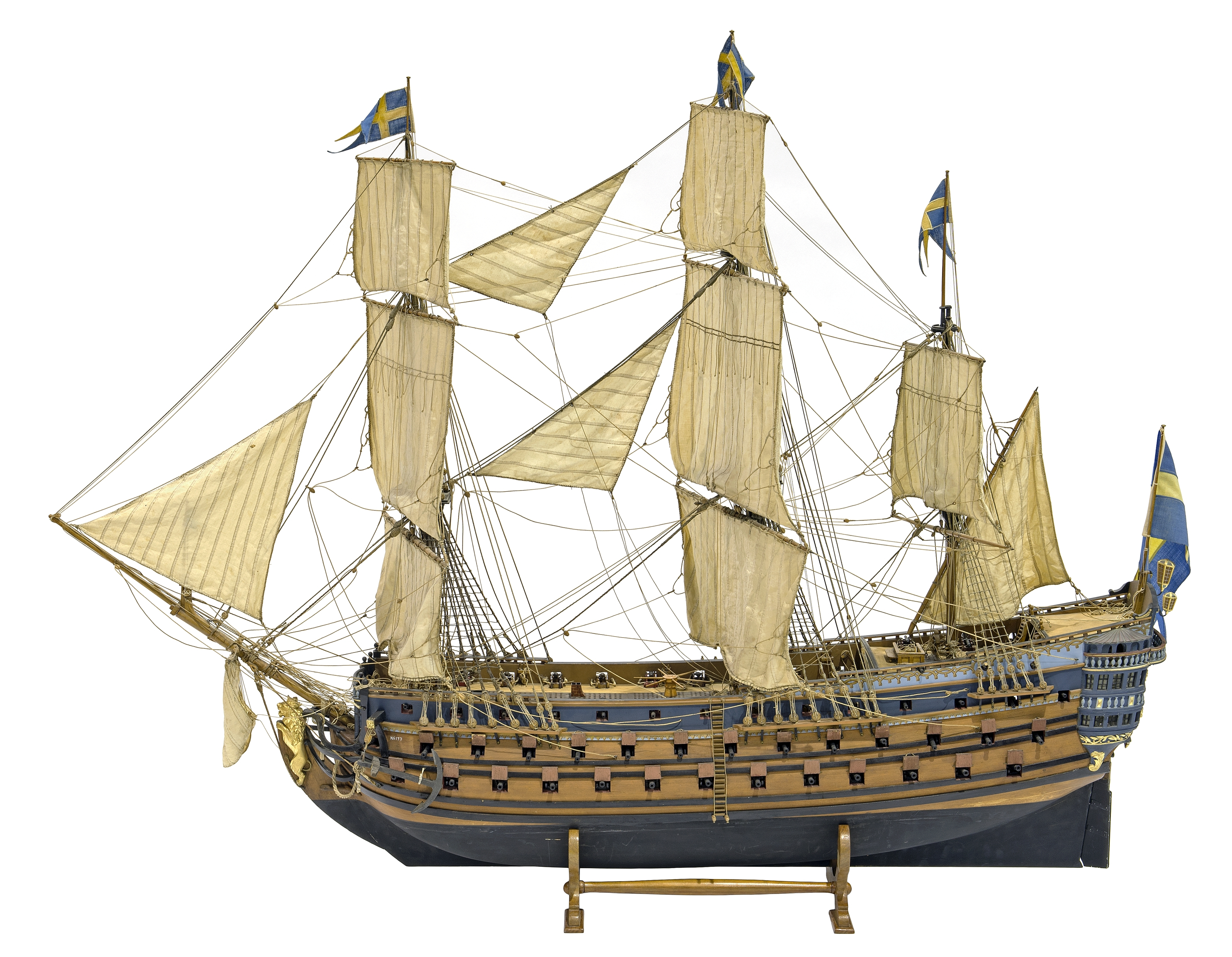
Model of the ship of the line Enigheten.

=== Ship of the line Wasa ===
The ship of the line Wasa was built in Karlskrona in 1778. She participated in battles as part of the naval campaign during the Russo-Swedish War (1788–1790). The Swedish East India Company used Wasa during their voyage to China 1803–1805, and after that the ship was rebought by the Swedish Navy in 1808. She was ultimately sunk in the Djupasund strait in 1836. Wasa is not to be confused with the Swedish galleon Vasa from 1627.

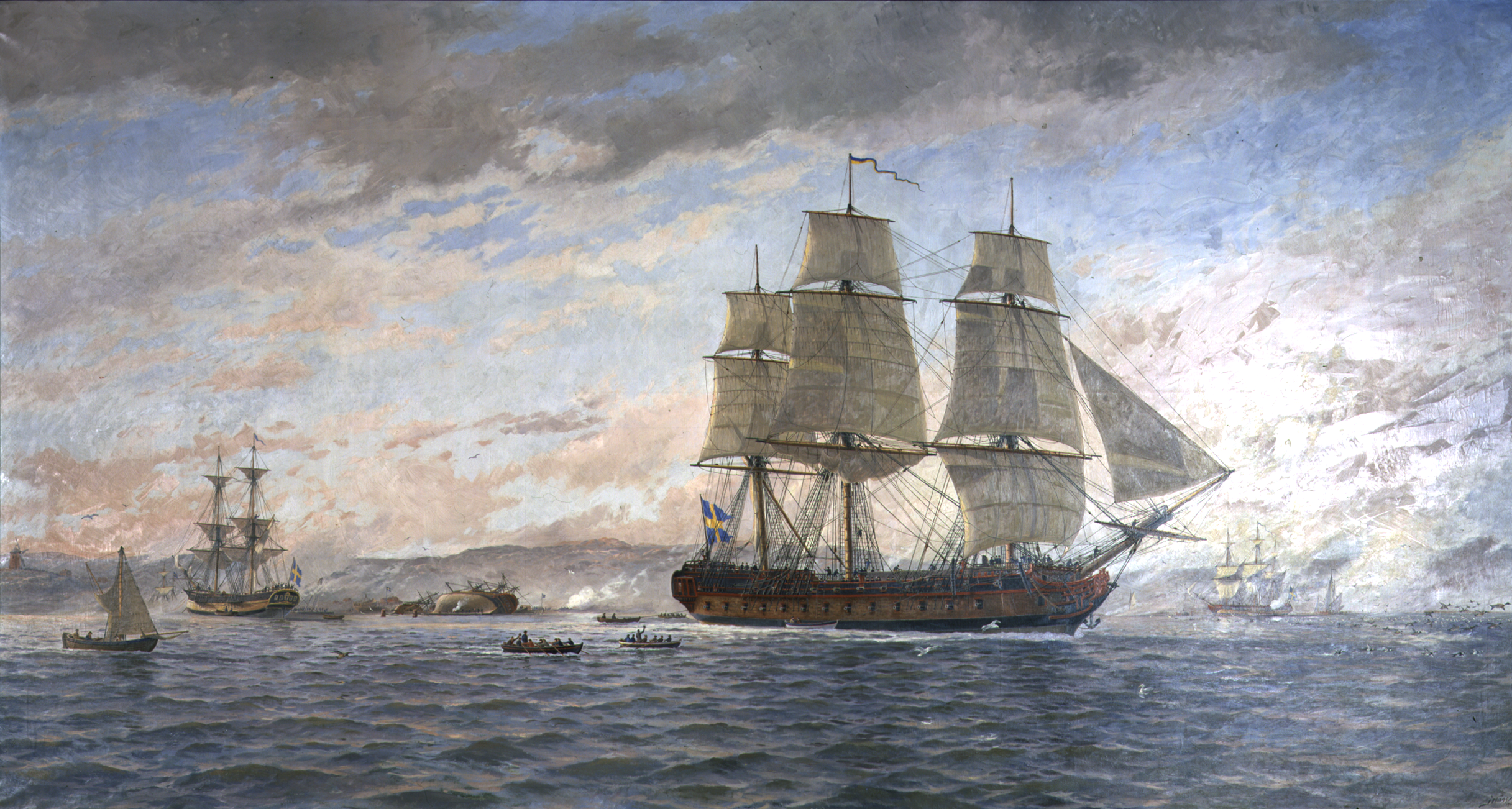
Oil painting of the ship of the line Wasa during her time with the Swedish East India Company

=== Archipelago frigate Disa ===
Disa was a smaller kind of archipelago frigate predominantly meant for use closer to the coast. Disa was 23.75 m (77 ft 11 in) long and 5.5 m (18 ft 1 in) wide. Her crew numbered 105 men and she carried 18 cannons.

=== Crown yacht Simpan ===
No known information remains about the ship's use or when it was built.

=== Brigantine Pollux ===
The brigantine Pollux was a two-masted sailing vessel launched at Karlskrona. She was 28.5 m (93 ft 6 in) long and 7.1 m (23 ft 4 in) wide, with 18 light cannons. She was sunk in the Djupasund strait in 1785.

== Sport diving ==
Several of the wrecks in the ship cemetery are attractive dive sites for recreational divers, and most of the wrecks are relatively accessible from the harbour of Ekenabben. The ship cemetery lies at a depth of 12 m (39 ft) on a bottom of sand and stone. In some places the oak timber from the wreck stands up several meters from the bottom. The wrecks lay in an east-western direction and span across the Djupasund strait. However, as the wreck cemetery is close to the active fishing port of Ekenabben diver down flags should be used, and escort boats are recommended.

The project to map the wrecks was done as a first step in the development of a planned scuba diving park. When finished the aim is that divers will be guided among the wrecks by signs. In the port of Ekenabben there is an exhibition with information signs about the ship cemetery and the six identified wrecks.

== Picture gallery ==
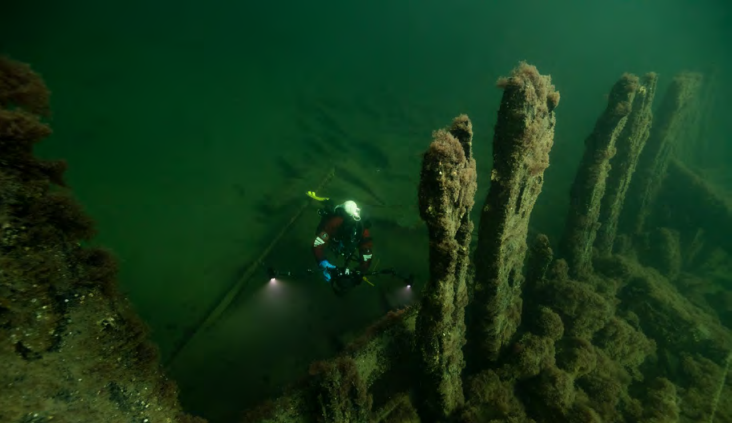
The hull of the ship of the line Södermanland/Grip/Gripen

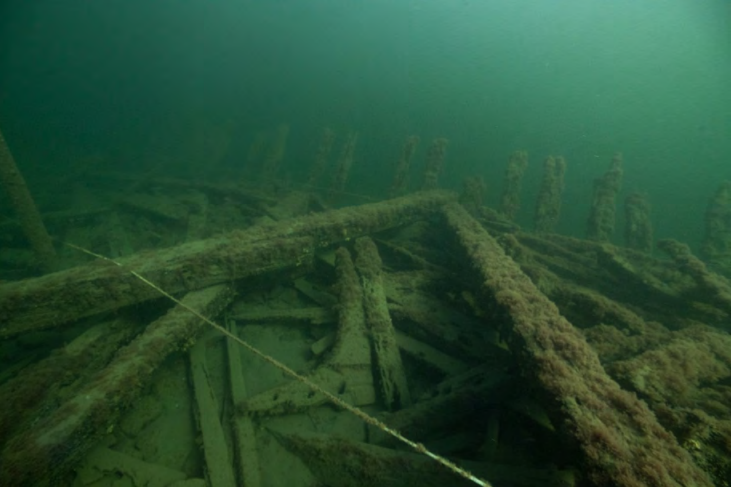
The wreck of the ship of the line Södermanland/Grip/Gripen

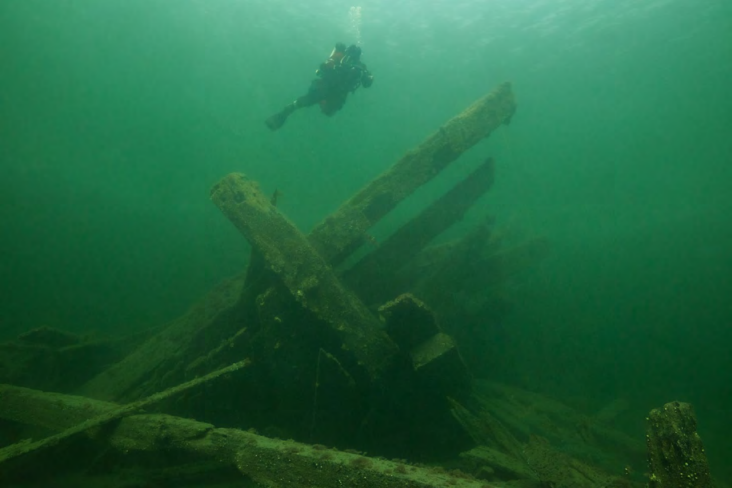
Stern of the wreck of the ship of the line Enigheten/ Kung Fredrik

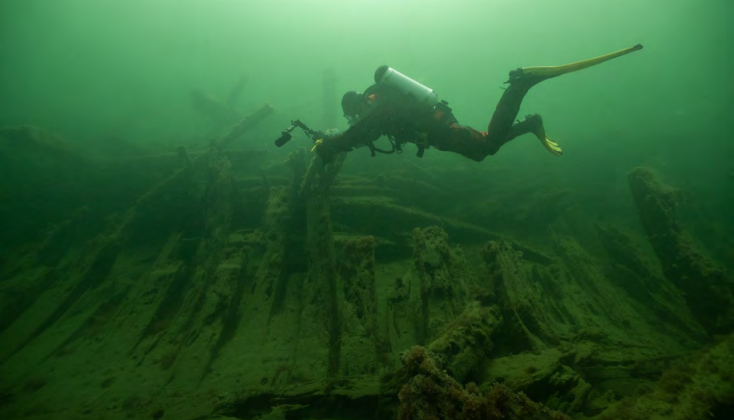
The wreck of the ship of the line Enigheten/Kung Fredrik

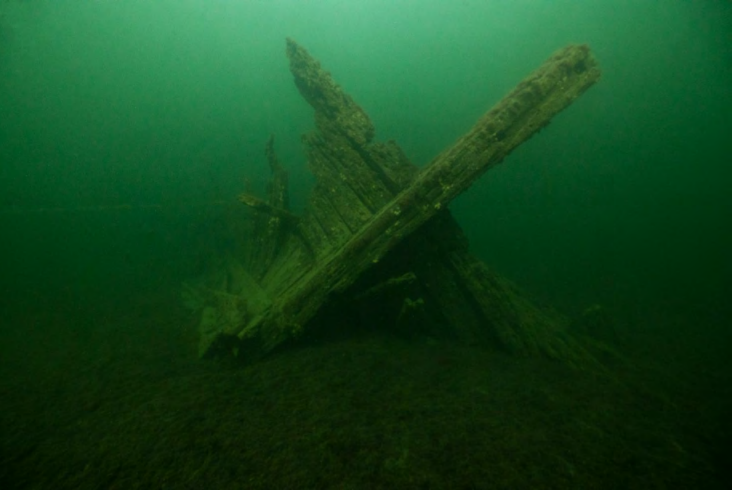
The wreck of the ship of the line Wasa

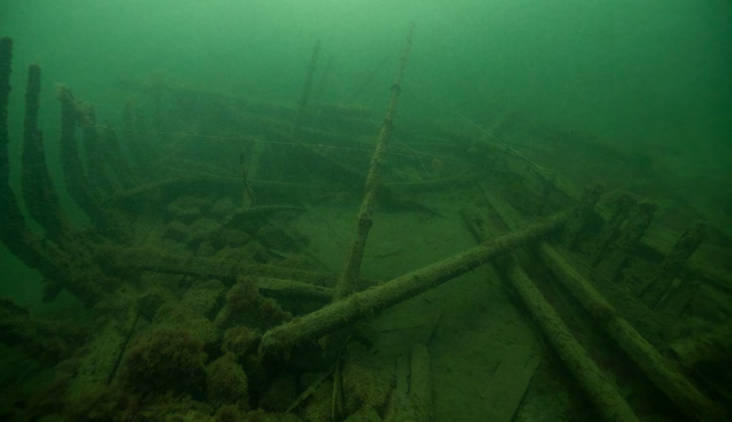
The wreck of the archipelago frigate Disa

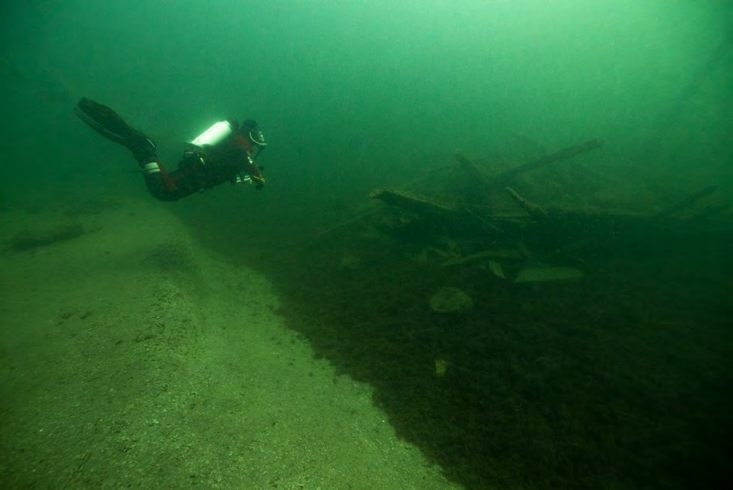
The wreck of crown yacht Simpan

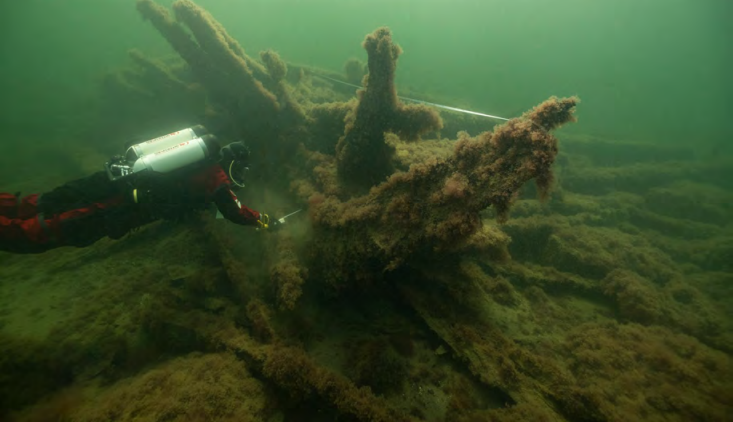
The bow of the wreck of brigantine Pollux
