= Bjärby =

- Village
- Location in Blekinge County
- Coordinates: 56°12′N 15°31′E
- Country: Sweden
- County: Blekinge County
- Municipality: Karlskrona Municipality
- Time zone: UTC+1 (CET)
  - Summer (DST): UTC+2 (CEST)

Bjärby is a village in Karlskrona Municipality, Blekinge County, southeastern Sweden.

== History ==
The settlement has existed since at least the mid-19th century, being mentioned in an 1861 almanac as part of the estate of Peter Adolph Werner.

== Geography ==
According to the 2000 census it had a population of 56 people. It is located beside the European route E22 approximately 1 kilometre (0.62 mi) west of Nättraby.
