= Sjuhalla =

- Location within Blekinge Location within Sweden
- Coordinates: 56°11′N 15°34′E
- Country: Sweden
- Province: Blekinge
- County: Blekinge County
- Municipality: Karlskrona Municipality

Area
  - Total: 0.46 km^{2} (0.18 sq mi)

Population (31 December 2010)
  - Total: 204
  - Density: 448/km^{2} (1,160/sq mi)
- Time zone: UTC+1 (CET)
  - Summer (DST): UTC+2 (CEST)

Sjuhalla is a locality situated in Karlskrona Municipality, Blekinge County, Sweden with 204 inhabitants in 2010.
