= Alnaryd =

- Village
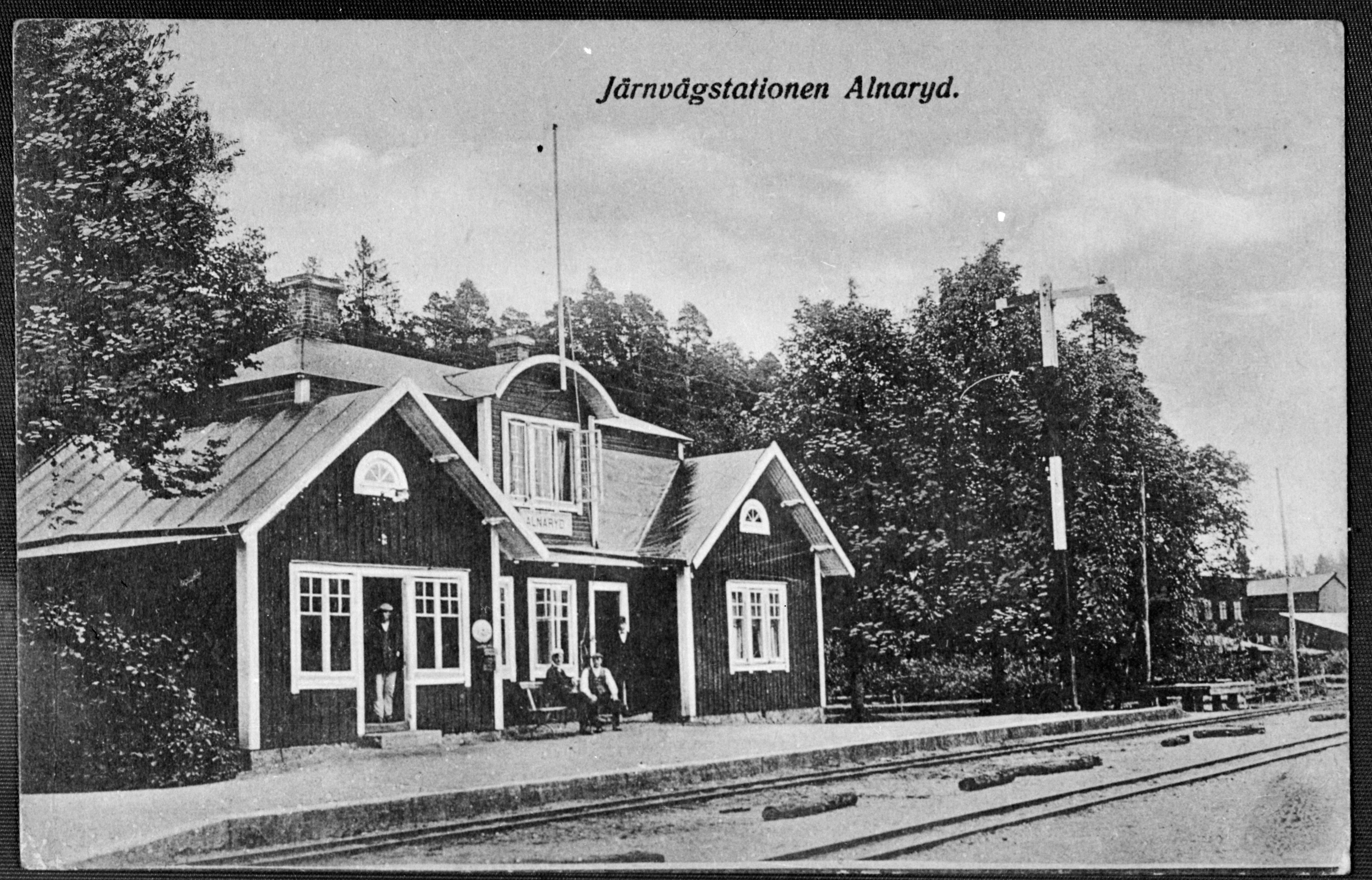
- The former railway station of Alnaryd

- Location in Blekinge County
- Coordinates: 56°20′N 15°26′E
- Country: Sweden
- County: Blekinge County
- Municipality: Karlskrona Municipality
- Time zone: UTC+1 (CET)
  - Summer (DST): UTC+2 (CEST)

Alnaryd is a village in Karlskrona Municipality, Blekinge County, southeastern Sweden. According to the 2010 census it had a population of 53 people.

On 25 April 1895, a railway was opened between Alnaryd and Nättraby. This railway was extended north to Eringsboda on 1 July 1905, and another railway was opened from Eringsboda to Älmeboda on 21 December 1910 by a different company. Because the latter was in practice an extension of the one from Nättraby to Eringsboda, it merged along with its owner into the Nättraby–Eringsboda railway the following year.
