= Alstugorna =

- Village
- Location in Blekinge County
- Coordinates: 56°13′N 15°35′E
- Country: Sweden
- County: Blekinge County
- Municipality: Karlskrona Municipality

Population (2010)
  - Total: 107
- Time zone: UTC+1 (CET)
  - Summer (DST): UTC+2 (CEST)

Alstugorna is a village in Karlskrona Municipality, Blekinge County, southeastern Sweden. According to the 2005 census, it had a population of 93 people.
