= Tving =

- Location within Blekinge Location within Sweden
- Coordinates: 56°18′N 15°27′E
- Country: Sweden
- Province: Blekinge
- County: Blekinge County
- Municipality: Karlskrona Municipality

Area
  - Total: 1.02 km^{2} (0.39 sq mi)

Population (31 December 2010)
  - Total: 459
  - Density: 449/km^{2} (1,160/sq mi)
- Time zone: UTC+1 (CET)
  - Summer (DST): UTC+2 (CEST)

Tving is a locality situated in Karlskrona Municipality, Blekinge County, Sweden with 459 inhabitants in 2010.

Near Tving, there is a 212 metres tall radio mast of the Swedish Navy used for LF-transmissions.
