= Sjötorp, Karlskrona Municipality =

Sjötorp
- Village
- Location in Blekinge County
- Coordinates: 56°11′6″N 15°41′0″E
- Country: Sweden
- County: Blekinge County
- Municipality: Karlskrona Municipality
- Time zone: UTC+1 (CET)
  - Summer (DST): UTC+2 (CEST)

Sjötorp is a village in Karlskrona Municipality, Blekinge County, southeastern Sweden. According to the 2005 census it had a population of 70 people.
