= Höryda =

- Village
- Location in Blekinge County
- Coordinates: 56°18′N 15°31′E
- Country: Sweden
- County: Blekinge County
- Municipality: Karlskrona Municipality
- Time zone: UTC+1 (CET)
  - Summer (DST): UTC+2 (CEST)

Höryda is a village in Karlskrona Municipality, Blekinge County, southeastern Sweden. It is surrounded by the Blekinge forest.
