= Tjurkö bracteates =

Early medieval Germanic amulets

The original Tjurkö 1 bracteate.

The Tjurkö Bracteates, listed by Rundata as DR BR75 and DR BR76, are two bracteates (medals or amulets) found on Tjurkö, Eastern Hundred, Blekinge, Sweden, bearing Elder Futhark runic inscriptions in Proto-Norse.

== Description ==
The Tjurkö bracteates were discovered in 1817 near Tjurkö when cultivating, for the first time, a field on a stony hill. The bracteates were found in the roots of the grass among the rocks. Also discovered with the bracteates was a gold coin of the Emperor Theodosius II of the Eastern Roman Empire that has been dated to 443 AD.

The Tjurkö 1 bracteate is dated to the Germanic Iron Age between 400 and 650 AD and is now at the Swedish Museum of National Antiquities (SHM 1453:25). It is a typical C-bracteate, similar to the Vadstena bracteate, and shows a stylized head in the center above a horse and beneath a bird. This iconography is usually interpreted as depicting an early form of the Norse pagan god Odin with his associated animals, a horse and a raven.

== Inscription ==
=== Tjurkö 1 bracteate ===
Detail of the top of Tjurkö 1.

The inscription of the Tjurkö 1 bracteate reads:

ᚹᚢᚱᛏᛖ ᚱᚢᚾᛟᛉ ᚨᚾ ᚹᚨᛚᚺᚨᚲᚢᚱᚾᛖ ᛫᛫ ᚺᛖᛚᛞᚨᛉ ᚲᚢᚾᛁᛗᚢᚾᛞᛁᚢ ᛫᛫᛫
wurte runoz an walhakurne ·· heldaz kunimudiu ···
Wurte runoz an walhakurne {} Heldaz Kunimundiu. {}
U Heldaz wrought runes on 'the foreign grain' for Kunimunduz.

There is a consensus that walha-kurne is a compound word referring to the bracteate itself, and that walha (cognate with Modern English Welsh) means "foreign, non-Germanic" - here perhaps more specifically "Roman" or "Gallic." However, differing explanations have been proposed for the second element kurne. According to one interpretation, kurne is the dative singular of kurna (cognate with Modern English corn), and walha-kurne "Roman or Gallic grain" is a kenning for "gold;" cf. the compounds valhöll, valrauðr and valbaugar in the Old Norse poem Atlakviða. This may refer to the melting of solidi as source of the gold for the bracteate. An alternative interpretation of the second element sees kurne as an early loan from Latin corona "crown," but this is now considered to be unlikely since "crowns" as currency appear only in medieval times, from images of crowns minted on the coins' faces. The personal name Heldaz is derived from *held- "battle" (Old English hild, Old Norse hildr, etc.), while Kunimundiu (dative singular of Kunimunduz) is from kuni- "kin" (which appears with connotations of royalty as the first element of Old English compounds, cf. Modern English king) and mund- "protection."

=== Tjurkö 2 bracteate ===
The Tjurkö 2 bracteate (DR BR76, IK185) is dated to the same period and has an inscription of just three runes that read ota, which translates as "fear." This formulistic word is also used on other bracteates such as DR IK55 (Fjärestad), DR IK152 (unknown location in Skåne), and DR IK578 (Gadegård).
