= Färmanstorp =

- Village
- Location in Blekinge County
- Coordinates: 56°10′42″N 15°29′28″E
- Country: Sweden
- County: Blekinge County
- Municipality: Karlskrona Municipality
- Time zone: UTC+1 (CET)
  - Summer (DST): UTC+2 (CEST)

Färmanstorp is a village in Karlskrona Municipality, Blekinge County, southeastern Sweden. According to the 2005 census it had a population of 140 people.
