= Björkeryd =

- Village
- Location in Blekinge County
- Coordinates: 56°15′28″N 15°30′37″E
- Country: Sweden
- County: Blekinge County
- Municipality: Karlskrona Municipality
- Time zone: UTC+1 (CET)
  - Summer (DST): UTC+2 (CEST)

Björkeryd is a village in Karlskrona Municipality, Blekinge County, southeastern Sweden. According to the 2000 census it had a population of 106 people.
