= Gunnar Torhamn =

Swedish painter

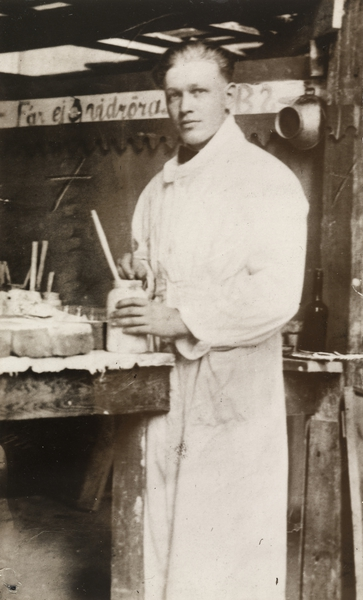
- Gunnar Torhamn in 1925
- Born: 21 December 1894; Torhamn, Sweden
- Died: 2 February 1965 (aged 70); Stockholm, Sweden
- Occupation: Painter

Josef Gunnar Torhamn, born Olsson (21 December 1894 – 2 February 1965), was a Swedish painter and sculptor, particularly noted for his work on church interiors.

== Biography ==
Torhamn was born in Konungshamn, Torhamn, Blekinge, the son of the coastal inspector Ander J. Olsson and his wife Elina (née Andersson). He showed artistic promise even in his childhood and went on to study at the Royal Academy of Arts from 1918 under Olle Hjortzberg among others. He was awarded the academy's royal medal in 1921 and again in 1924. In 1925 he was awarded a large travel bursary and up to 1928 visited France, Italy and North Africa.

Torhamn became a noted monumental artist, especially for church decorations such as frescoes, altarpieces and crucifixes in a traditional style. The first major project of this sort, which helped establish his career, was in the Högalid Church in Stockholm, on which his former tutor Olle Hjortzberg also worked, where he created a triumphal cross in 1922–1923, and later the frescoes in the baptistry.

His prolific easel paintings covered a varied range of subjects, but he principally depicted the coastal landscapes of Blekinge as well as sacred themes. He had one-man exhibitions in Kalmar in 1934 and Malmö in 1944, among others, and participated in exhibitions at the Kulturen museum in Lund in 1929, and the Stockholm Exhibition of 1930, as well as in exhibitions of modern religious art in Eksjö in 1948 and Vetlanda in 1949. His work was part of the painting event in the art competition at the 1936 Summer Olympics.

Torhamn's work is represented in, among other repositories, the collections of the Moderna Museet in Stockholm, the Archive of Decorative Art (Arkiv för dekorativ konst) in Lund, the Kalmar Art Museum (Kalmar konstmuseum) and the Kalmar Provincial Museum (Kalmar läns museum).

In 1923 he married the artist Ingegerd Sjöstrand, better known as Ingegerd Torhamn, with whom he had two sons, the graphic artist Staffan Torhamn and the writer Urban Torhamn. He died in Stockholm in 1965 and is buried in Torhamn.

== Gallery ==
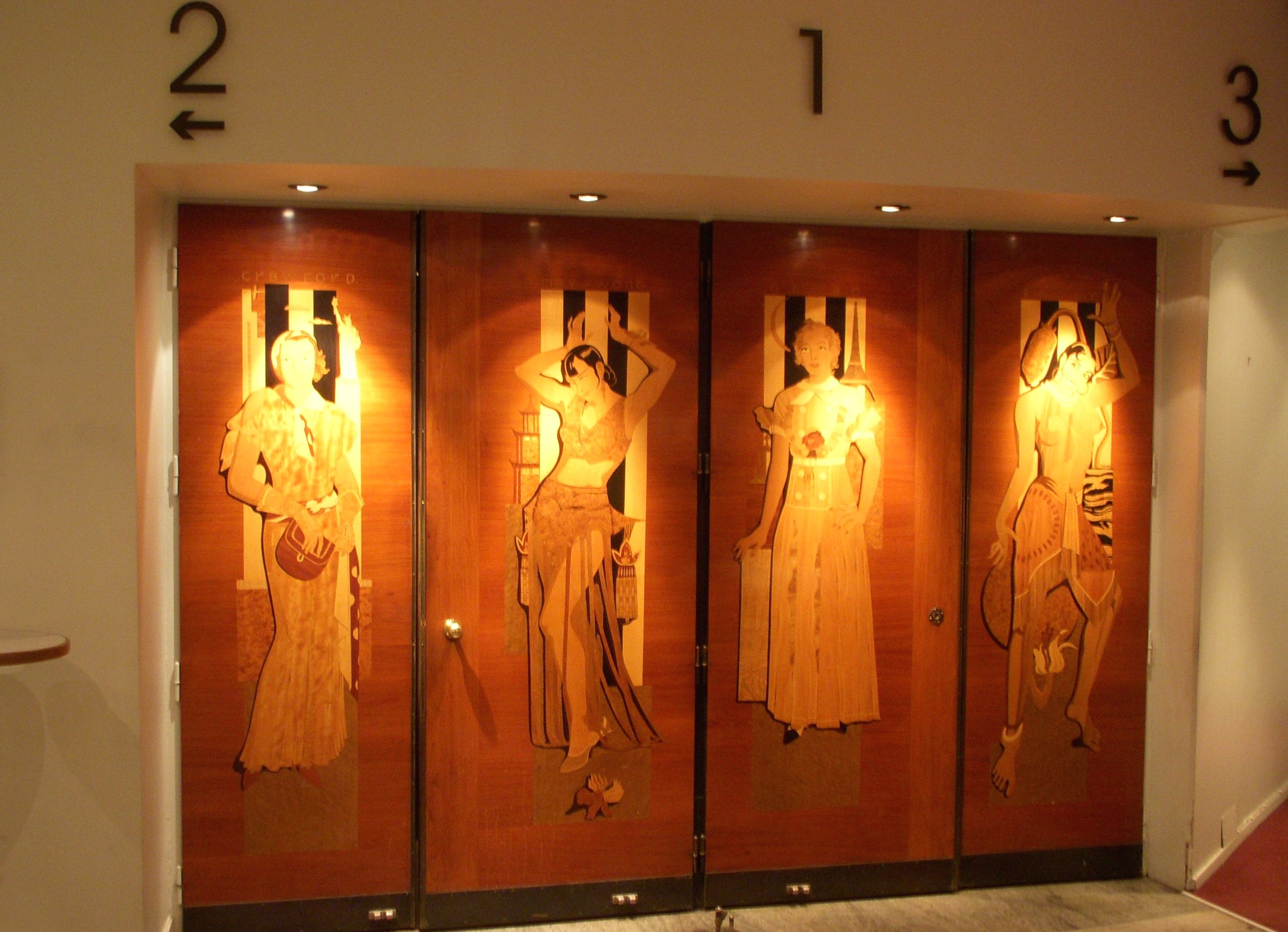
Intarsia work for the Grand Cinema in Stockholm in 1933. Gunnar Torhamn symbolized four continents through depictions of famous film actors: (from left) Joan Crawford for America, Anna May Wong for Asia, Greta Garbo for Europe and a lightly dressed Josephine Baker represented Africa.

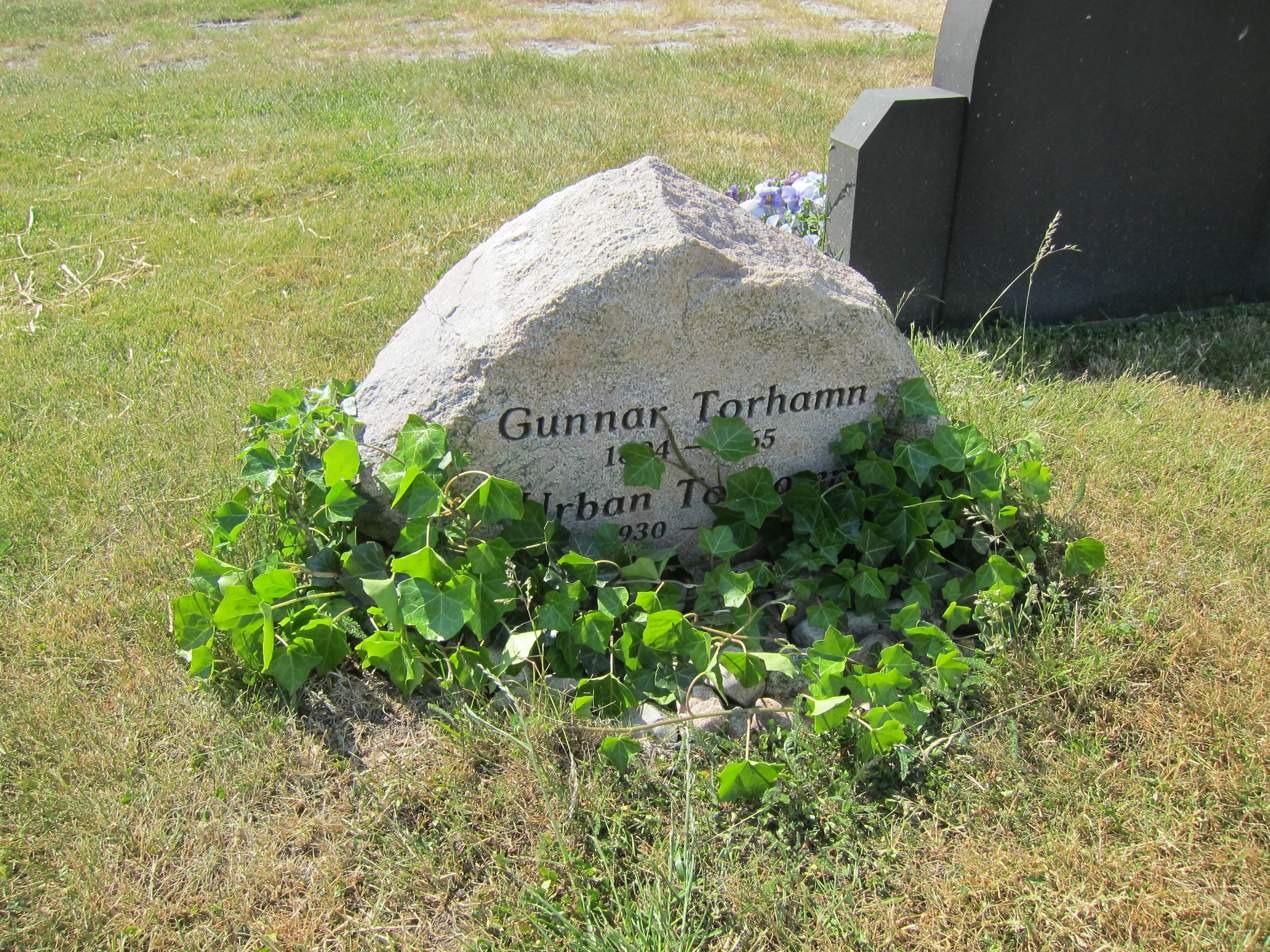
Memorial stone for Gunnar Torhamn and Urban Torhamn placed in Torhamn's church cemetery.

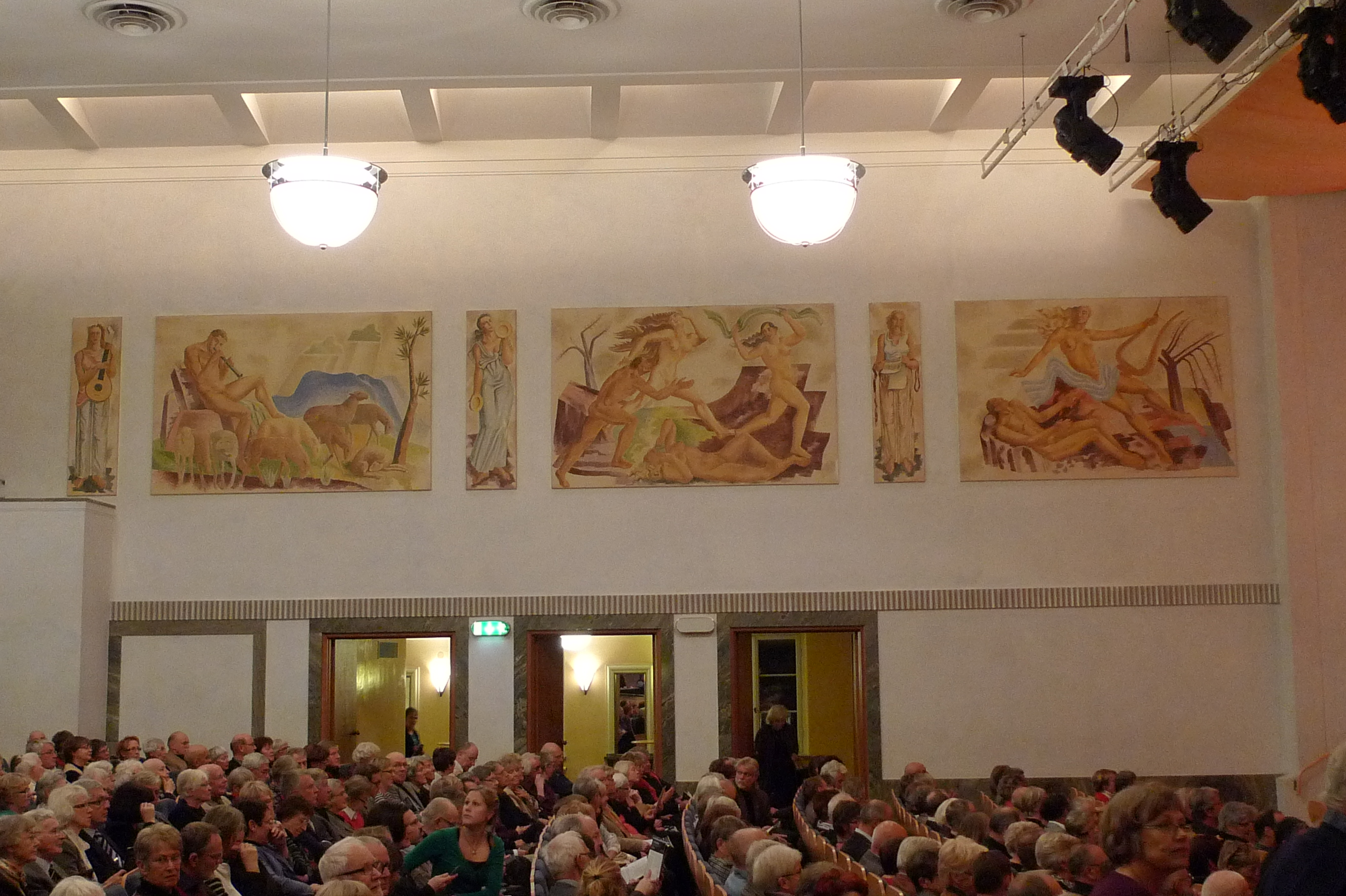
Örebro Concert Hall, frescoes with motifs reminiscent of classical-antique beauty ideals.

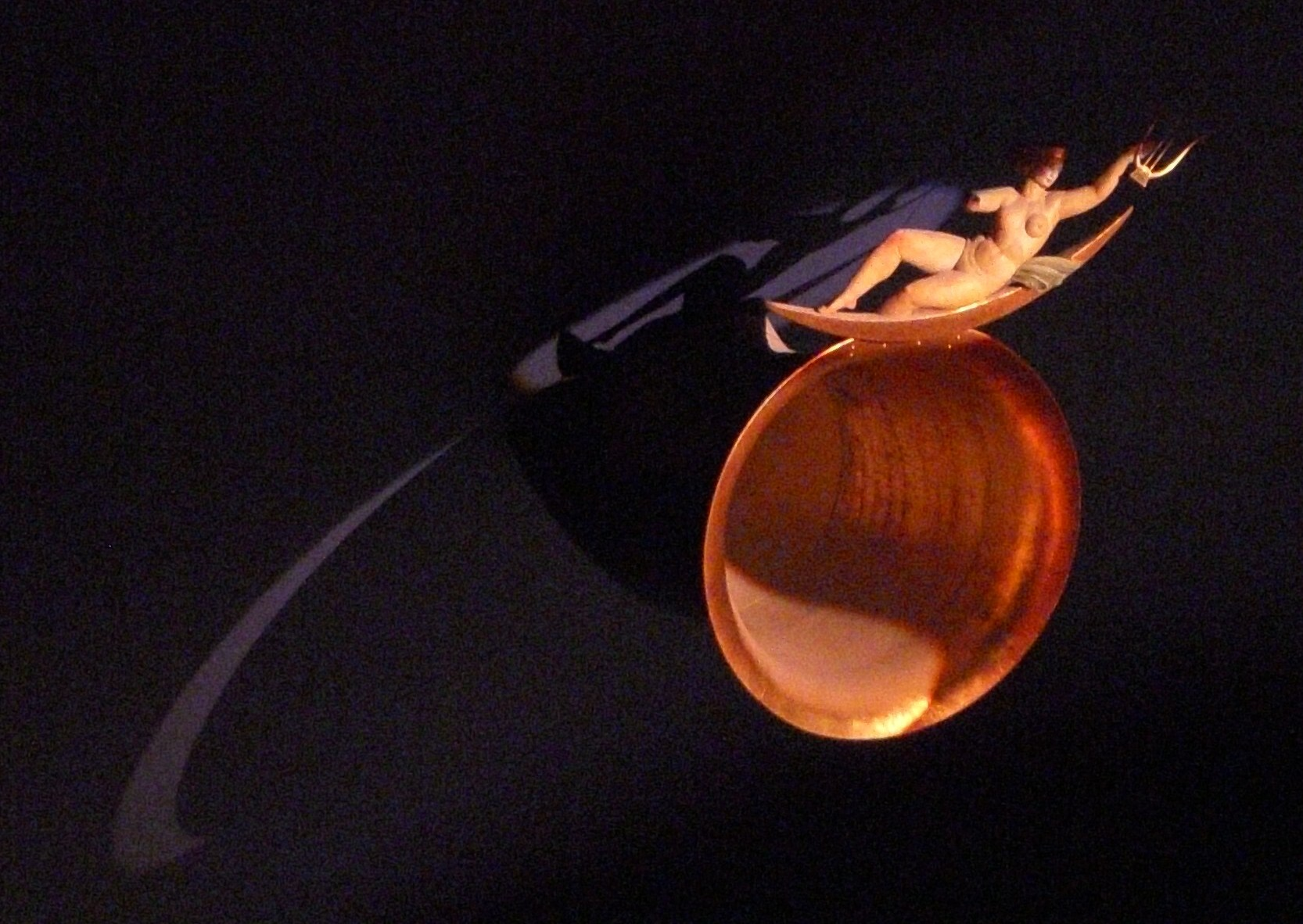
Skandia-Teatern in Stockholm, the figure in the salon's remote organ trumpet, 1924.

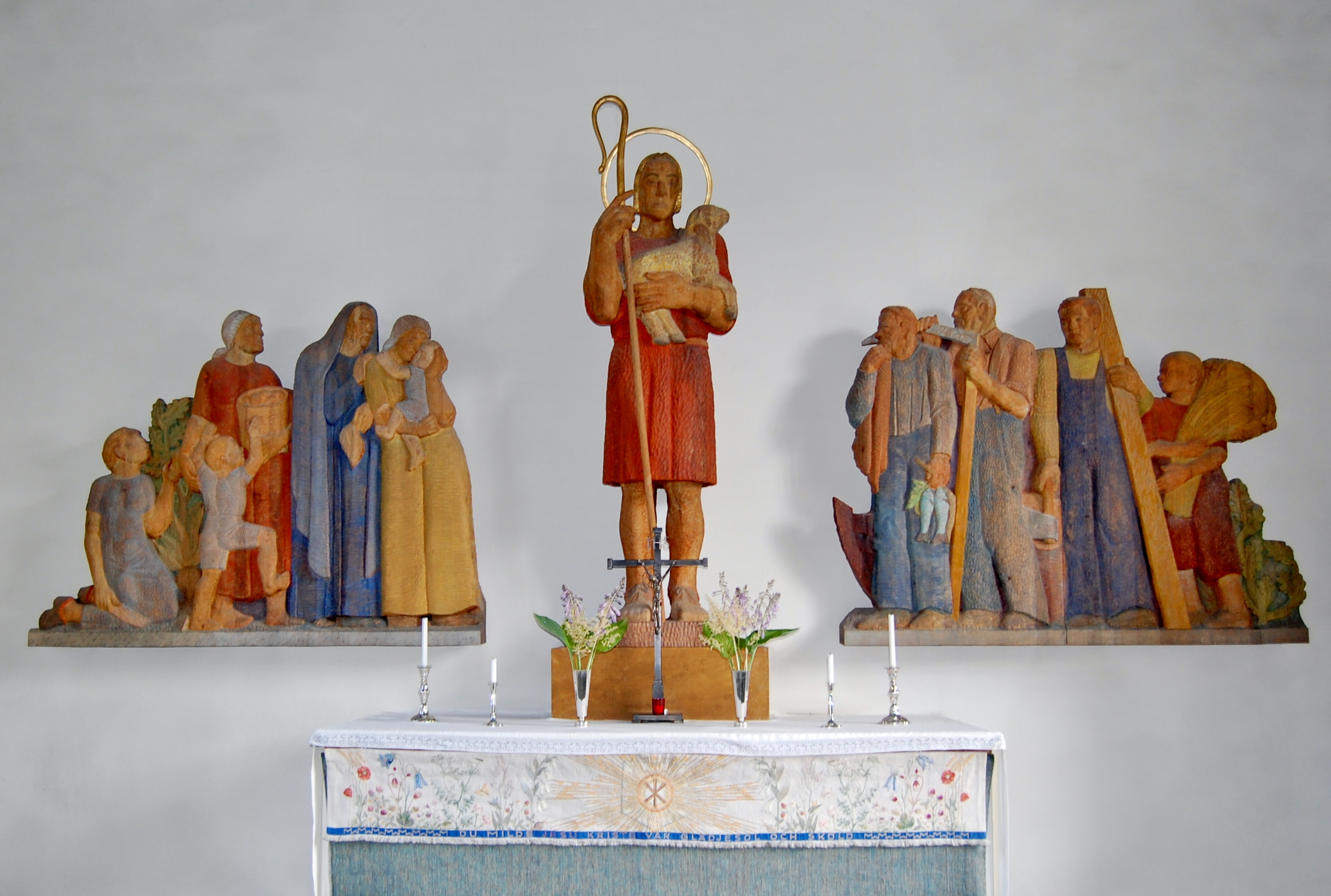
Sculpture suite in Söderåkra church, The good shepherd, made in 1947.

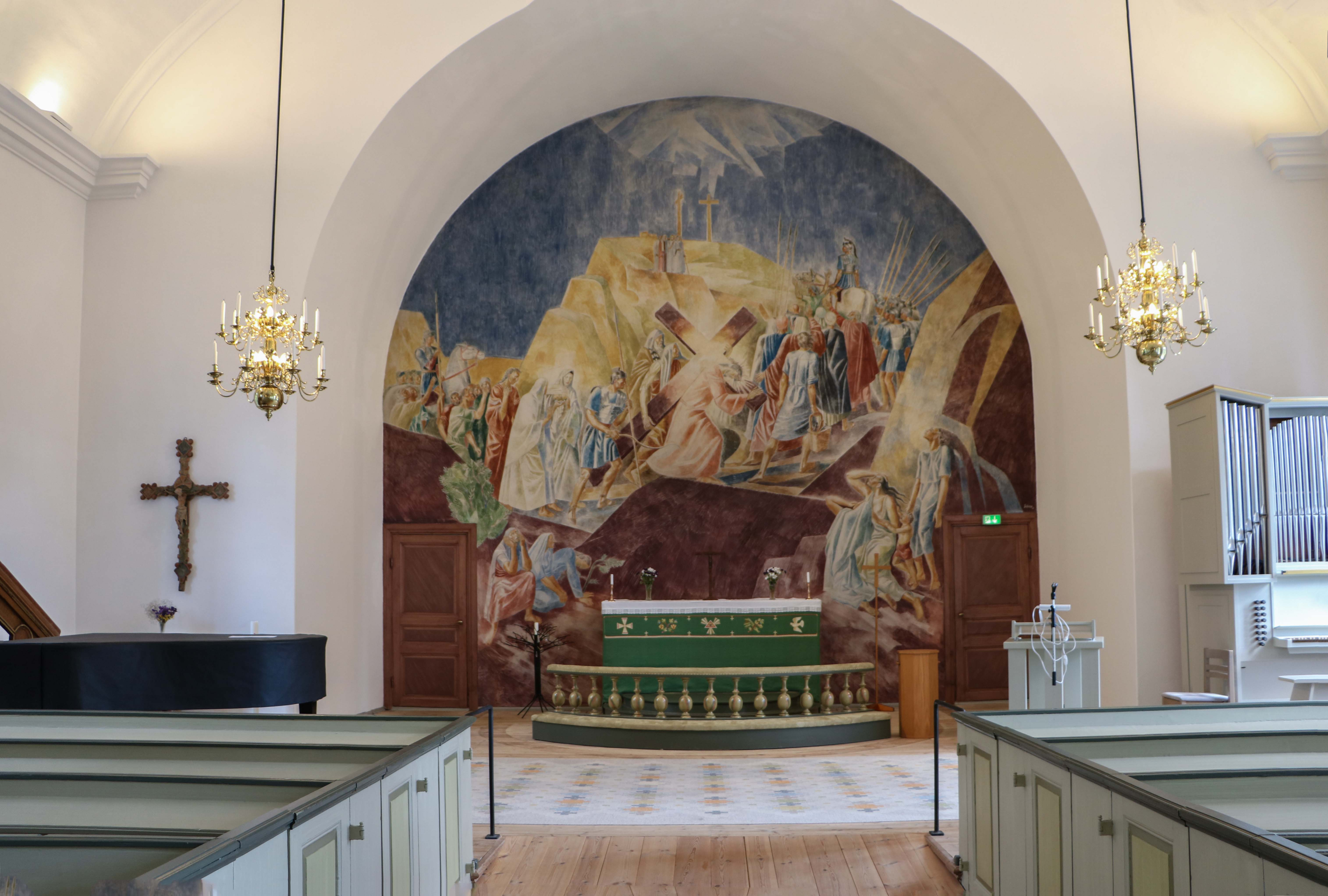
Choir wall, Christ carries the cross, Lösens church.

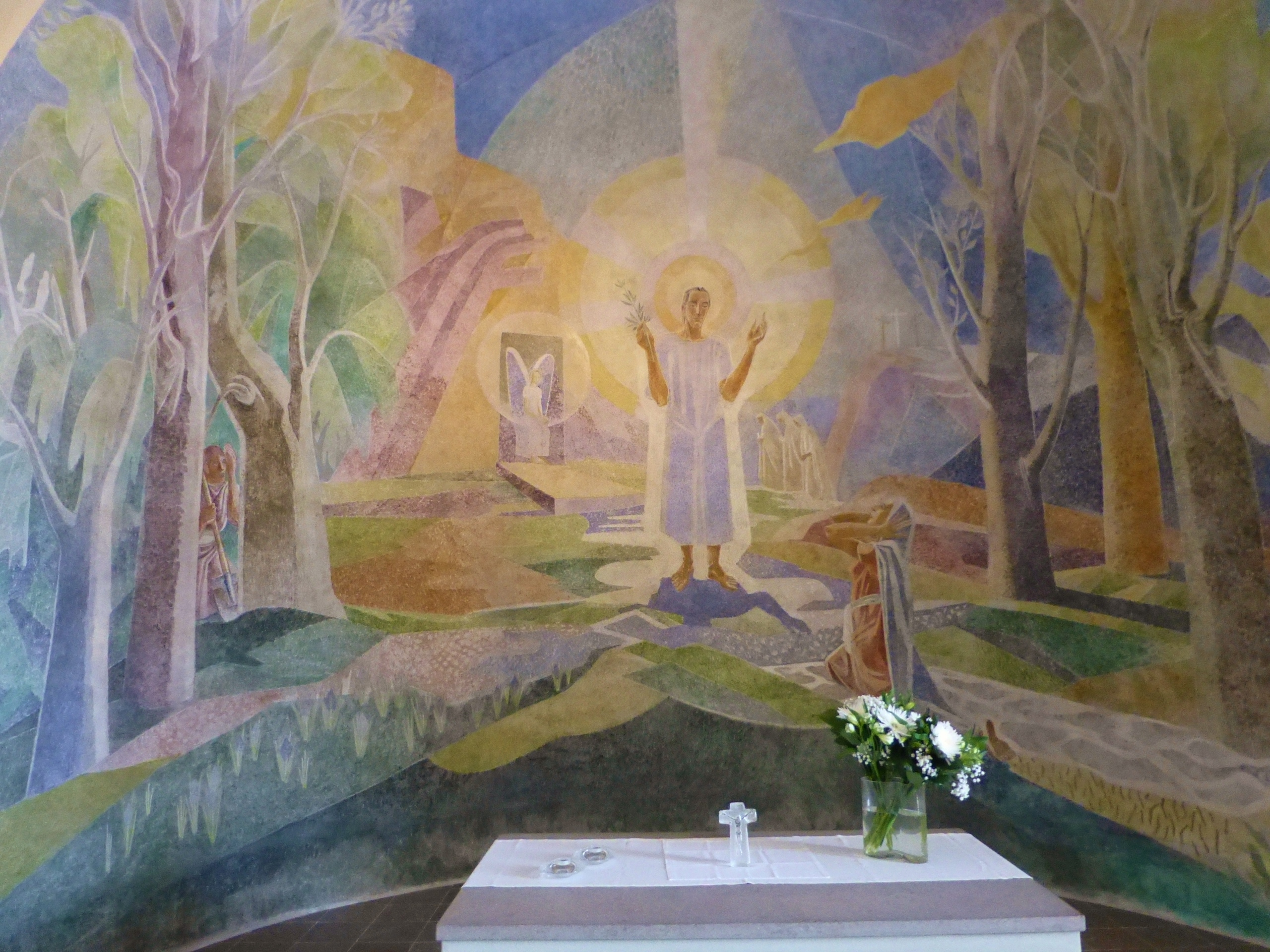
Resurrection of Christ, Listerby church.
