= Fågelmara =

- Location within Blekinge Location within Sweden
- Coordinates: 56°15′N 15°57′E
- Country: Sweden
- Province: Blekinge
- County: Blekinge County
- Municipality: Karlskrona Municipality

Area
  - Total: 0.71 km^{2} (0.27 sq mi)

Population (31 December 2010)
  - Total: 374
  - Density: 524/km^{2} (1,360/sq mi)
- Time zone: UTC+1 (CET)
  - Summer (DST): UTC+2 (CEST)

Fågelmara is a locality situated in Karlskrona Municipality, Blekinge County, Sweden with 374 inhabitants in 2010.

Fågelmara is the location of the largest ketchup factory in the Nordic countries as of 2020, owned by Orkla Foods. Initial plans to move production there from Rygge, Norway were made in April 2016.
