= Grönadal =

- Village
- Location in Blekinge County
- Coordinates: 56°11′N 15°30′E
- Country: Sweden
- County: Blekinge County
- Municipality: Karlskrona Municipality
- Time zone: UTC+1 (CET)
  - Summer (DST): UTC+2 (CEST)

Grönadal is a village in Karlskrona Municipality, Blekinge County, situated on the southern coast of Sweden. According to the 2005 census, the village had a population of 78 people.
