= Nättrabyån =

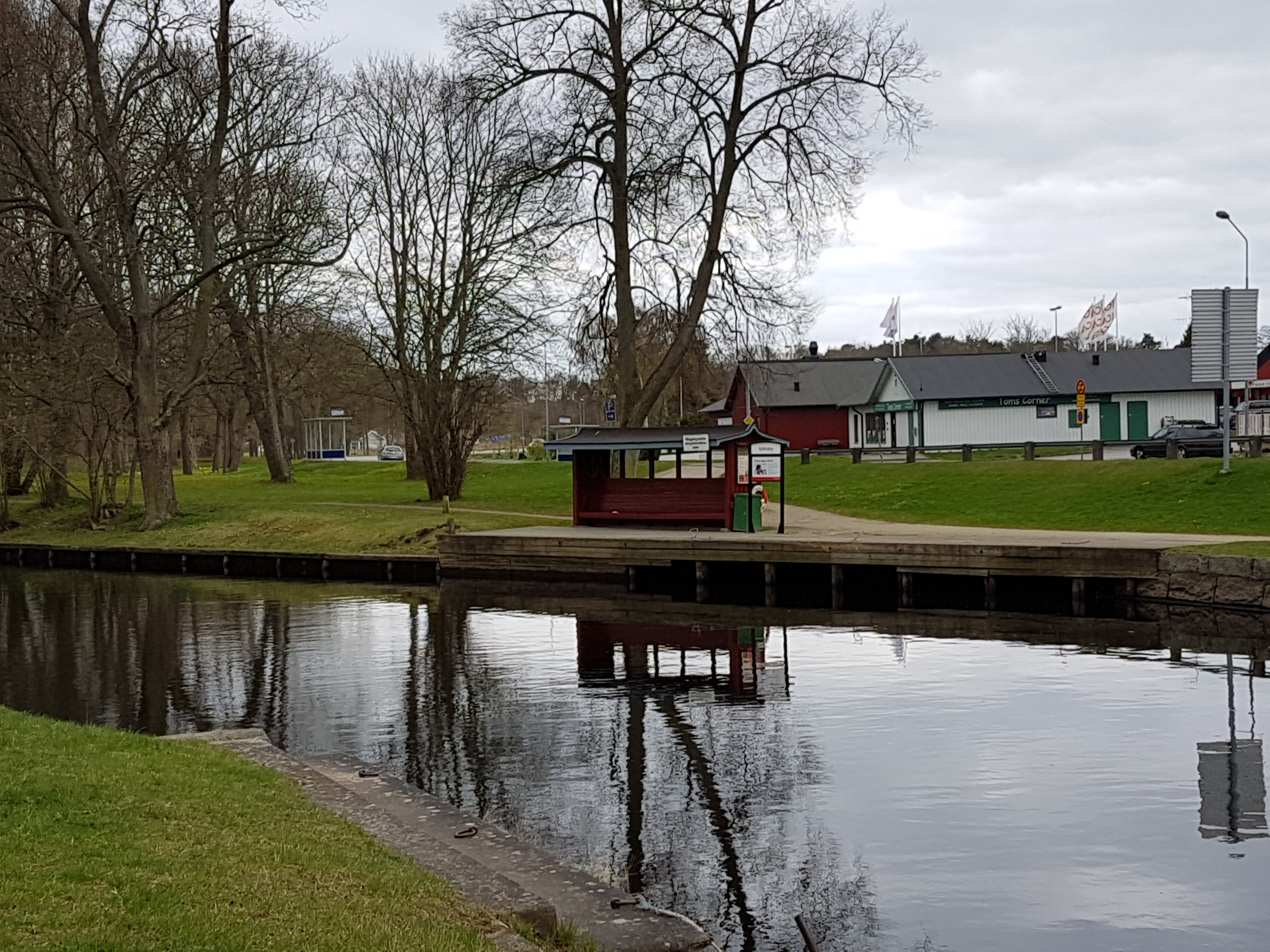

Location
- Country: Sweden

Physical characteristics
- Mouth
  - location: Vrängö
  - coordinates: 56°11′23″N 15°32′41″E
  - elevation: 0m
- Length: 60 km (37 mi)
- Basin size: 443.6 km^{2} (171.3 sq mi)
- Discharge
  - average: 3.5 m^{3}/s (120 cu ft/s)

Nättrabyån is a river in Sweden. It flows through the village of Nättraby and drains into the Baltic Sea in the area of the Blekinge archipelago.
