= Spjutsbygd =

- Location within Blekinge Location within Sweden
- Coordinates: 56°19′N 15°35′E
- Country: Sweden
- Province: Blekinge
- County: Blekinge County
- Municipality: Karlskrona Municipality

Area
  - Total: 0.52 km^{2} (0.20 sq mi)

Population (31 December 2010)
  - Total: 383
  - Density: 742/km^{2} (1,920/sq mi)
- Time zone: UTC+1 (CET)
  - Summer (DST): UTC+2 (CEST)

Spjutsbygd is a locality situated in Karlskrona Municipality, Blekinge County, Sweden with 383 inhabitants in 2010.

== Sports ==
The following sports clubs are located in Spjutsbygd:

- IF Trion
