= Fridlevstad =

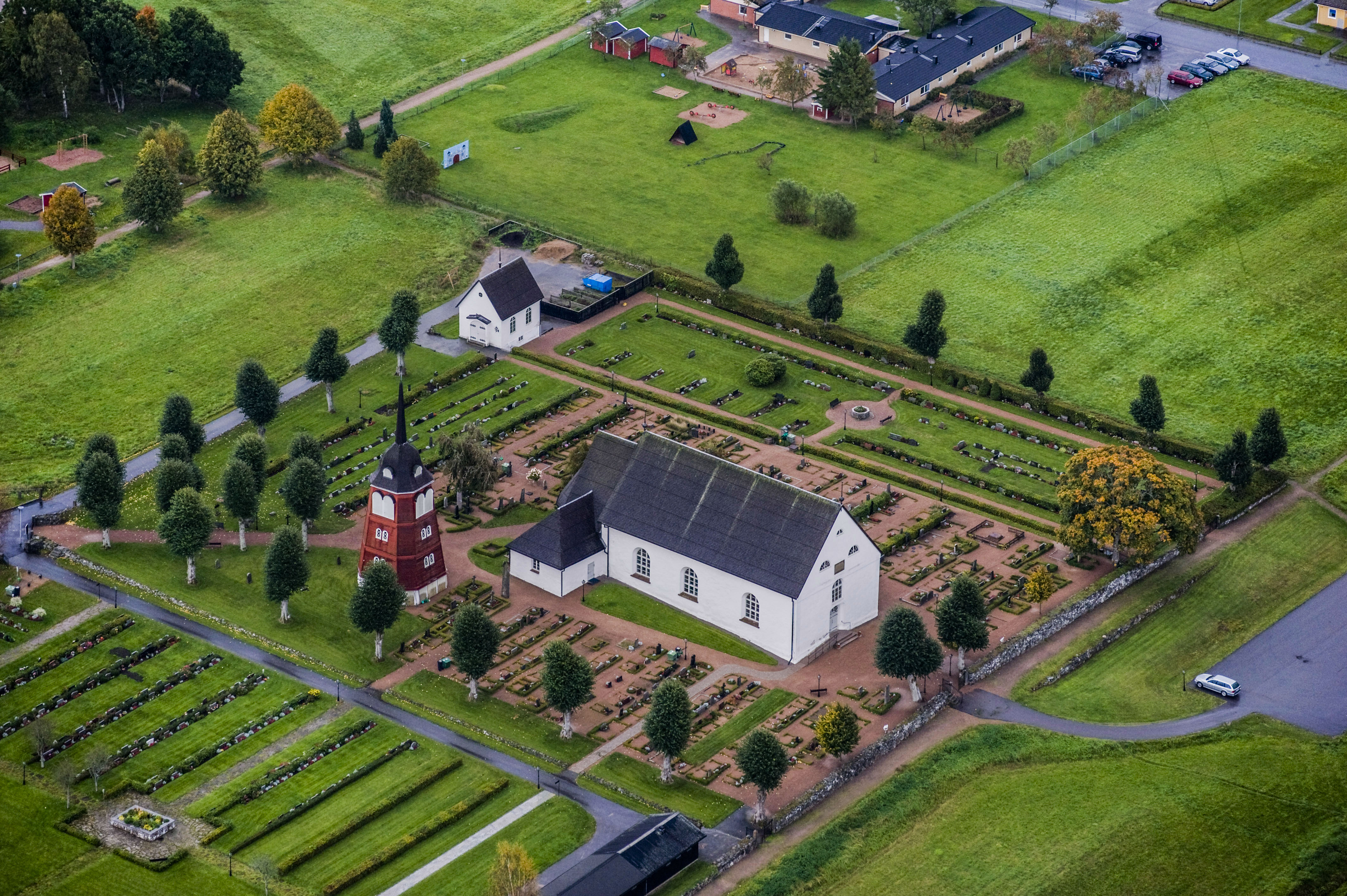

- Location within Blekinge Location within Sweden
- Coordinates: 56°16′N 15°30′E
- Country: Sweden
- Province: Blekinge
- County: Blekinge County
- Municipality: Karlskrona Municipality

Area
  - Total: 0.93 km^{2} (0.36 sq mi)

Population (31 December 2010)
  - Total: 713
  - Density: 765/km^{2} (1,980/sq mi)
- Time zone: UTC+1 (CET)
  - Summer (DST): UTC+2 (CEST)

Fridlevstad is a locality situated in Karlskrona Municipality, Blekinge County, Sweden with 713 inhabitants in 2010.
