= Skavkulla och Skillingenäs =

- Location within Blekinge Location within Sweden
- Coordinates: 56°11′N 15°31′E
- Country: Sweden
- Province: Blekinge
- County: Blekinge County
- Municipality: Karlskrona Municipality

Area
  - Total: 0.89 km^{2} (0.34 sq mi)

Population (31 December 2010)
  - Total: 621
  - Density: 696/km^{2} (1,800/sq mi)
- Time zone: UTC+1 (CET)
  - Summer (DST): UTC+2 (CEST)

Skavkulla och Skillingenäs is a locality situated in Karlskrona Municipality, Blekinge County, Sweden, with 621 inhabitants in 2010.
