= Nävragöl =

- Location within Blekinge Location within Sweden
- Coordinates: 56°22′N 15°34′E
- Country: Sweden
- Province: Blekinge
- County: Blekinge County
- Municipality: Karlskrona Municipality

Area
  - Total: 0.32 km^{2} (0.12 sq mi)

Population (31 December 2010)
  - Total: 210
  - Density: 654/km^{2} (1,690/sq mi)
- Time zone: UTC+1 (CET)
  - Summer (DST): UTC+2 (CEST)

Nävragöl is a locality situated in Karlskrona Municipality, Blekinge County, Sweden with 210 inhabitants in 2010.
