= Nättraby =

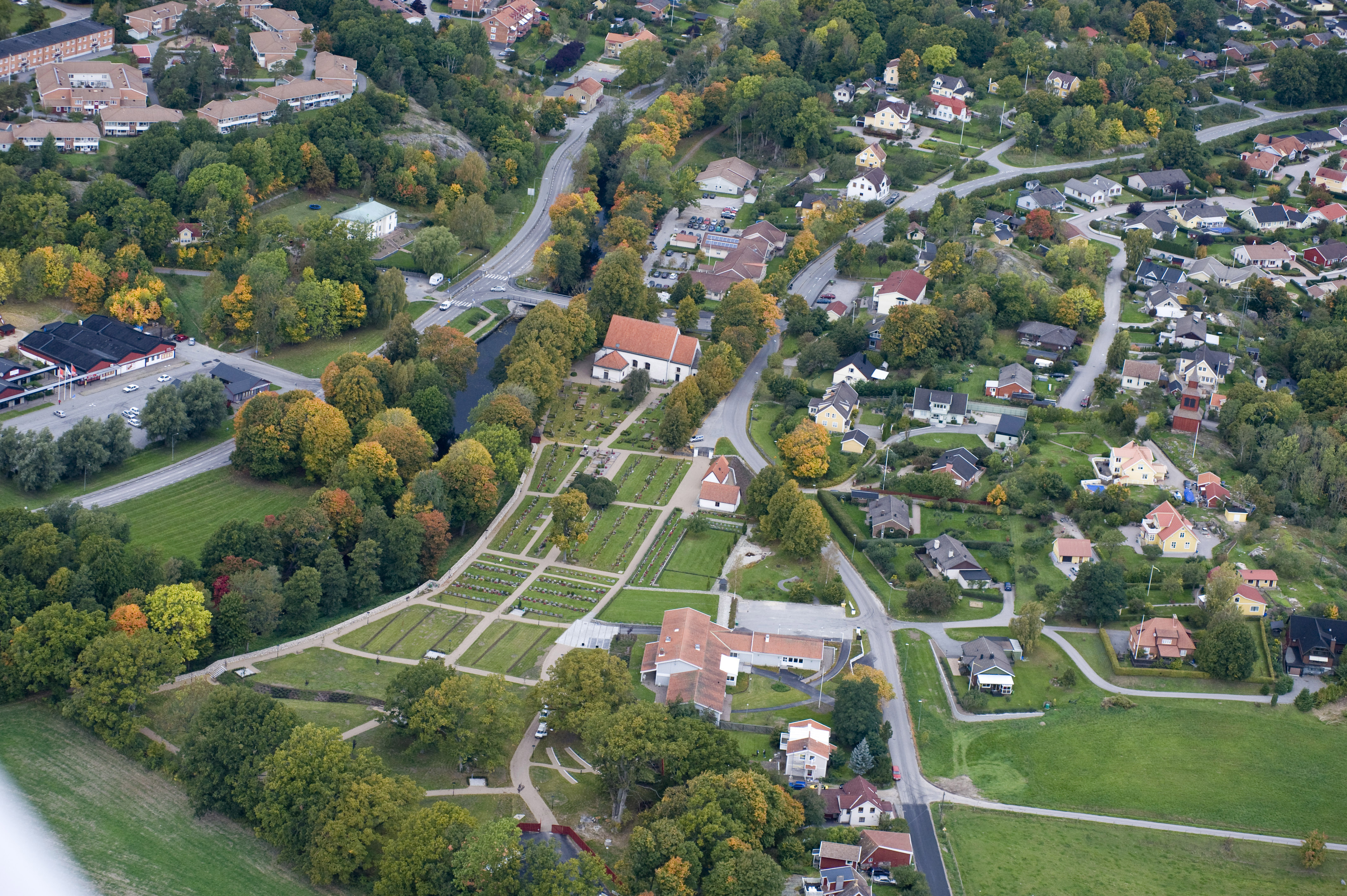

- Location within Blekinge Location within Sweden
- Coordinates: 56°12′N 15°31′E
- Country: Sweden
- Province: Blekinge
- County: Blekinge County
- Municipality: Karlskrona Municipality

Area
  - Total: 2.77 km^{2} (1.07 sq mi)

Population (31 December 2010)
  - Total: 3,109
  - Density: 1,123/km^{2} (2,910/sq mi)
- Time zone: UTC+1 (CET)
  - Summer (DST): UTC+2 (CEST)

Nättraby is a locality situated in Karlskrona Municipality, Blekinge County, Sweden with 3,109 inhabitants in 2010. Within the parish 1 kilometre (0.62 mi) to the west is the hamlet of Bjärby.

On 25 April 1895, a railway was opened between Nättraby and Alnaryd by the eponymous company based in Nättraby. This railway was extended north to Eringsboda on 1 July 1905. Another railway was opened from Eringsboda to Älmeboda on 21 December 1910 by a different company. Because the latter was in practice an extension of the one from Nättraby to Eringsboda, it merged along with its owner into the Nättraby–Eringsboda railway the following year.
