= IF Trion =

Swedish football club

- Full name: Idrottsföreningen Trion
- Founded: 1936
- Ground: Spjutsbygds IP; Spjutsbygd; Sweden
- Chairman: Bertil Corneliusson
- League: Division 4 Blekinge
Home colours

IF Trion is a Swedish football club located in Spjutsbygd.

== Background ==
IF Trion currently plays in Division 4 Blekinge which is the sixth tier of Swedish football. They play their home matches at the Spjutsbygds IP in Spjutsbygd.

The women's soccer team was played in the Swedish top division in 2002 and 2003.

The club is affiliated to Blekinge Fotbollförbund. IF Trion have competed in the Svenska Cupen on 13 occasions.

== Season to season ==
Season	Level	Division	Section	Position	Movements
2006*	Tier 7	Division 5	Blekinge	3rd	
2007	Tier 7	Division 5	Blekinge	7th	
2008	Tier 7	Division 5	Blekinge	5th	
2009	Tier 7	Division 5	Blekinge	1st	Promoted
2010	Tier 6	Division 4	Blekinge	6th	
2011	Tier 6	Division 4	Blekinge	5th	

* League restructuring in 2006 resulted in a new division being created at Tier 3 and subsequent divisions dropping a level.
