= AIK Atlas =

Swedish football club

- Full name: Atlet & Idrottsklubben Atlas
- Ground: Havsvallen; Sturkö; Sweden
- Chairman: Alf Magnusson
- League: Division 5 Blekinge
| Home colours | Away colours |

AIK Atlas is a Swedish football club located in Sturkö.

== Background ==
AIK Atlas currently plays in Division 4 Blekinge which is the sixth tier of Swedish football. They play their home matches at the Havsvallen in Sturkö.

The club is affiliated to Blekinge Fotbollförbund. AIK Atlas have competed in the Svenska Cupen on 9 occasions and have completed a total of 14 matches.

== Season to season ==
| Season | Level | Division | Section | Position | Movements |
|---|---|---|---|---|---|
| 1992 | Tier | Division 3 | Sydöstra Götaland | 5th | |
| 1993 | Tier 4 | Division 3 | Sydöstra Götaland | 3rd | |
| 1994 | Tier 4 | Division 3 | Sydöstra Götaland | 5th | |
| 1995 | Tier 4 | Division 3 | Sydöstra Götaland | 12th | Relegated |
| 1996 | Tier 5 | Division 4 | Blekinge | 2nd | Promotion Playoffs |
| 1997 | Tier 5 | Division 4 | Blekinge | 2nd | Promotion Playoffs – Promoted |
| 1998 | Tier 4 | Division 3 | Sydöstra Götaland | 9th | Relegation Playoffs – Relegated |
| 1999 | Tier 5 | Division 4 | Blekinge | 2nd | |
| 2000 | Tier 5 | Division 4 | Blekinge | 5th | |
| 2001 | Tier 5 | Division 4 | Blekinge | 12th | Relegation Playoffs – Relegated |
| 2002 | Tier 6 | Division 5 | Blekinge Östra | 1st | Promoted |
| 2003 | Tier 5 | Division 4 | Blekinge | 9th | |
| 2004 | Tier 5 | Division 4 | Blekinge | 9th | |
| 2005 | Tier 5 | Division 4 | Blekinge | 7th | |
| 2006* | Tier 6 | Division 4 | Blekinge | 6th | |
| 2007 | Tier 6 | Division 4 | Blekinge | 9th | |
| 2008 | Tier 6 | Division 4 | Blekinge | 8th | |
| 2009 | Tier 6 | Division 4 | Blekinge | 12th | Relegation Playoffs |
| 2010 | Tier 6 | Division 4 | Blekinge | 11th | |
| 2011 | Tier 6 | Division 4 | Blekinge | 11th | Relegated |

* League restructuring in 2006 resulted in a new division being created at Tier 3 and subsequent divisions dropping a level.
