= Torhamn =

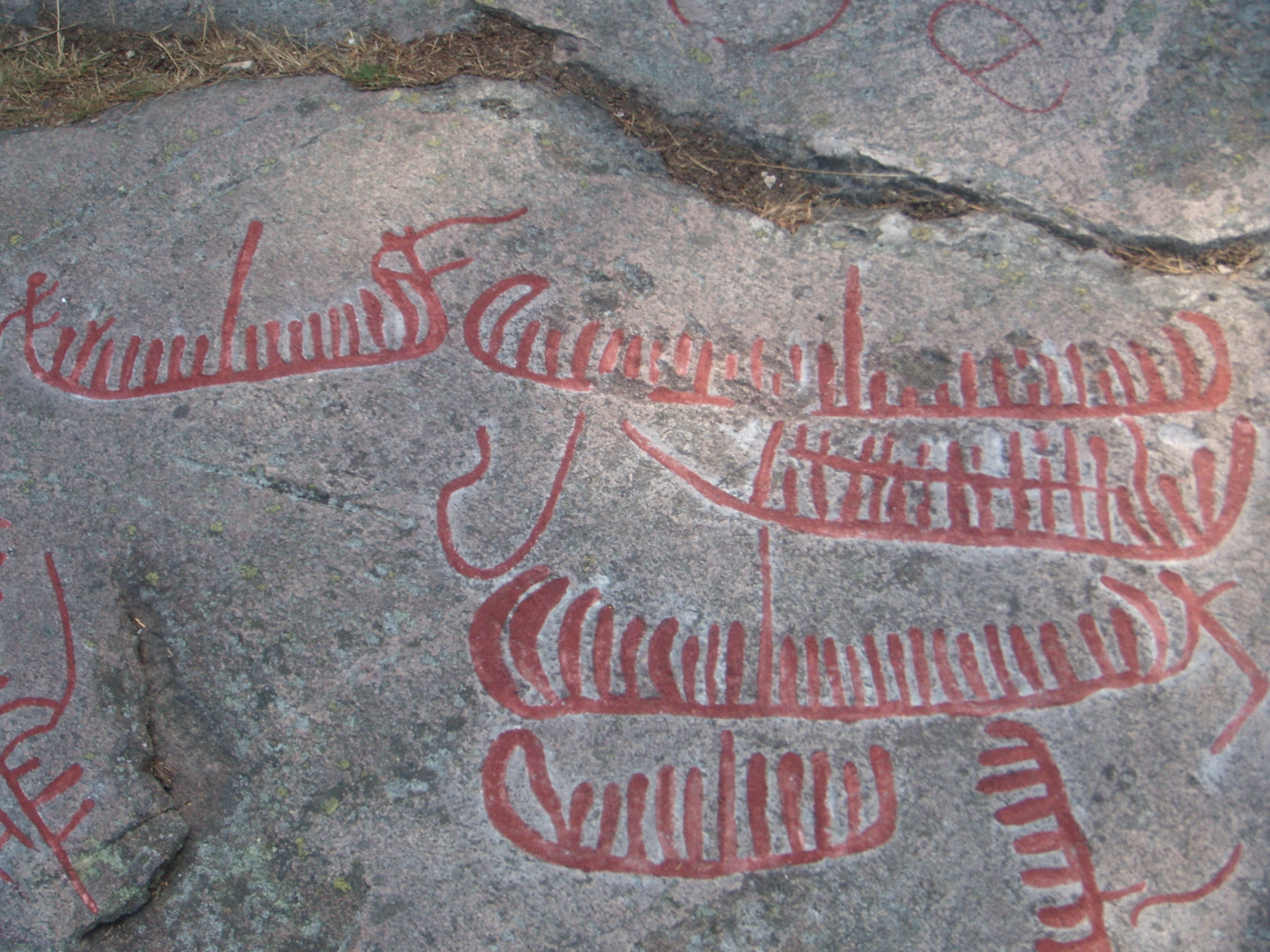
- Petroglyphs in Torhamn

- Location within Blekinge Location within Sweden
- Coordinates: 56°06′N 15°50′E
- Country: Sweden
- Province: Blekinge
- County: Blekinge County
- Municipality: Karlskrona Municipality

Area
  - Total: 1.02 km^{2} (0.39 sq mi)

Population (31 December 2010)
  - Total: 423
  - Density: 414/km^{2} (1,070/sq mi)
- Time zone: UTC+1 (CET)
  - Summer (DST): UTC+2 (CEST)

Torhamn, also called Torrum, is a locality situated in Karlskrona Municipality, Blekinge County, Sweden with 423 inhabitants in 2010.

Torhamn lies at the furthest southeastern point of Sweden. It was known as Torrum until 1898. In the village there is a grocery store, and by the water a harbor where boats travel to and from the islands of the archipelago and to the municipality's center at Karlskrona. Torhamn is connected to Jämjö by bus.

The peninsula south of Torhamn is a popular site for birdwatching, particularly in spring and autumn. It was declared a nature reserve in 1977. The birdwatching station is located on the peninsula south of the village. Many species of birds fly by the station on the way north through Kalmarsund or south to Östersjön.

Just north of Torhamn is Hästhallen (the Horse Hall), the site of bronze-age rock carvings that is the largest petroyglyph site in the region of Blekinge. There are 140 carvings in total at the archaeological site in seven different groups. Figures show eighty-five ships, two horses and riders, as well as deer (hjordjur), sun wheels, the soles of feet and skålgropar. The petroglyphs have been dated to about 1000 BCE.

Petroglyphs at Hästahallen, Torhamn
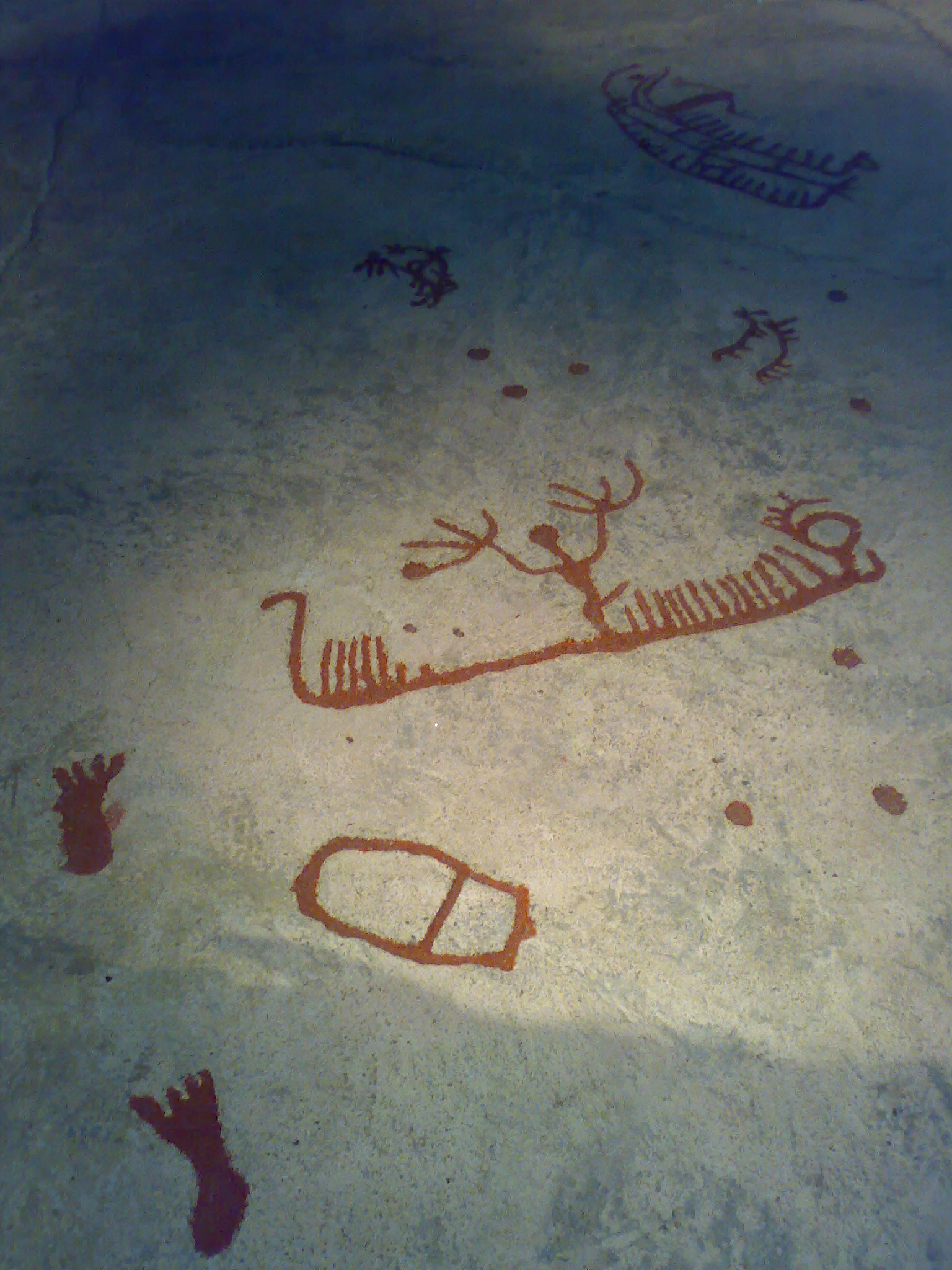
Rock carvings at Hästahallen

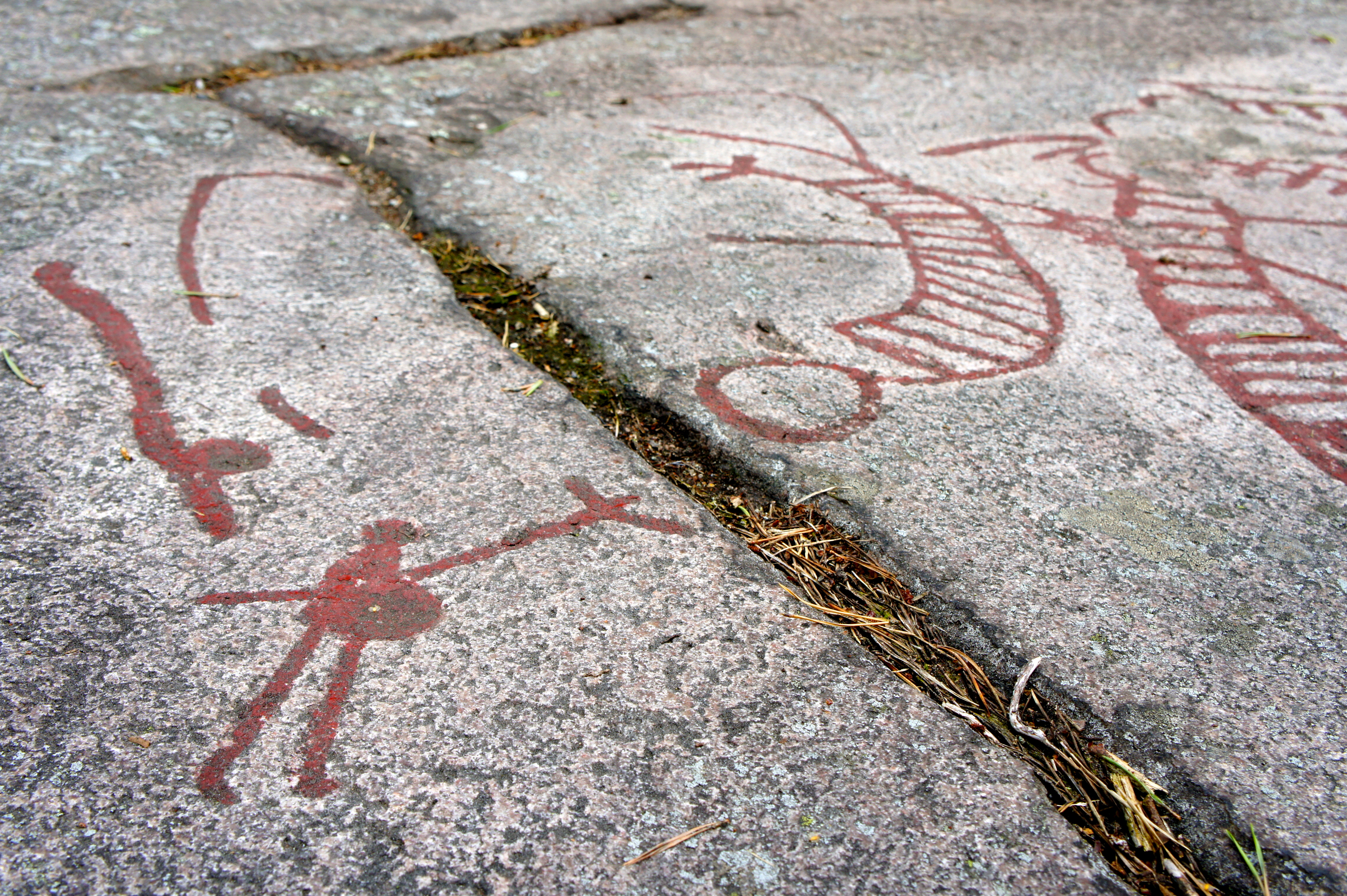

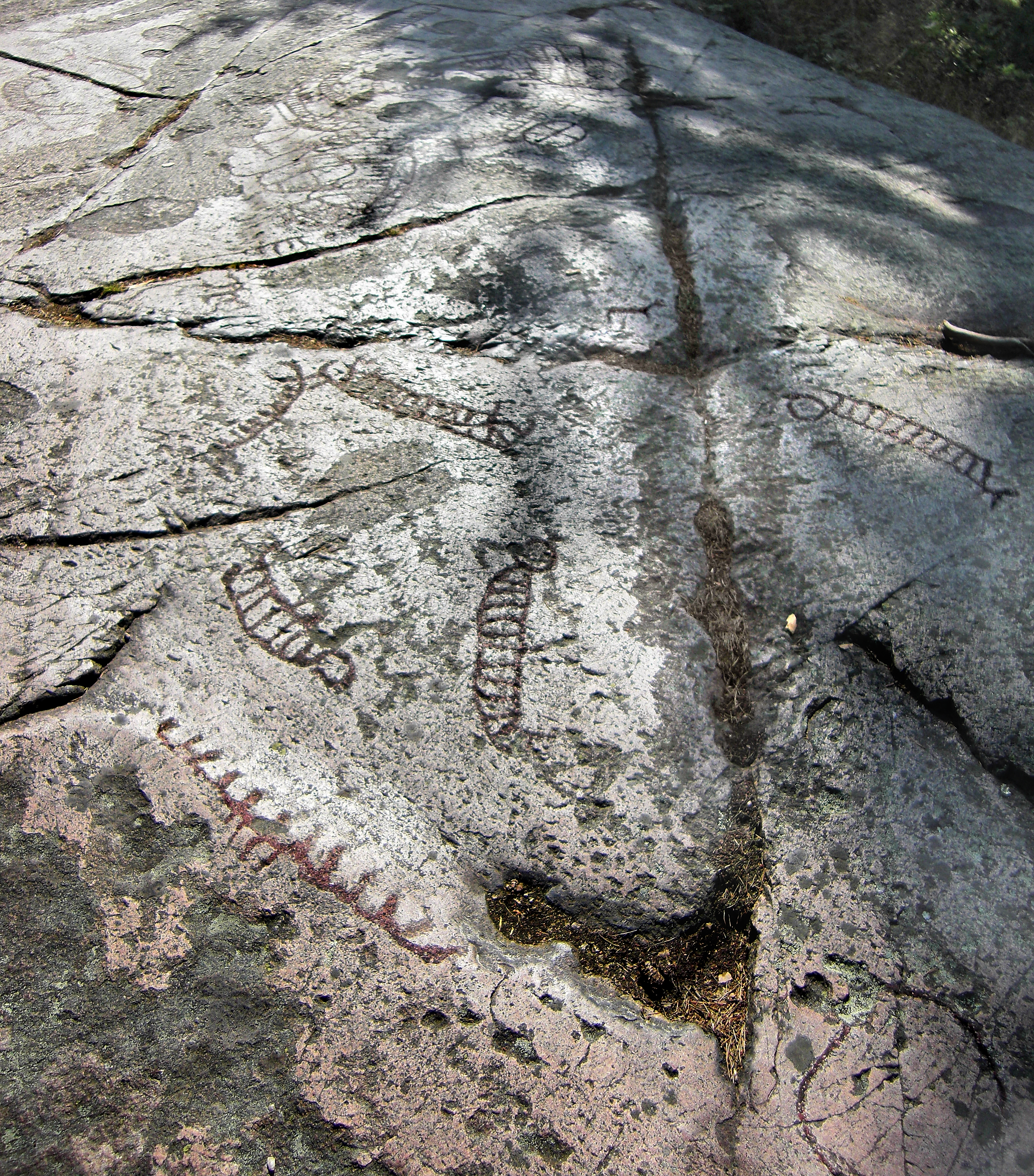

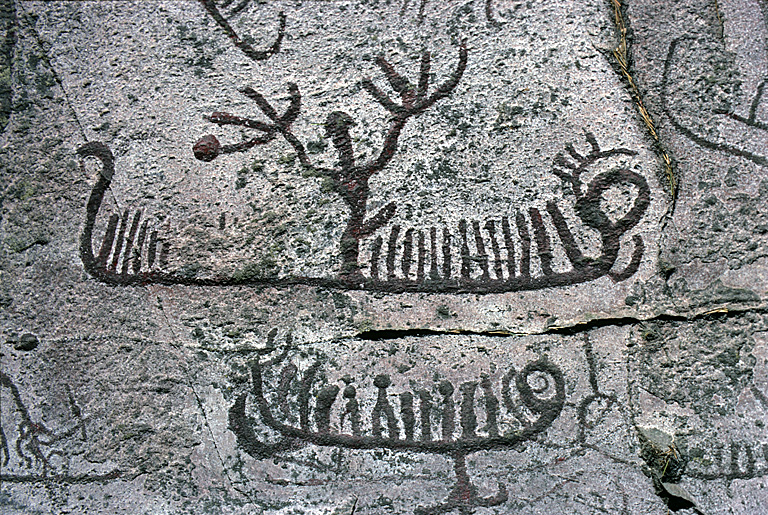
