= Eringsboda =

- Location within Blekinge Location within Sweden
- Coordinates: 56°26′N 15°21′E
- Country: Sweden
- Province: Blekinge
- County: Blekinge County
- Municipality: Ronneby Municipality

Area
  - Total: 0.65 km^{2} (0.25 sq mi)

Population (31 December 2010)
  - Total: 299
  - Density: 459/km^{2} (1,190/sq mi)
- Time zone: UTC+1 (CET)
  - Summer (DST): UTC+2 (CEST)

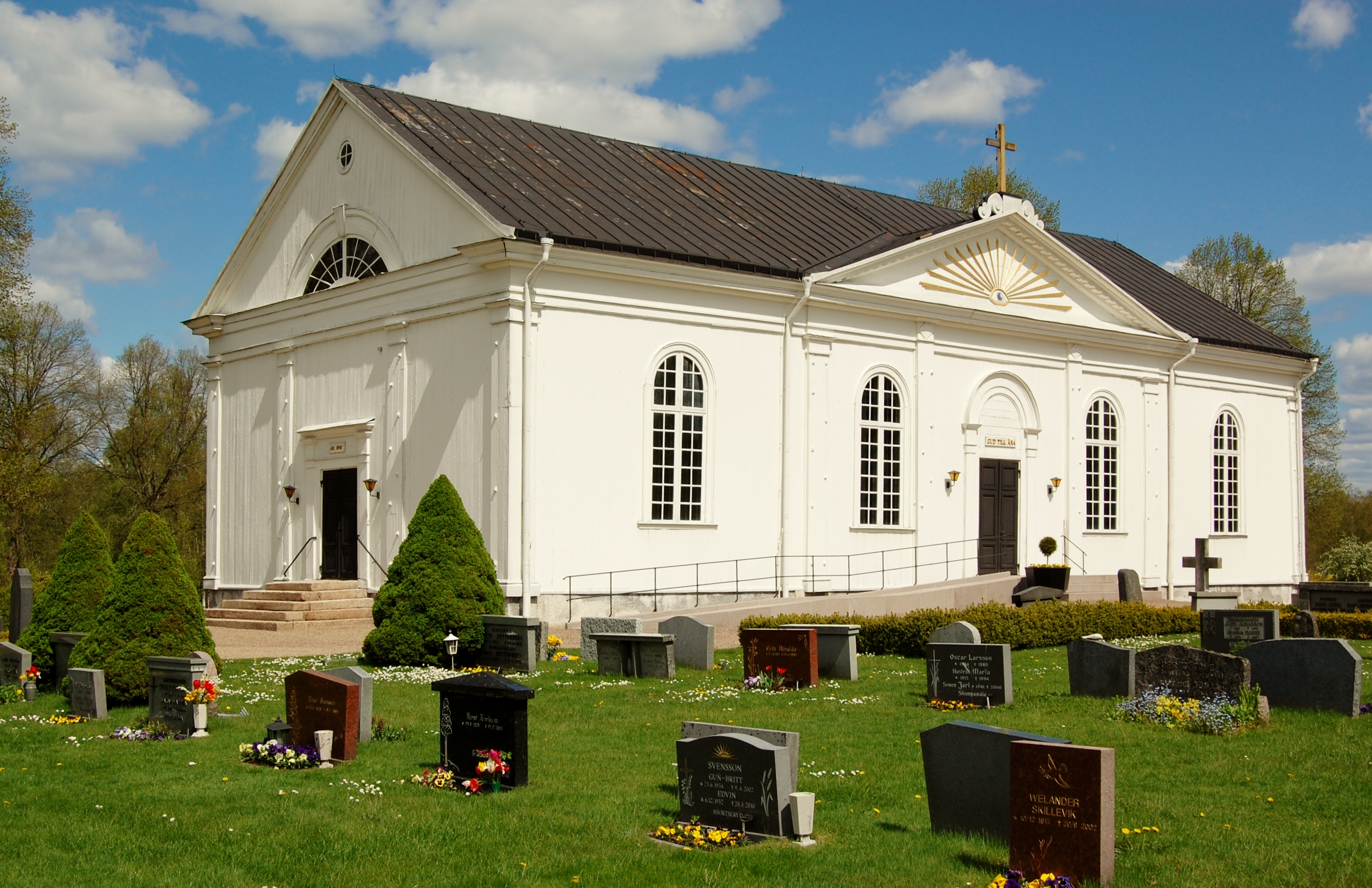
Church

Eringsboda (Swedish pronunciation: [ˈêːrɪŋsˌbuːda]) is a locality situated in Ronneby Municipality, Blekinge County, Sweden with 299 inhabitants in 2010. On 21 December 1910, a railway was opened between Eringsboda and Älmeboda. This railway was in practice an extension of the preexisting one from Nättraby to Eringsboda, and as such the former's owner merged into that of the Nättraby–Eringsboda railway the following year.
