= 2002 Damallsvenskan =

The 2002 Damallsvenskan was the 15th season of the Damallsvenskan. Matches were played between 20 April and 26 October 2002. This was the first season only two teams had been relegated since the 1994 Damallsvenskan. Umeå scored over 100 goals, with 104 in total. This was the first time this had been done in the league. They achieved it again in the 2004 Damallsvenskan, but only finished second.

Umeå IK won the league by three points from Malmö FF. Kopparbergs/Landvetter IF finished third. Before the season, IF Trion, Alviks IK and BK Kenty were promoted. The last two teams were relegated at the end of the season. This was also the last season before Djurgårdens IF and Älvsjö merged.

Pos	Team	Pld	W	D	L	GF	GA	GD	Pts	Qualification or relegation
1	Umeå IK (C, M)	22	20	1	1	104	15	+89	61	Champion
2	Malmö FF	22	18	4	0	81	9	+72	58	
3	Kopparbergs/Landvetter IF	22	10	7	5	28	24	+4	37	
4	Älvsjö AIK	22	10	6	6	60	32	+28	36	
5	Djurgårdens IF	22	10	5	7	41	31	+10	35	
6	Hammarby	22	8	4	10	45	51	−6	28	
7	Bälinge IF	22	7	7	8	21	39	−18	28	
8	IF Trion (N)	22	5	5	12	18	42	−24	20	
9	Mallbackens IF	22	5	5	12	21	47	−26	20	
10	Sunnanå SK	22	4	6	12	26	54	−28	18	
11	Alviks IK (N)	22	4	3	15	21	65	−44	15	Relegated
12	BK Kenty (N)	22	4	1	17	16	73	−57	13	Relegated

(C) Champions; (M) Defending Champion; (N) Newly promoted
