= Sturkö Parish =

Parish of the Church of Sweden

The islands of Sturkö and Tjurkö (56°07′N 15°37′E) form the Sturkö Parish of the Eastern Hundred, Karlskrona Municipality, Blekinge, Sweden.
