= Sturkö =

- Location within Blekinge Location within Sweden
- Coordinates: 56°06′N 15°40′E
- Country: Sweden
- Province: Blekinge
- County: Blekinge County
- Municipality: Karlskrona Municipality

Area
  - Total: 5.78 km^{2} (2.23 sq mi)

Population (31 December 2010)
  - Total: 1,264
  - Density: 219/km^{2} (570/sq mi)
- Time zone: UTC+1 (CET)
  - Summer (DST): UTC+2 (CEST)

Sturkö is a locality located on the island Sturkö in Karlskrona Municipality, Blekinge County, Sweden with 1,264 inhabitants in 2010.

== Sports ==
The following sports clubs are located in Sturkö:

- AIK Atlas
