= Karlskrona Municipality =

Karlskrona Municipality Karlskrona kommun
- Municipality
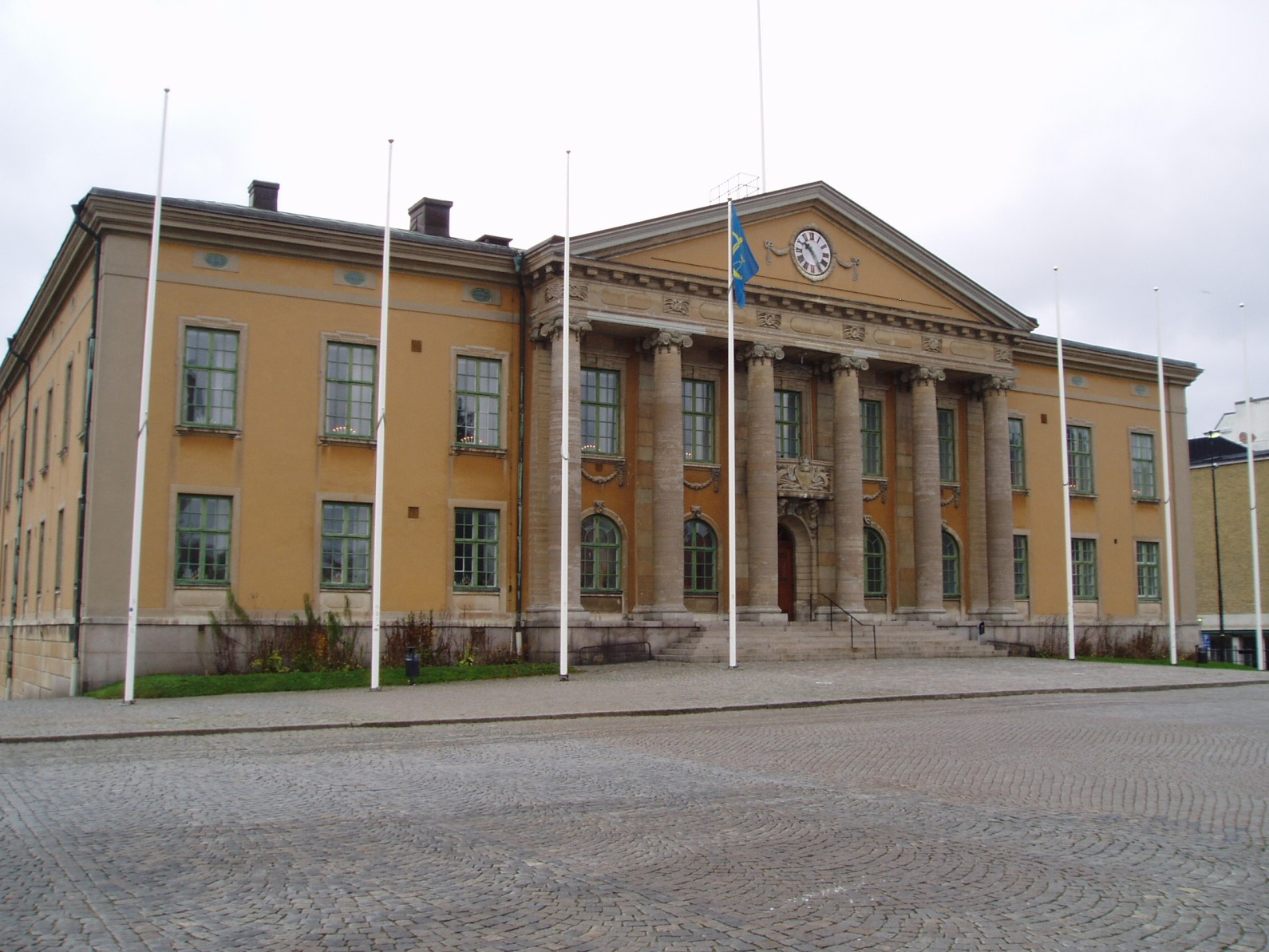
- Karlskrona Town Hall

- Flag Coat of arms

- Coordinates: 56°11′N 15°39′E
- Country: Sweden
- County: Blekinge County
- Seat: Karlskrona

Area
  - Total: 3,338.05 km^{2} (1,288.83 sq mi)
  - Land: 1,042.21 km^{2} (402.40 sq mi)
  - Water: 2,295.84 km^{2} (886.43 sq mi)
- Area as of 1 January 2014.

Population (30 June 2025)
  - Total: 66,168
  - Density: 63.488/km^{2} (164.43/sq mi)
- Time zone: UTC+1 (CET)
  - Summer (DST): UTC+2 (CEST)
- ISO 3166 code: SE
- Province: Blekinge
- Municipal code: 1080
- Website: www.karlskrona.se

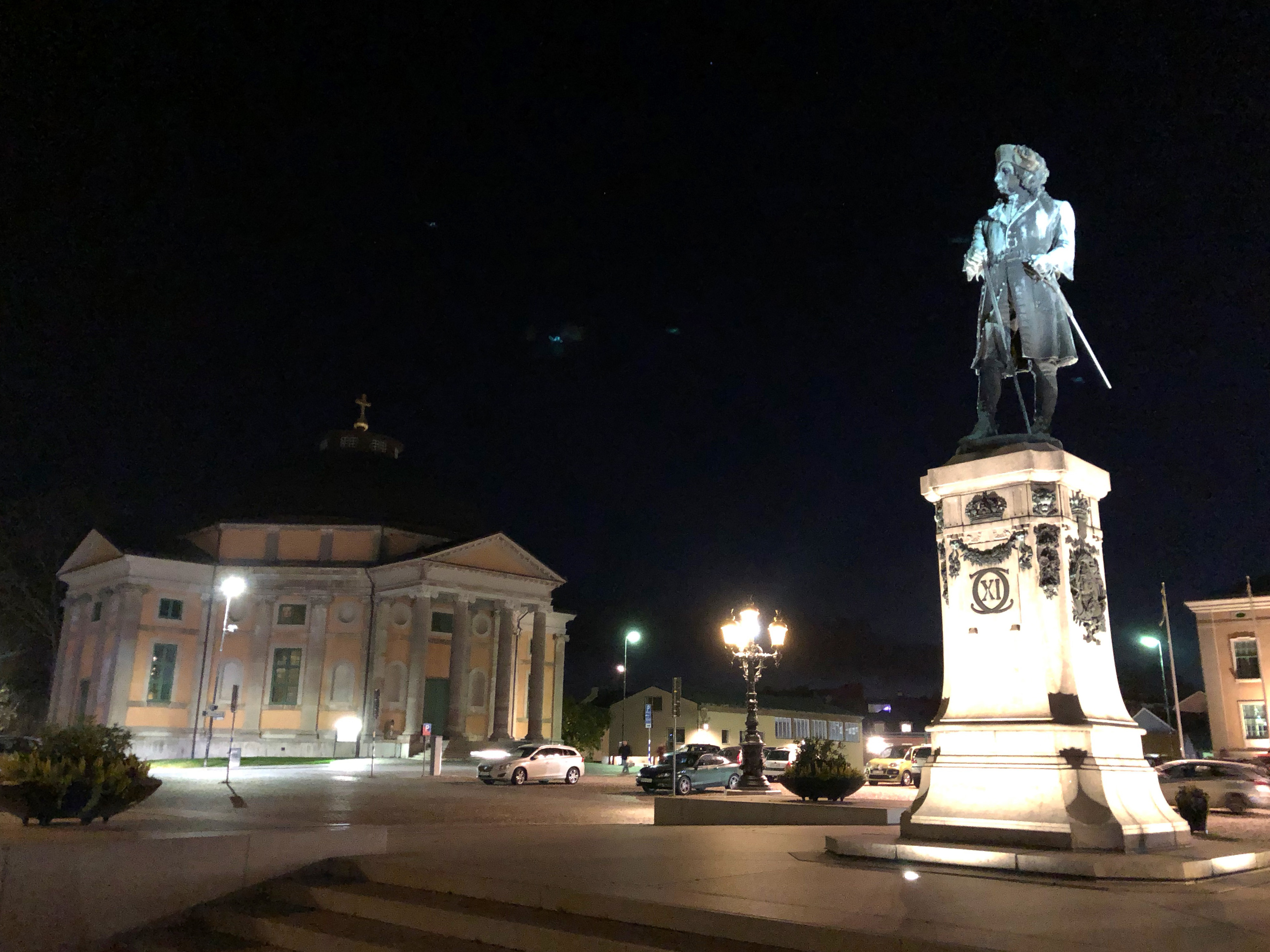
Karl XI monument

Karlskrona Municipality (Swedish: Karlskrona kommun) is a municipality in Blekinge County in South Sweden in southern Sweden. It borders to Emmaboda Municipality, Torsås Municipality and Ronneby Municipality. The city of Karlskrona is the seat of the municipality.

Like most Swedish municipalities it was created during the municipal reform in the early seventies, combining several earlier local government units of urban and rural type, among them the City of Karlskrona.

== Localities ==
There are 18 urban areas (also called a Tätort or locality) in Karlskrona Municipality.

In the table the localities are listed according to the size of the population as of December 31, 2005. The municipal seat is in bold characters.

#	Locality	Population
1	**Karlskrona**	32,606
2	Rödeby	3,356
3	Nättraby	3,053
4	Jämjö	2,596
5	Hasslö	1,643
6	Sturkö	1,293
7	Fridlevstad	697
8	Tving	477
9	Torhamn	473
10	Spjutsbygd	422
11	Fågelmara	398
12	Skavkulla och Skillingenäs	380
13	Holmsjö	347
14	Drottningskär	328
15	Gängletorp	276
16	Kättilsmåla	238
17	Nävragöl	229
18	Brömsebro	213

== Demographics ==
This is a demographic table based on Karlskrona Municipality's electoral districts in the 2022 Swedish general election sourced from SVT's election platform, in turn taken from SCB official statistics.

In total there were 66,647 residents, including 50,805 Swedish citizens of voting age. 45.2 % voted for the left coalition and 53.5 % for the right coalition. Indicators are in percentage points except population totals and income.

Location	Residents	Citizen adults	Left vote	Right vote	Employed	Swedish parents	Foreign heritage	Income SEK	Degree
Location			%	%					
Aspö	552	507	50.0	48.8	75	92	8	24,315	53
Bergåsa	1,470	1,061	47.8	50.1	71	77	23	27,261	71
Fridlevstad	1,450	1,131	34.9	63.6	85	94	6	25,582	32
Galgamarken	1,722	1,099	52.4	43.2	55	53	47	14,928	56
Hasslö	1,713	1,374	49.2	50.3	88	96	4	26,147	46
Hogland	1,382	1,120	44.1	53.6	77	77	23	24,124	47
Hässlegården	2,045	1,386	48.3	51.4	91	89	11	33,389	69
Hästö	1,461	1,106	45.8	53.9	88	93	7	35,004	75
Jämjö N	2,016	1,542	42.6	56.1	86	95	5	24,772	32
Jämjö S	1,550	1,219	46.4	52.8	87	95	5	24,490	40
Kristianopel	1,473	1,197	35.9	63.3	85	92	8	24,075	30
Kronotorp	1,589	1,089	53.0	45.7	74	70	30	23,495	41
Kungsmarken	2,552	1,183	78.9	17.2	46	15	85	11,101	35
Kättismåla	1,474	1,158	38.8	60.2	86	96	4	26,645	37
Lyckeby V	1,669	1,347	52.4	46.1	77	84	16	21,480	44
Lyckeby Ö	1,903	1,418	47.6	50.9	90	91	9	30,545	54
Långö-Gräsvik	1,607	1,238	45.2	52.4	57	79	21	20,252	69
Marieberg	2,139	1,299	57.8	39.8	53	44	56	14,614	42
Mariedal	1,945	1,497	53.0	45.8	82	75	25	25,641	46
Möllebacken	1,923	1,649	44.1	55.1	79	84	16	25,558	55
Nättraby S	2,195	1,529	39.8	59.5	92	96	4	33,151	64
Nättraby V	1,486	1,112	49.2	49.9	84	92	8	27,676	49
Nättraby Ö	1,741	1,287	44.1	55.2	89	94	6	32,227	60
Pantarholmen	2,051	1,708	50.9	47.7	71	76	24	21,358	57
Ramdala	1,413	1,105	42.1	57.1	88	95	5	27,304	44
Rosenfeldt	1,728	1,502	45.4	53.0	80	86	14	26,464	56
Rödeby N	2,139	1,615	41.9	57.0	85	91	9	26,365	42
Rödeby S	1,799	1,337	46.1	52.6	88	92	8	28,025	43
Saltö-Björkholmen	1,836	1,570	46.1	52.8	78	89	11	27,595	61
Sillhövda	1,358	1,076	33.2	65.6	77	89	11	22,120	27
Spandelstorp	2,199	1,589	44.1	54.9	81	85	15	27,406	49
Strömsberg	1,293	1,002	38.1	61.4	82	94	6	24,497	30
Sturkö	1,636	1,371	44.9	53.8	85	96	4	25,815	42
Torhamn	1,477	1,220	40.2	59.4	82	94	6	24,092	38
Trossö Ö	1,327	1,170	44.5	54.8	79	88	12	25,915	57
Trummenäs	1,229	933	37.3	61.9	90	97	3	32,470	59
Tving	1,241	1,008	34.6	64.4	86	93	7	24,375	31
Verkö	1,590	1,165	40.0	59.3	85	85	15	32,653	69
Västerudd	1,650	1,490	45.7	53.1	79	88	12	23,952	49
Wachtmeister	1,624	1,396	45.5	53.0	78	84	16	24,598	50
Source: SVT

== Parishes ==
Parishes ordered by city and hundreds:

1. Karlskrona
  - Karlskrona City Parish
  - Royal Karlskrona Admiralty Parish
2. Eastern Hundred
  - Augerum Parish
  - Flymen Parish
  - Jämjö Parish
  - Kristianopel Parish
  - Lösen Parish
  - Ramdala Parish
  - Rödeby Parish
  - Sturkö Parish
  - Torhamn Parish
  - Virserum Parish
3. Medelstad Hundred
  - Aspö Parish
  - Fridlevstad Parish
  - Hasslö Parish
  - Nättraby Parish
  - Sillhövda Parish
  - Tving Parish
  - Hästö

== Twin towns and sister cities ==
Karlskrona is twinned with:

- Ólafsfjörður, Iceland
- Aizpute, Latvia
- Gdynia, Poland
- Hillerød, Denmark
- Horten, Norway
- Klaipėda, Lithuania
- Loviisa, Finland
- Rostock, Germany

== Villages ==
- Alnaryd
- Alstugorna
- Björkeryd
- Björkhaga
- Färmanstorp
- Gredeby
- Grönadal
- Hagbo
- Hallarum
- Höryda
- Knösö
- Lösen
- Lyckeåborg
- Mältan
- Måstad
- Mjövik
- Möcklö
- Öljersjö
- Saleboda
- Sälleryd
- Sandhamn
- Sjötorp
- Stengöl
- Svensgöl
- Torsnäs

== See also ==
- Blekinge Institute of Technology
- Swedish Coast Guard
- Swedish National Maritime Museums
