= Blekinge County =

County (län) of Sweden

Blekinge County Blekinge län (Swedish)
- County of Sweden
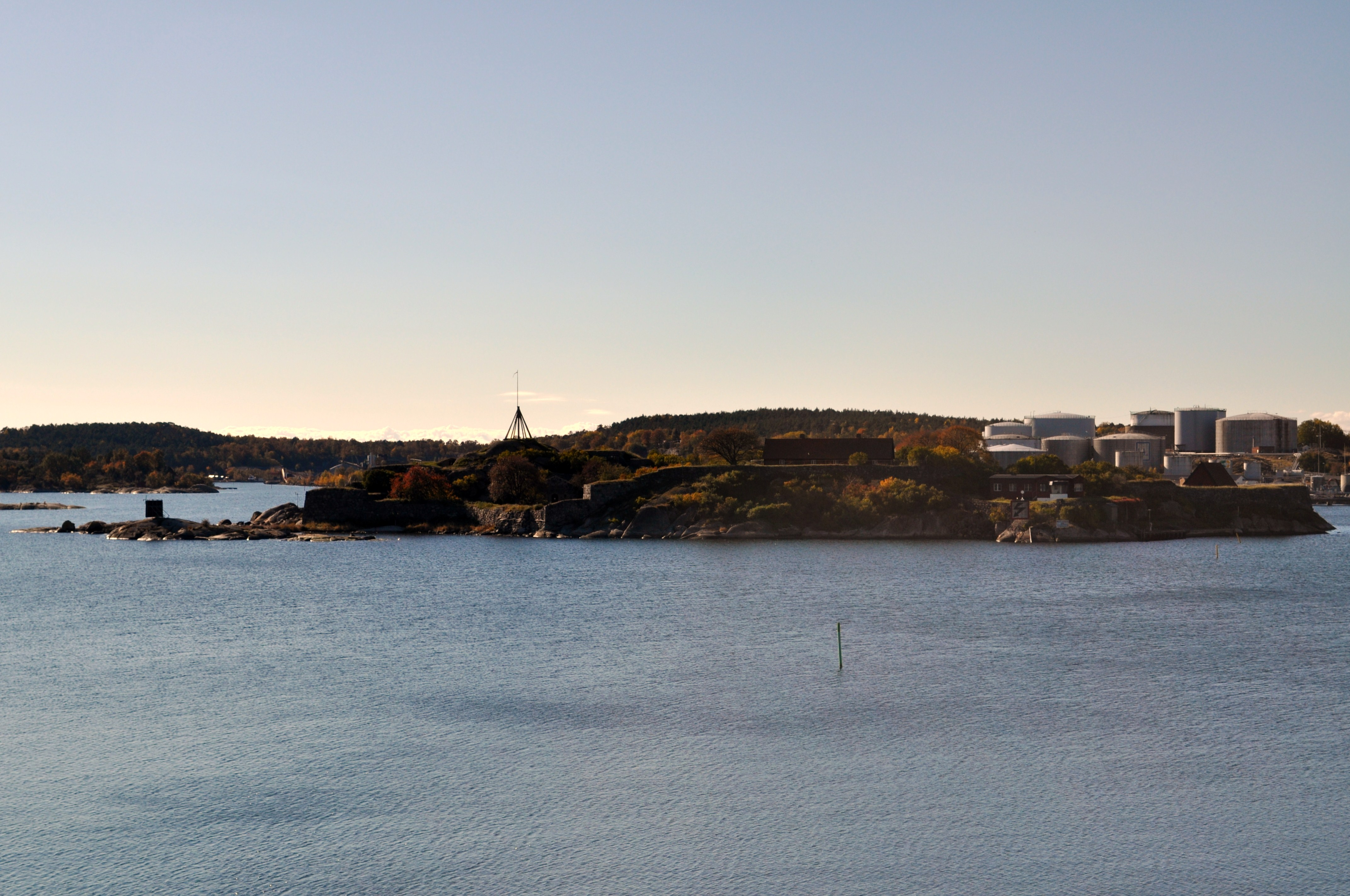
- Karlshamn citadel

- Flag Coat of arms

- Blekinge County in Sweden

- Location map of Blekinge County in Sweden
- Coordinates: 56°14′36″N 14°22′52″E
- Country: Sweden
- Founded: 1683
- Capital: Karlskrona
- Municipalities: 5: Karlshamn; Karlskrona; Olofström; Ronneby; Sölvesborg

Government
  - Governor: Ulrica Messing (Social Democrats)
  - Council: Region Blekinge

Area
  - Total: 3,039.4 km^{2} (1,173.5 sq mi)

Population (30 June 2025)
  - Total: 156,971
  - Density: 51.645/km^{2} (133.76/sq mi)

GDP
  - Total: SEK 53 billion €5.649 billion (2015)
- Time zone: UTC+1 (CET)
  - Summer (DST): UTC+2 (CEST)
- ISO 3166 code: SE-K
- NUTS Region: SE221
- Website: www.k.lst.se

Blekinge County (Swedish: Blekinge län, pronounced [ˈbleːkɪŋɛ lɛːn]) is a county or län in the south of Sweden. It borders the Counties of Skåne, Kronoberg, Kalmar and the Baltic Sea. The capital is Karlskrona. It is the smallest of the present administrative counties of Sweden, covering only 0.7% of the total area of the country. Princess Adrienne, the daughter of Princess Madeleine, is Duchess of Blekinge.

== Province ==
Blekinge, the historical province Blekinge, has virtually the same boundaries as the current administrative entity, Blekinge County.

== Administration ==
Blekinge County was a part of Kalmar County between 1680 and 1683, due to the foundation of the naval base at Karlskrona.

The main aim of the County Administrative Board is to fulfil the goals set in national politics by the Riksdag and the Government, to coordinate the interests and promote the development of the county, to establish regional goals and safeguard the due process of law in the handling of each case. The County Administrative Board is a Government Agency headed by a Governor. See List of Blekinge Governors.

== Heraldry ==
The County of Blekinge inherited its coat of arms from the province of Blekinge. When it is shown with a royal crown it represents the County Administrative Board.

== Politics ==
Blekinge county council, or Region Blekinge, is a municipal entity that is independent of, but coterminous with, the County Administrative Board. Its main responsibilities for the county lie in the areas of health care and public transport.

== Riksdag elections ==
The table details all Riksdag election results of Blekinge County since the unicameral era began in 1970. The blocs denote which party would support the Prime Minister or the lead opposition party towards the end of the elected parliament.

Year	%	Votes	V	S	MP	C	L	KD	M	SD	NyD
1970	85.4	95,576	4.2	50.2		18.7	15.2	1.6	9.9		
1973	90.8	98,425	4.1	49.6		22.9	9.4	1.8	12.0		
1976	92.0	103,248	3.3	49.5		22.0	10.5	1.5	12.6		
1979	91.2	103,037	3.9	49.9		16.5	11.3	1.4	16.6		
1982	91.5	103,262	4.0	52.7	1.2	15.6	5.6	1.9	18.8		
1985	89.9	102,751	4.4	51.6	1.3	12.4	12.4		17.6		
1988	86.0	98,424	4.8	52.2	5.3	11.3	9.6	2.8	13.8		
1991	87.5	99,208	4.1	46.0	2.8	9.0	7.5	6.2	18.1		4.6
1994	87.6	100,235	6.5	52.9	4.4	7.6	5.2	3.3	18.5		1.1
1998	82.3	93,756	13.1	42.4	3.9	5.3	3.6	11.0	19.2		
2002	82.3	94,558	8.3	45.7	3.8	6.1	11.1	8.8	13.2	2.8	
2006	83.1	95,781	5.4	42.1	3.7	7.2	6.4	5.2	22.0	6.2	
2010	85.8	100,162	5.1	36.5	5.3	5.8	5.4	4.0	27.3	9.8	
2014	86.8	102,225	4.7	37.2	4.9	5.7	3.9	3.4	19.4	18.5	
2018	88.5	104,514	5.5	31.4	2.9	6.8	4.0	5.7	17.3	25.2	
2022	86.1	104,846	4.4	31.1	2.9	4.8	3.5	5.5	17.9	28.5	

== Governors ==
The current governor of Blekinge County is Swedish Social Democratic Party politician Ulrica Messing, appointed on the 1st of October 2021.

== Municipalities ==
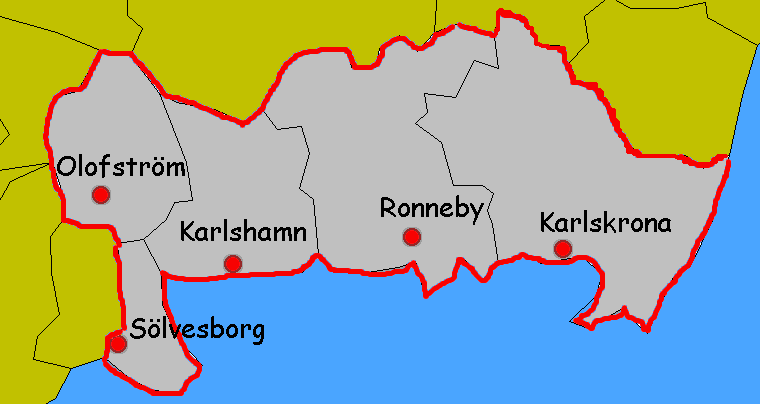

Population as of 2009-12-31 Blekinge county total 152 591, 1.6% of the nation.

- Karlshamn 30 919
- Karlskrona 63 342
- Olofström 13 102
- Ronneby 28 416
- Sölvesborg 16 813

== Localities in order of size ==
The five most populous localities of Blekinge County in 2020:

#	Locality	Population
1	Karlskrona	36,904
2	Karlshamn	20,228
3	Ronneby	12,803
4	Sölvesborg	8,832
5	Olofström	7,777

== Villages ==
- Bräkne-hoby
- Olsäng

== Demographics ==
=== Foreign background ===
SCB have collected statistics on backgrounds of residents since 2002. These tables consist of all who have two foreign-born parents or are born abroad themselves. The chart lists election years and the last year on record alone.

Location	2002	2006	2010	2014	2018	2019
Karlshamn	7.6	9.2	10.9	13.6	17.1	17.8
Karlskrona	7.1	9.0	12.5	13.3	16.2	16.5
Olofström	21.9	22.3	23.4	26.6	31.2	31.4
Ronneby	8.4	10.1	12.6	14.8	21.4	21.9
Sölvesborg	9.3	10.5	11.9	13.2	15.3	15.2
Total	9.0	10.6	13.0	14.8	18.5	18.9
Source: SCB
