= List of manor houses =

A manor house was historically the main residence of the lord of the manor in Europe. The house formed the administrative centre of a manor in the European feudal system; within its great hall were held the lord's manorial courts, communal meals with manorial tenants and great banquets. The term is today loosely applied to various country houses, frequently dating from the late medieval era, which formerly housed the gentry.

This is an incomplete list.

== Denmark ==
Rosenholm Castle in Denmark

- Berritzgaard Manor
- Børglum Abbey
- Clausholm Castle
- Dragsholm Castle
- Egeskov Castle
- Fuglsang Manor
- Gavnø Castle
- Glorup Manor
- Krogerup Manor
- Nysø Manor
- Rosenholm Castle
- Skjoldenæsholm Castle
- Svanholm Manor
- Vemmetofte Convent
- Gammel Estrup

== Estonia ==
See: List of palaces and manor houses in Estonia

== Finland ==
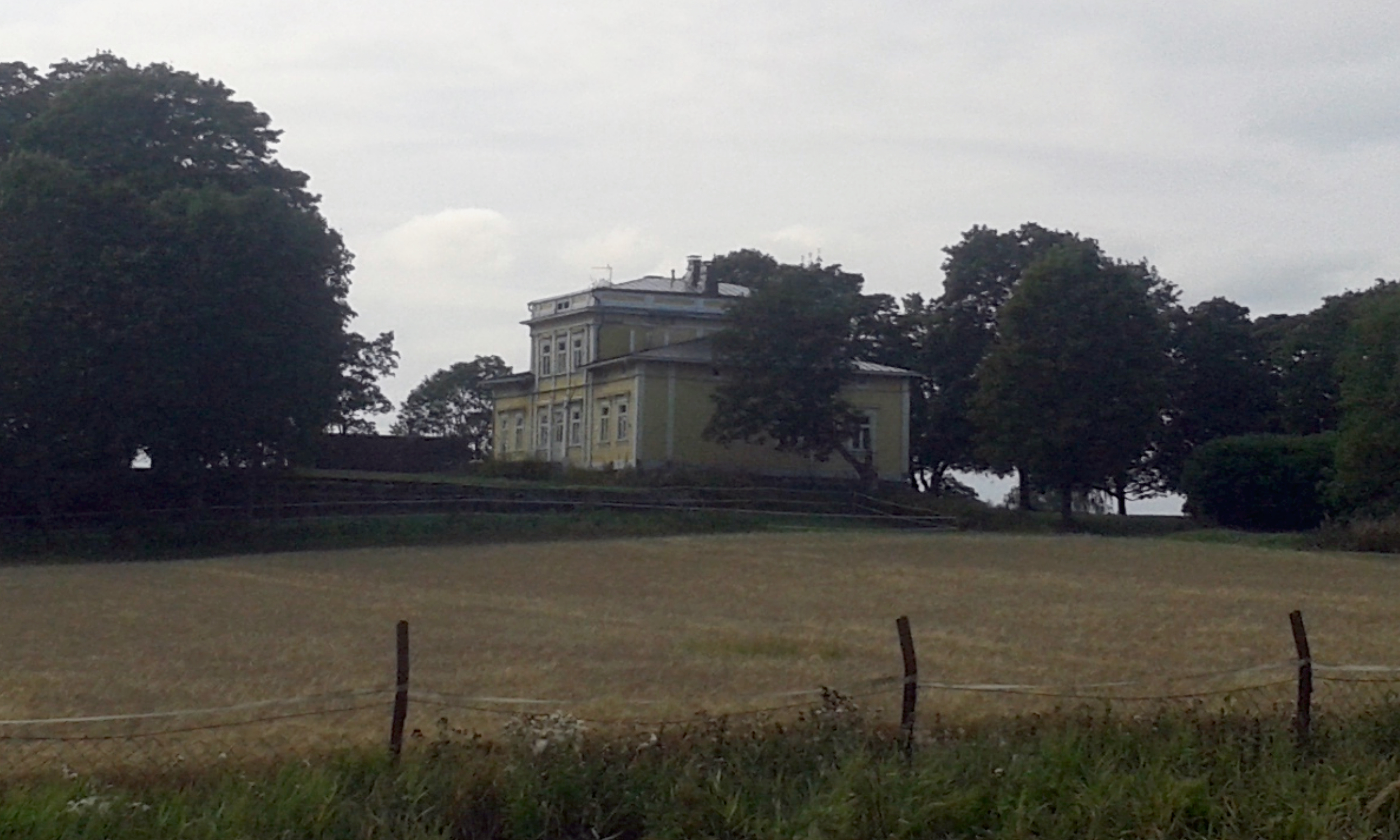
Numlahti Manor

- Alberga
- Esbogård
- Kankas
- Kymmenegård, Kyminkartano
- Malmgård
- Numlax
- Qvidja
- Sjundby
- Sarvlax
- Stensböle
- Svidja
- Träskända
- Vuojoki
- Villnäs

== France ==
- Château d'Harcourt in Eure, Normandy.
- Château de Beaumont-le-Richard in Calvados, Normandy. (Fr)
- Château de Bienassis in Côtes-d'Armor, Brittany. (Fr)
- Château de Bonnefontaine in Ille-et-Vilaine, Brittany. (Fr)
- Château de Gratot in Manche, Normandy.
- Château de Hac, 14th century, Côtes-d'Armor, Brittany
- Manoir de Kerazan in Finistère, Brittany. (Fr)
- Château de Kérouzéré in Finistère, Brittany.
- Château des Milandes in Dordogne, Aquitaine.

- Château de Pirou in Manche, Normandy.
- Château du Plessis-Josso in Morbihan, Brittany.
- Château de Puymartin in Dordogne, Aquitaine. (in French)
- Château de la Roche-Jagu in Côtes-d'Armor, Brittany. Strategically important maison-forte in Trégor. (Fr)
- Château des Rochers-Sévigné in Ille-et-Vilaine, Brittany. (Fr)
- Château de Rustéphan in Finistère, Brittany. Ruins of large 15th–16th century manor house.
- Château de Trécesson in Morbihan, Brittany.
- manoir du Clap, 16th-19th century Manor in la Cerlangue, Upper Normandy.
- Manoir de Dur-Écu, 16th century manor in Urville-Nacqueville, Normandy.
- Manoir de Mathan, 16th century manor in Crépon, Normandy.
- Manoir de Mézarnou, 16th century manor in Finistère, Brittany. (under extensive restoration)
- Château de la Motte, Joué du Plain

== Germany ==
See: List of castles, palaces and manor houses in Germany

- Gut Altenhof in Dänischer Wohld
- Schloss Bothmer in Klütz
- Gut Blomenburg in Selent
- Gut Brodau in Ostholstein
- Gut Emkendorf in Emkendorf
- Essenrode Manor in Essenrode
- Schloss Glücksburg on Angeln
- Gut Knoop in Dänischer Wohld
- Gut Krummbek
- Gut Panker in Ostholstein
- Gut Projensdorf in Dänischer Wohld
- Gut Salzau in Fargau-Pratjau
- Gut Wahlstorf in Otterndorf
- Gut Wellingsbüttel
- Gut Wotersen in Herzogtum Lauenburg
- Schloss Ahrensburg in Ahrensburg
- Nütschau Priory in Travenbrück
- Rittergut Kürbitz
- Villa Haas in Hesse

== In the United Kingdom and Crown dependencies ==
=== Channel Islands ===
- Sausmarez Manor in Guernsey
- Samarès Manor in Jersey
- Les Augrès Manor, Jersey
- Longueville Manor, Jersey
- Saint Ouen's Manor, Jersey
- Sark Manor, Sark

=== Isle of Man ===
- Bishopscourt, Michael District
- Injebreck Manor House, Braddan

=== England ===
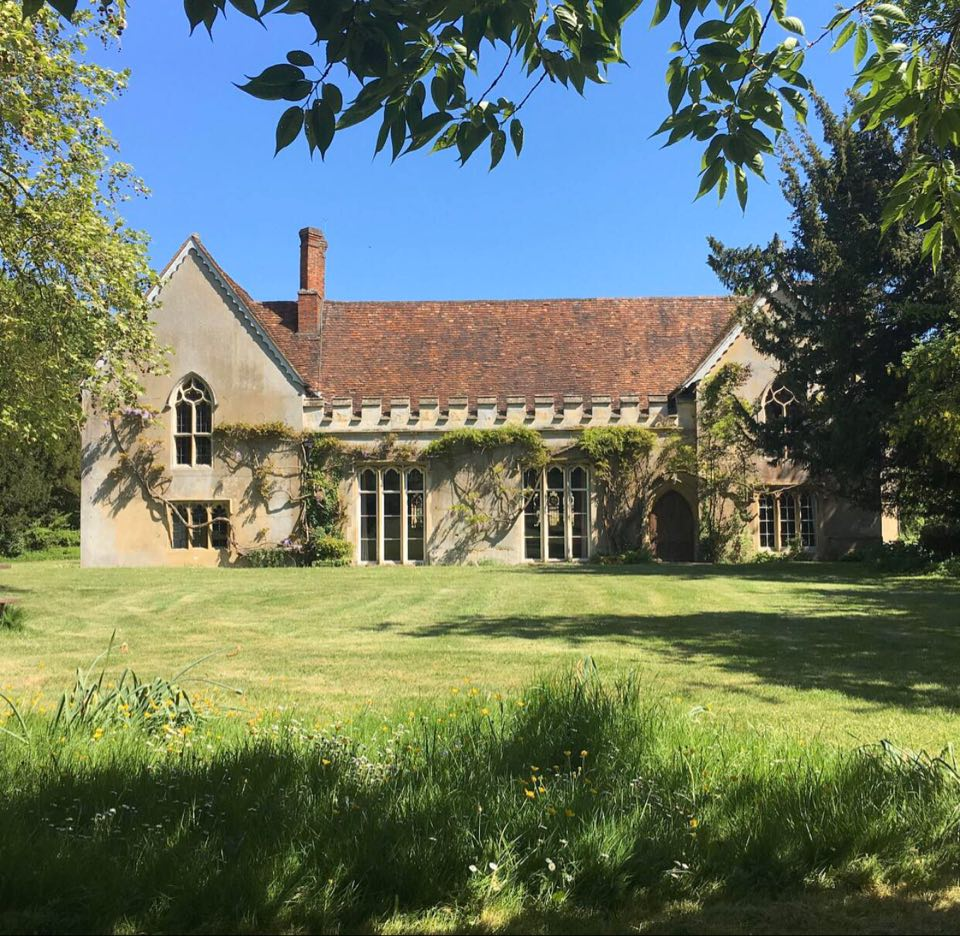
The Abbey, Sutton Courtenay

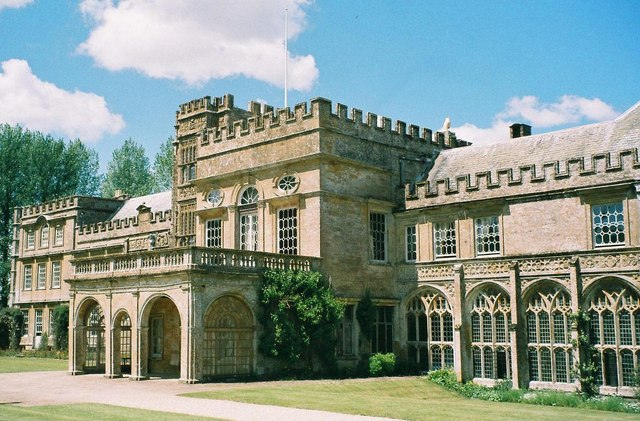
Forde Abbey

- The Abbey, Sutton Courtenay
- Alford Manor House
- Ascott Manor
- Ascott-under-Wychwood Manor
- Ashton Court
- Avebury Manor
- Aydon Castle, Northumberland
- Barrington Court
- Baddesley Clinton
- Bank Hall, Bretherton
- Barkham Manor, Berkshire
- Beachborough Manor
- Begbroke Manor, Oxfordshire
- Bettiscombe Manor
- Birtsmorton Court
- Bitterne Manor
- Bletchingdon Manor
- Boarstall Tower
- Boothby Hall
- Bradninch
- Bramall Hall
- Bromley Palace
- Brooksby Hall
- Brympton d'Evercy
- Bucknell Manor
- Burghley House
- Calcot Manor
- Chambercombe Manor
- Chavenage House
- Cheddington
- Chenies Manor House
- Childwickbury Manor
- Clevedon Court
- Cothay Manor

- Cothelstone Manor
- Cranborne
- Desning Hall
- Duns Tew Manor
- East Riddlesden Hall
- Edlingham Castle
- Etal Manor on the Ford Castle and Etal Castle estate
- Farleigh House
- Finchcocks
- Flamborough Manor
- Gainsborough Old Hall
- Garsington Manor
- Gidea Hall
- Great Bidlake
- Great Chalfield Manor
- Great Snoring/Snoring Magna Manor
- Great Tew Manor
- Greaves Hall
- Grimshaw Hall
- Groby Old Hall
- Garsington Manor
- Halsway Manor
- Halswell House
- Hampton Gay Manor — burnt out
- Harlington Manor
- Harlaxton Manor
- Hartham Park, Corsham
- Hatfield House
- Hinxworth Place
- Hestercombe House
- Hever Castle, Kent
- Hughenden Manor
- Holly Tree House, Benfleet
- Ightham Mote
- Icomb Place

- Kelmscott Manor
- Kemerton Court
- Kirby Muxloe Castle
- Knole House
- Lambton Castle
- Langdon Court
- Leckhampton Court
- Les Augres Manor
- Lesingham House
- Levens Hall
- Linford Manor
- Little Barford
- Little Snoring Manor
- Little Tew Manor
- Lytes Cary
- Montacute House
- Manor House Hotel, Castle Combe
- Manor House, Steeple Langford
- Narborough Hall
- Newton Surmaville
- Northborough, Cambridgeshire
- Nunnington Hall
- Orchardleigh Estate
- Oxon Hoath
- Owlpen Manor
- Petworth House
- Pixton Park
- Portledge Manor
- Poundisford Park
- Rivington Hall
- Roos Hall
- Rufford Old Hall
- Sandhill Park
- Sawston Hall

- Selly Manor
- Scotney Castle
- Shutford Manor
- Simpson's Place
- Snowshill Manor
- Someries Castle
- Somerton Castle
- Speke Hall
- Stanford Hall
- Stockbridge Manor
- Stokesay Castle
- Ston Easton Park
- Stourhead
- Sturminster Newton
- Sulgrave
- Sutton Court
- Theobalds
- Thorndon Hall
- Throckley Hall
- Ufton Court
- Waddesdon Manor
- Walton Hall, Milton Keynes
- Wanborough Manor
- Washington Old Hall (ancestral home of George Washington)
- Weoley Castle
- West Bromwich Manor House
- Whalton Manor
- Wightwick Manor
- Wilderhope Manor on Wenlock Edge
- Wingfield Manor — deserted
- Woodeaton Manor
- Woodstock Manor
- Woolsthorpe Manor
- Yalding Manor
- Yarnton Manor

=== Northern Ireland ===
- Killadeas, 'Manor House Hotel', County Fermanagh
- Richhill Castle, County Armagh

=== Scotland ===
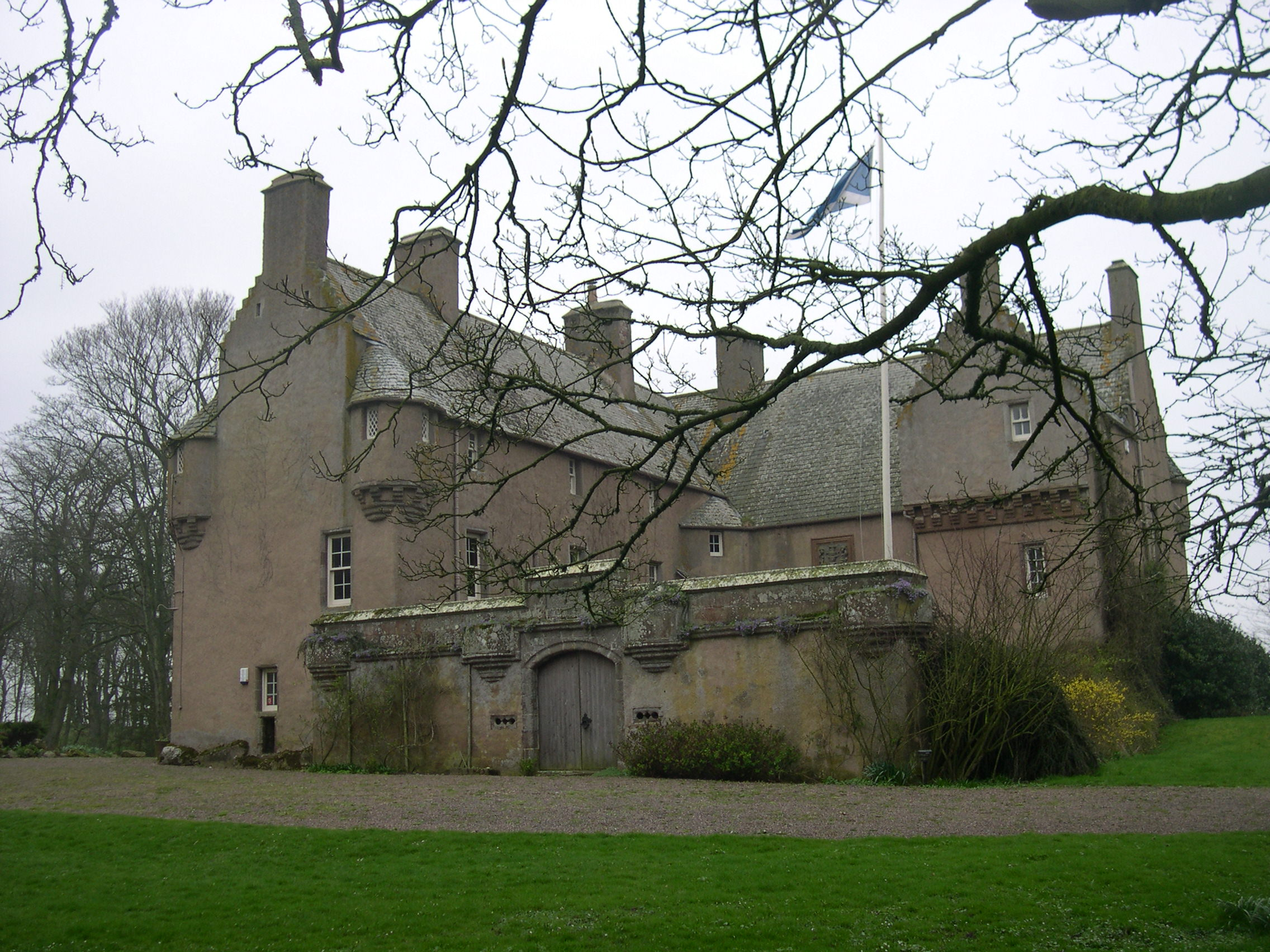
Muchalls Castle, a 17th-century house in Aberdeenshire, Scotland

- Brodie Castle
- Drum Castle, started as a 13th-century tower house.
- Foulis Castle
- Haddo House
- House of Dun
- Inveresk Manor House
- Lingo House
- Monboddo House
- Muchalls Castle

=== Wales ===
- Bodysgallen Hall near Conwy Castle
- Gwydir Castle, Conwy valley, North Wales
- Llancaiach Fawr near Abercynon and Ystrad Mynach
- Tretower Court near Crickhowell
- Weobley Castle, Gower

== Ireland ==
- Dunboy Castle, is located on the Beara Peninsula in south-west Ireland
- Ballylickey Manor House on Bantry Bay
- Temple House, Ballymote, County Sligo
- Mount Juliet Estate Manor House, Country Kilkenny
- Temple House Manor, County Westmeath
- Bunratty House, County Clare

== Latvia ==
See: List of palaces and manor houses in Latvia

== Netherlands ==
- Huis Doorn (Doorn, near Utrecht)
- Slot Heemstede (Heemstede, near Haarlem)
- Beeckestijn (Velsen-Zuid)
- Frankendael (Amsterdam)
- Huys Clingendael (Wassenaar)
- Villa Maarheeze (Wassenaar)
- Landgoed Schaffelaar (Barneveld)

== Norway ==
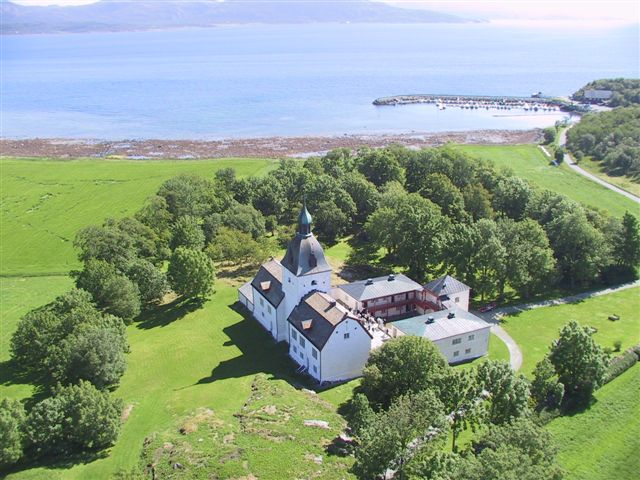
Austråttborgen on the Trondheimsfjord is one of the oldest Norwegian manors

- Austrått Castle
- Fritzøehus Castle
- Damsgård Manor
- Eidsvollsbygningen
- Fossum hovedgård
- Frogner Manor
- Frogner Hovedgård (Skien)
- Linderud gård
- Jarlsberg Manor
- Store Milde Hovedgård

== Poland ==
- Abbot's Palace (Oliwa)
- Bachorza manor
- Branicki Palace, Białystok
- Castle in Pszczyna
- Czerniejewo
- Dzików Castle
- Jabłonna Palace
- Krasiczyn Palace
- Kozłówka Palace
- Krasków, Lower Silesian Voivodeship
- Kurozwęki Palace
- Książ
- Łańcut Castle
- Nieborów
- Owińska Palace
- Pabianice
- Pawłowice
- Pławowice
- Przeworsk
- Przyszowice
- Racot
- Rogalin
- Rydzyna Castle
- Śmiełów
- Świerklaniec
- Sztynort
- Tułowice Palace
- Turew
- Walewice
- Wilanów Palace
- Żelazowa Wola

== Portugal ==
- Solar da Madre de Deus
- Solar de Mateus
- Solar dos Matas
- Quinta da Regaleira
- Solar de Sezim

== Russia ==
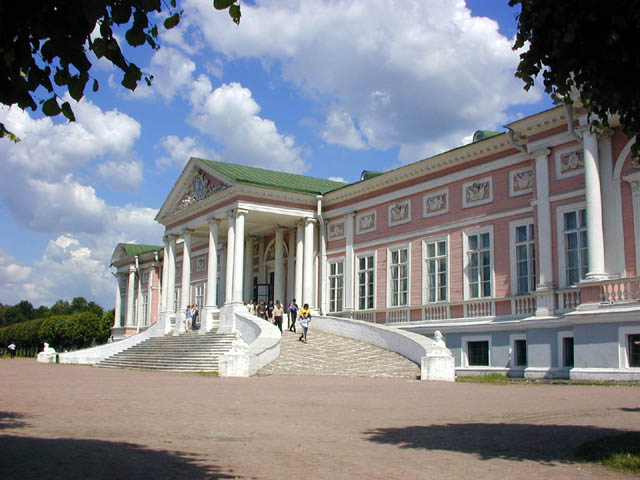
Kuskovo

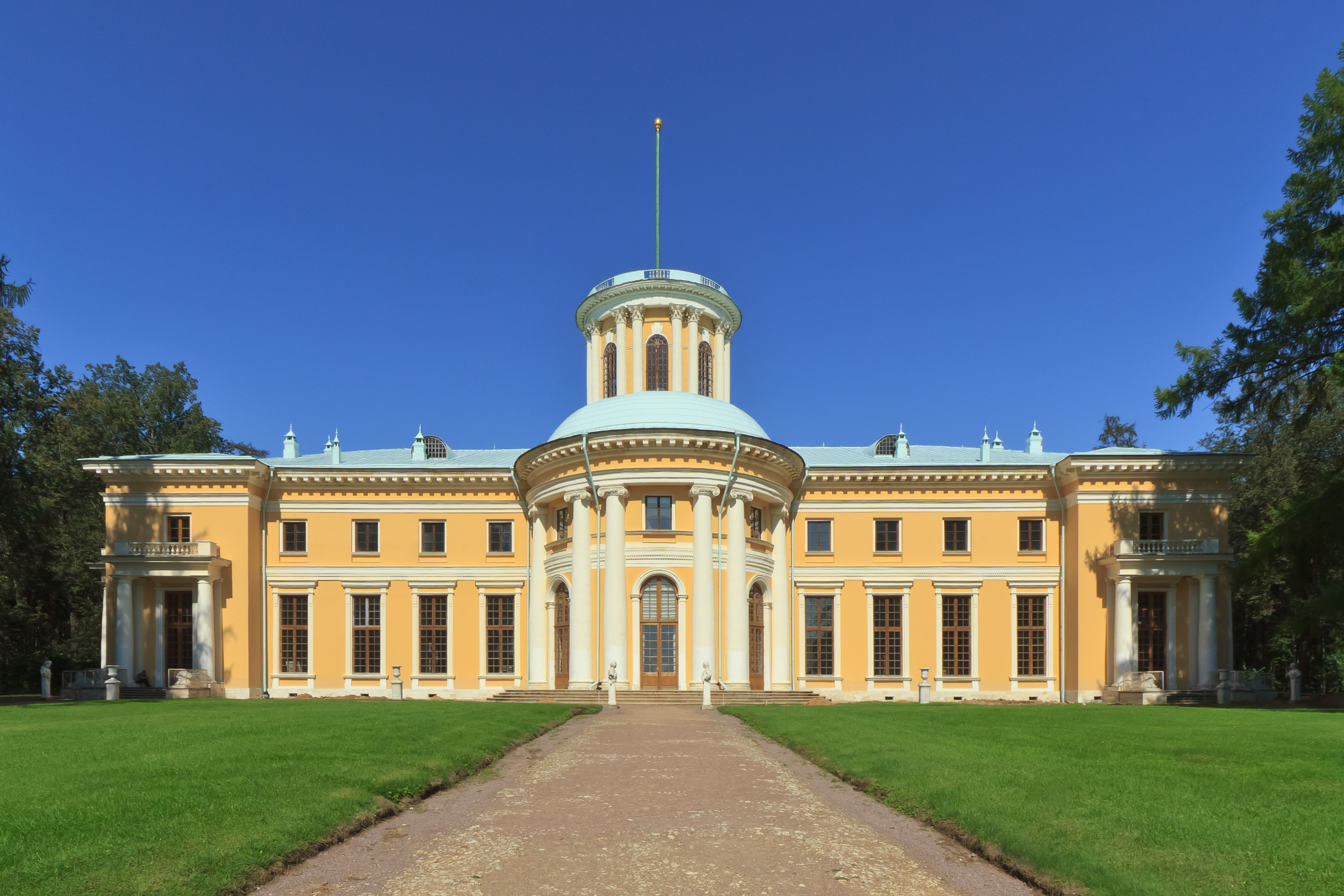
Arkhangelskoye Palace

- Abramtsevo
- Arkhangelskoye
- Grebnevo
- Kuskovo
- Ligovo
- Meyendorf
- Muranovo
- Ostankino
- Priory Palace
- Ropsha
- Rozhdestveno
- Sergiyevka
- Strelna
- Tarkhany
- Yasnaya Polyana
- Yelagin Palace
- Znamenka (residence)

== Spain ==
- Archbishop's Palace of Alcalá de Henares
- Archbishop's Palace, Seville
- Alcázar of Toledo
- Alcázar of Seville
- Alcázar de los Reyes Cristianos
- Alcázar of Segovia
- Cortijo de Miraflores
- Cortijo Jurado
- Liria Palace
- Palace of Zarzuela
- Palace of Moncloa
- Palace of the Borgias
- Pazo de Meirás
- Royal Palace of Madrid
- Royal Palace of El Pardo
- Royal Palace of Aranjuez
- Royal Palace of La Granja de San Ildefonso
- Royal Palace of Riofrío
- Royal Palace of La Almudaina

== Sweden ==
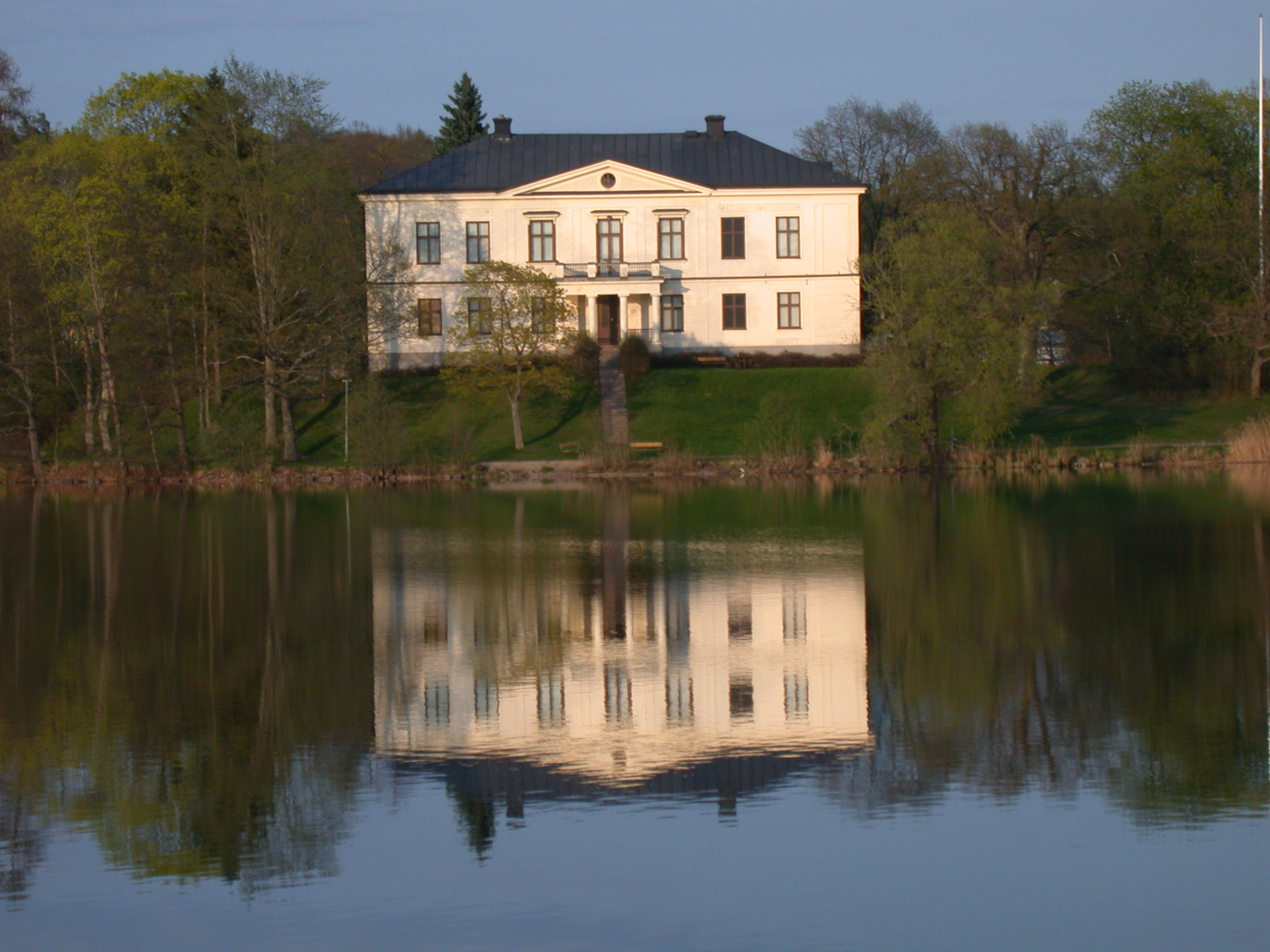
A manor house called Charlottenborg in Motala, Sweden

- Augerum
- Charlottenborg
- Djupadals
- Elleholms
- Göholms
- Halltorp
- Harpsund
- Marielund
- Övralid
- Skärva
- Ström
- Tromtö

== North America ==
=== United States ===
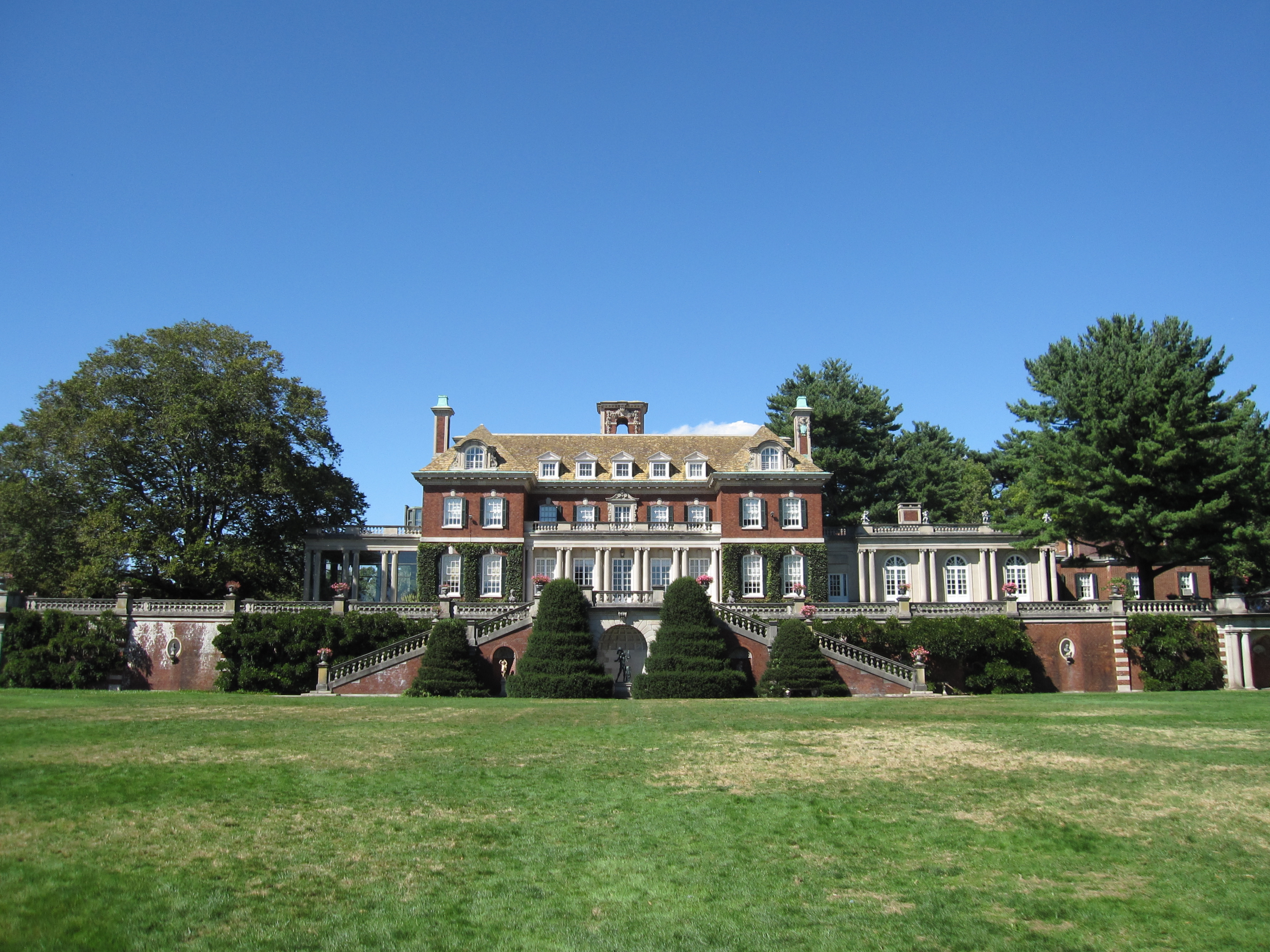
Westbury House at Old Westbury Gardens

- Old Westbury Gardens
- Arlington
- Biltmore Estate
- Berkeley
- Berry Hill
- Bloedel Reserve
- Boone Hall
- Brandon
- Bremo
- Evelynton
- Gunston Hall
- Oheka Castle
- Orton
- Vanderbilt Mansion National Historic Site
- Filoli
- Kykuit
- Monticello
- Mount Vernon
- Skylands
- Nemours Mansion and Gardens
- Coe Hall
- Prestwould
- Pennsbury Manor
- Carter's Grove
- Spelling Manor
- The Breakers
- Hearst Castle
- Rosewell
- Stratford Hall
- Villa Vizcaya
- Winterthur
- Rough Point
- Westover
- Wilton

=== Canada ===
A few manors are found in Canada and most are in Quebec:

- Willistead Manor - Walkerville, Ontario
- Manoir Rouville-Campbell - Mont-Saint-Hilaire, Quebec
- Manoir Taschereau - Sainte-Marie, Quebec
- Manoir Bleury-Bouthillier - Rosemère, Quebec
- Manoir Louis-Joseph-Papineau - Montebello, Québec
- Manoir Mauvide-Genest - Saint-Jean-de-l'Île-d'Orléans, Québec
