= Augerum =

- Village
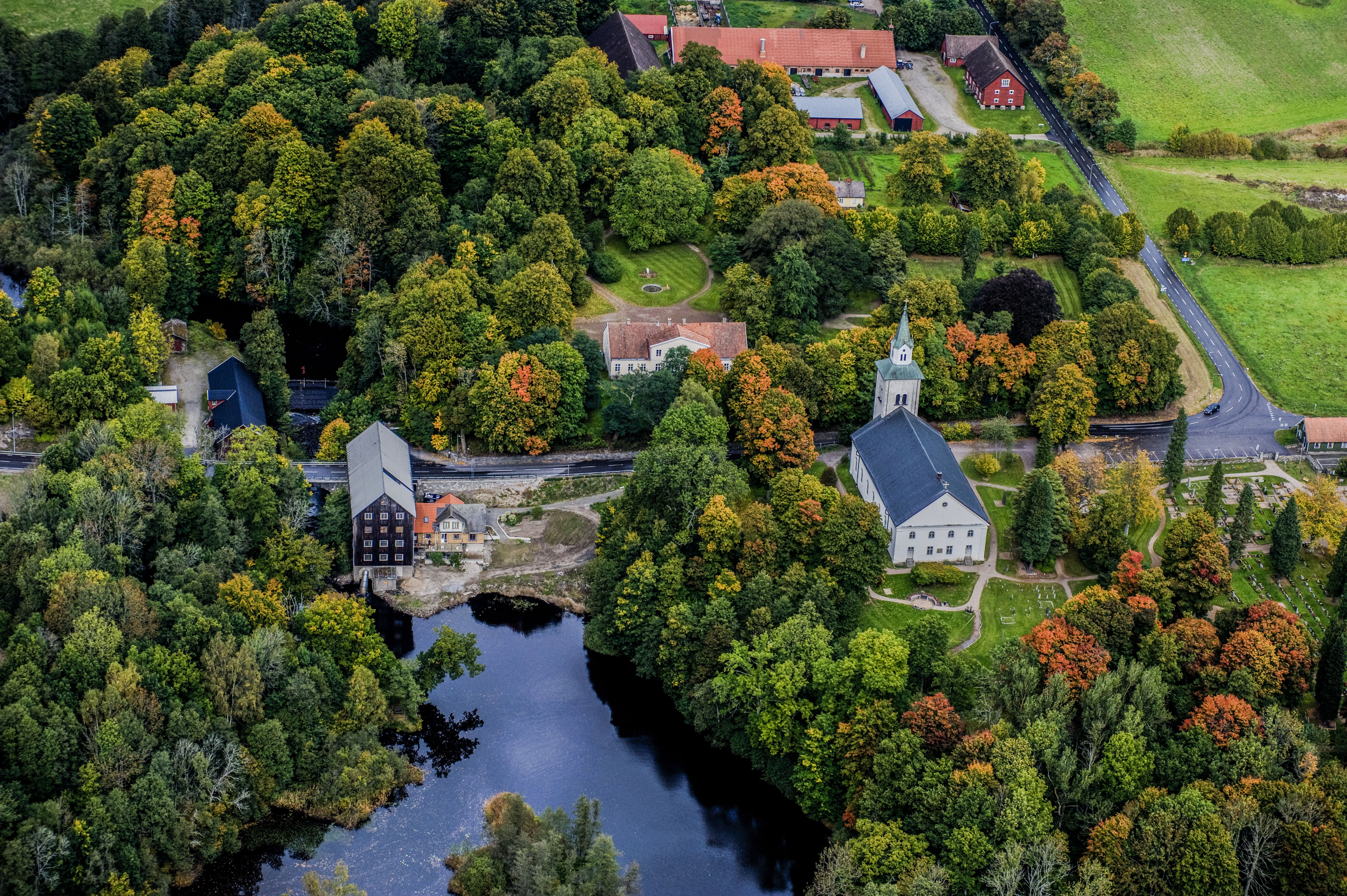
- Aerial view of Augerum

- Location in Blekinge County
- Coordinates: 56°13′3″N 15°40′35″E
- Country: Sweden
- County: Blekinge County
- Municipality: Karlskrona Municipality
- Time zone: UTC+1 (CET)
  - Summer (DST): UTC+2 (CEST)

Augerum is a village in Karlskrona Municipality in Blekinge County, Sweden. It is the site of Augerum Manor (Augerums gård) and Augerum Church (Augerums kyrka) in the Diocese of Lund.

Augerum Church is located next to the Lyckebyån river. The church building, designed by architect Jacob Wilhelm Gerss (1784-1844), was built in the neoclassical style in 1819–1822. In 1862, the exterior was altered by the erection of a tower in the north according to drawings by architect Albert Törnqvist (1819-1898).

Augerum Manor has two main buildings, the older one built about 1720 by pharmacist Johan Eberhard Ferber (1678-1761); the newer one, called Stora Hus, in 1810 by Admiral Providence Master Carl Schweber. In 1855, the property was bought by Chancellor of Justice Nils von Koch (1801-1881) and his spouse Frances F. Lewin (1804-1888). The estate is still owned by members of their family.

Augerum is a substantial find spot for Baltic ware, pottery that spread from Slavic areas in continental Europe to Scandinavia during the Iron Age. The pottery in Blekinge differs in style from that in Slavic areas and other former parts of the kingdom of Denmark however, which indicates a closer connection to the Swedish areas of Småland and Öland.
