= Simpson's Manor =

Coordinates: 51.4011°N 0.0141°E

Simpson's Manor, or Simpson's Place, was a moated medieval manor house in Bromley, Kent, England, with evidence of habitation going back to the reign of Edward I (r. 1272–1307). It was demolished around 1870 but survives in the name of a (minor) local road – Simpsons Road.

== History of the site ==
Simpson's Place, c. 1800.

Historical records show that the site belonged to the "Bankewell" (aka "Banquelle" or "de Banquelle") family as far back as 1302 (during the reign of Edward I) with John de Bankwell holding a charter of free warren to his lands there. His descendant Thomas de Bankewell is recorded as dying as a fief in 1352 (during Edward III's reign). The land eventually passed to the Clark family, and during the reign of Henry V (1413–1422) William Clark applied for a license to build a fortified manor house with crenellated walls and a deep moat (the latter being recorded as "supplied and nourished with a living spring").

John Simpson acquired the manor in the latter part of the reign of Henry VI (r. 1422–1461), made improvements to the site and gave his name to it. His descendant Nicholas Simpson (fl. 1530–1541) was the barber to Henry VIII and featured in the painting "Henry VIII Presenting a Charter to the Barber Surgeons Company" by Hans Holbein the younger. It is thought that he had a "huge and very handsome red-brick chimney" added to the house.

The manor eventually passed from Nicholas Simpson to Alexander Bassett to Sir Humphrey Style of Langley, esquire and Sheriff of Kent, (d. 1557), the estate being then held in a form of tenure called socage. It remained in the Styles family until the death of another Sir Humphrey Style in 1659. Over, the succeeding century or so, it passed through the hands of several other families and was converted into a farmhouse sometime previous to 1796, eventually falling into disrepair and being demolished around 1870.

=== The original Manor House ===
According to Dunkin. the original castle-like manor house was probably square in shape with fortified crenellated walls surrounded on all sides by a deep moat. Access was by a drawbridge on the northern side. The foundations of the walls were of "large flints intermixed with stone and cemented with strong lime mortar". and there were strong buttresses securing the angles into the moat. The Lord of the domain would have lived in apartements either within the outer walls or, more likely, in a separate structure within the central courtyard – the latter would have been more defensible. There was also a small terrace projecting from the eastern side of the house. Topographically, the house was situated "under the brow of a low hill" which would not have been the best location from the point of view of defence.

=== The 19th century Manor House ===
An account written in 1815 by Dunkin describes the existing manor house as formed of brick and timber, with evidence to suggest that it had been built in the 16th century on the foundations of a much older structure. Many of the original 16th century features were still apparent – such as the old fireplace in the hall, the original doorways, and wainscotting – but they were "much disfigured" by alterations carried out some years beforehand to convert the manor to a farmhouse. The northern and western sections of the moat had by then been filled in by the tenant, Jeremiah Ringer – who gives his name to the present nearby "Ringer's road".

There was also a suggestion, at the time, that the manor was haunted, with unexplained noises "being heard in and about the house" as if furniture was being dropped and broken. There were also reported ghostly sightings of a lady in white accompanied by a gentleman in dark clothes and a wide-brimmed hat.

A later account of 1831 by Henry Warren suggested that the building was remote from the public road and little known, but well worthy of notice due to its antiquity and picturesque quality. However the structure had by then fallen into a poor state of repair, evidenced by a review which described Simpson's Place as "an ancient edifice now condemned to be pulled down". Freeman, writing a few years later in 1838, also described the manor house as "timestricken", the rooms being "exceedingly large and lofty" and the staircases "very wide". He also confirmed its derelict state.

=== Present day ===
The former site of Simpson's manor house is now partially occupied by a Quaker meeting house at the junction of Ringer's road and Ravensbourne road.
