= Tromtö House =

- Location within Blekinge

General information
- Location: Blekinge, Sweden
- Coordinates: 56°09′40″N 15°29′08″E

Tromtö House (IPA: [ˈtrɔ̂mːtøː]; Swedish: Tromtö herrgård) is a manor house in Blekinge, Sweden.

== History ==
The manor is located on a small island, 5 kilometers west of Karlskrona in Ronneby Municipality. The original manor building was probably erected during the late 17th century. The manor became part of the Realm of Sweden in 1658 after Blekinge was transferred to Swedish rule under the terms of the Treaty of Roskilde. From the late 17th century, it been used as a summer residence by members of the noble Wachtmeister family. The house was given a new design in 1834, under the direction of Countess Agathe Wrede (1799-1890), widow of Count Hans Wachtmeister (1793-1827) acting governor of Blekinge county.

== Other sources ==
- Lönnbom Ingemar (2015) Blekinges byggnadsminnen: en källa till vår historia (Karlskrona: Länsstyrelsen i Blekinge län)
