= Sergiyevka =

Sergiyevka Сергиевка
- Selo
- Location within Astrakhan Oblast Location within Russia
- Coordinates: 45°58′N 47°37′E
- Country: Russia
- Region: Astrakhan Oblast
- District: Ikryaninsky District
- Time zone: UTC+4:00

Sergiyevka (Russian: Сергиевка) is a rural locality (a selo) and the administrative center of Sergiyevsky Selsoviet, Ikryaninsky District, Astrakhan Oblast, Russia. The population was 372 as of 2010. There are 3 streets.

== Geography ==
Sergiyevka is located 18 km south of Ikryanoye (the district's administrative centre) by road. Troitsky is the nearest rural locality.
