= Tułowice Mansion =

Coordinates: 50.5915°N 17.6571°E

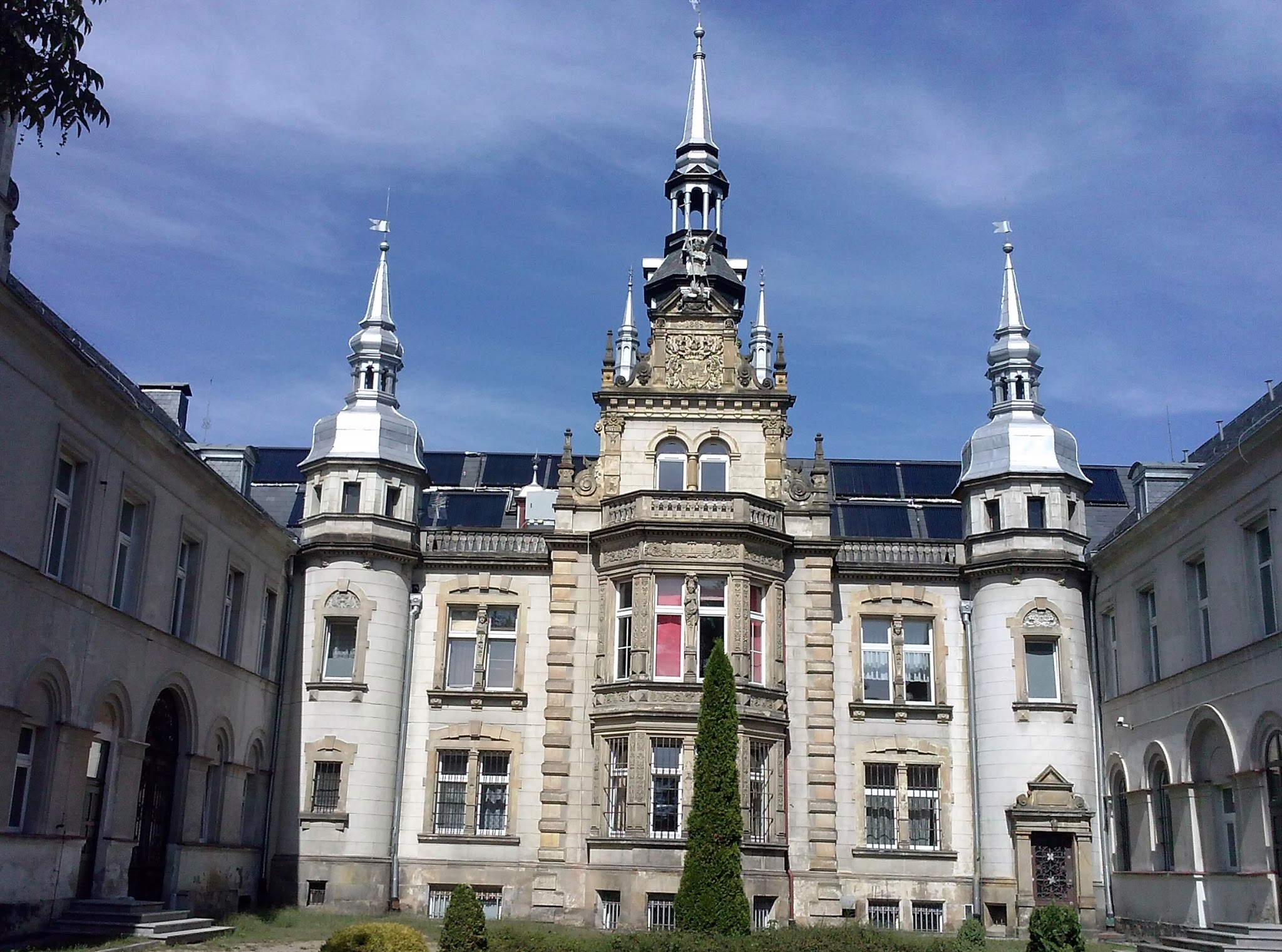
Tułowice Mansion

The Palace in Tułowice in southwestern Poland dates from the turn of the eighteenth and nineteenth centuries. It was built around 1800 for Francis of Lasocki and likely designed by Hilary Szpilowski, who created many classicist palaces in the Mazovia region. The Tułowice Mansion is one of the region's most beautiful landowners' residences. It exhibits harmony of form, architectural beauty and atmosphere.

== History ==
The Tułowice manor house was built around 1800 for Francis from Lasocki's family. Over the years, owners changed often. Linowski Constantine was in possession from 1822 to 1833. It then became the property of Orsetich until 1857. Mountain, then Marcel Divine, Hilary Ostrowski, from 1871 to the early twentieth century Bolechowskich was in possession, and in the interwar it went to Domaszowskich. Today, along with the park, it is owned by a private person, painter Andrzej Novák-Zempliński. The owners have respected the style in which the mansion was maintained and in the 80s built an outbuilding which also maintained a similar neoclassical spirit, also then in the park neo-Gothic chapel stood there.

Tułowice emphasizes an authentic collection of carriages, which is in the possession of the owner. This makes the mansion popular among fans of carriages and horse-drawn vehicles. It is the only collection in Poland, and the owner has 24 vehicles, most of the documented provenance. They are kept in a specially adapted, stylish carriage house, the former court stables.

== Building ==
The mansion is a ground-floor building with a higher central part of the house. It is preceded by a four column Tuscan portico crowned with a triangular pediment. The portico was placed in the garden elevation rather than the front elevation. This change of the front elevation and opening the living room for the view of the park is an expression of a new era of the Enlightenment.

This palace stands in opposition to the elegant Baroque palaces and endless courtyard garden. This is a quiet and intimate setting directed to the residents house where nature plays a very important role. This is a reference to the era of romanticism, which laid emphasis on the role of dreams and nature. From the front, the mansion is decorated with a modest break with a pair of Tuscan pilasters and triangular pediments.
