= Marielund, Karlskrona Municipality =

Marielund
- Location within Blekinge

General information
- Location: Blekinge, Sweden
- Coordinates: 56°13′08″N 15°31′59″E

Marielund is an estate with a manor house located in Nättraby, Karlskrona Municipality in Blekinge County, Sweden. The estate dates back to the 1600s. It was purchased in 1746 by nobleman Adam Johan Raab (1703-1776) who was the Governor of Kronoberg.
