= Göholms House =

Coordinates: 56°09′12″N 15°19′52″E

Göholms Gods
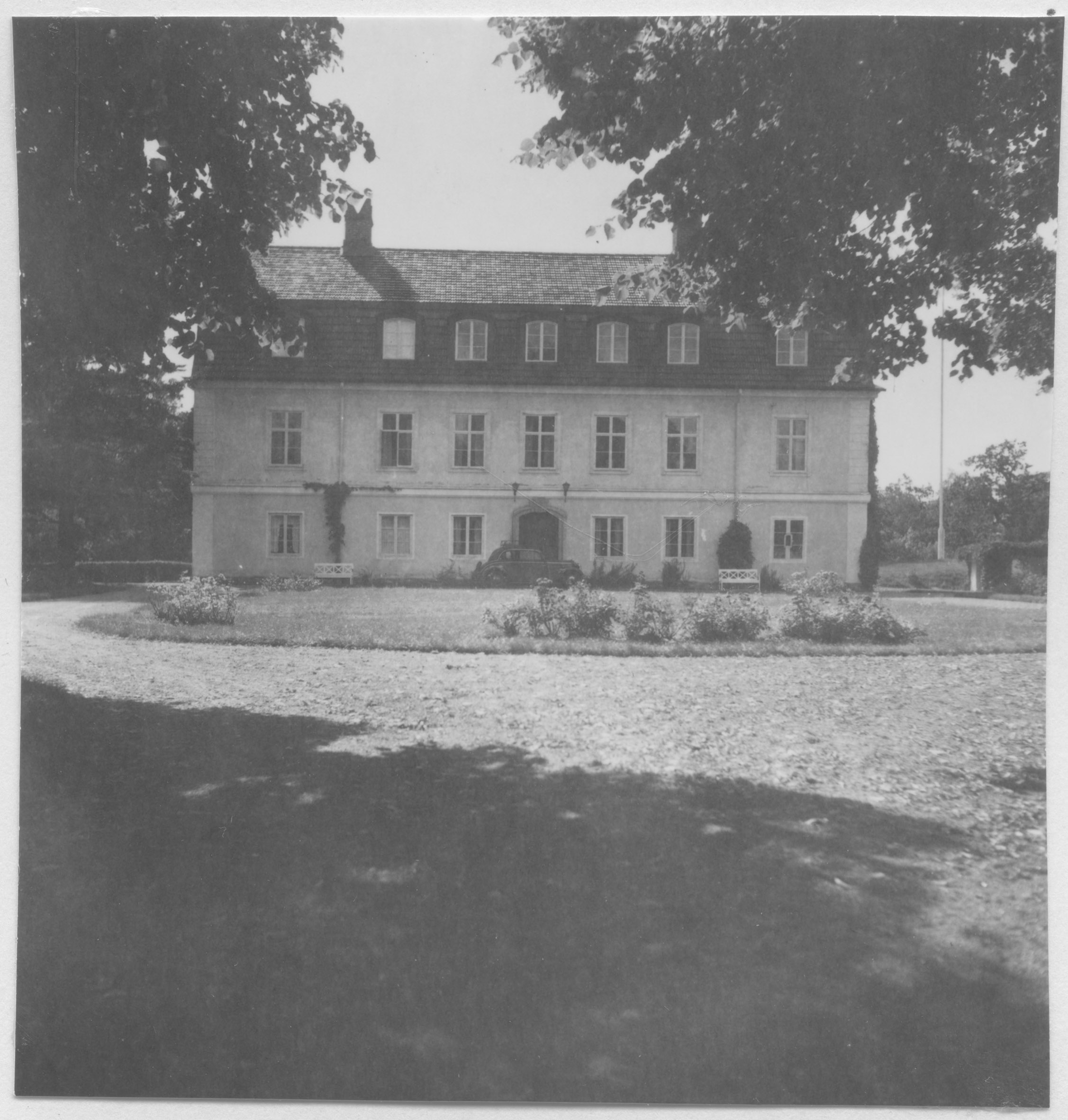
- Interactive map of the Göholms Gods area

General information
- Location: Ronneby Municipality, Blekinge County, Sweden, Sweden

Göholms House (Swedish: Göholms gods) is a manor house in Blekinge County, Sweden. It is located in the parish of Listerby in Ronneby Municipality.

== History ==
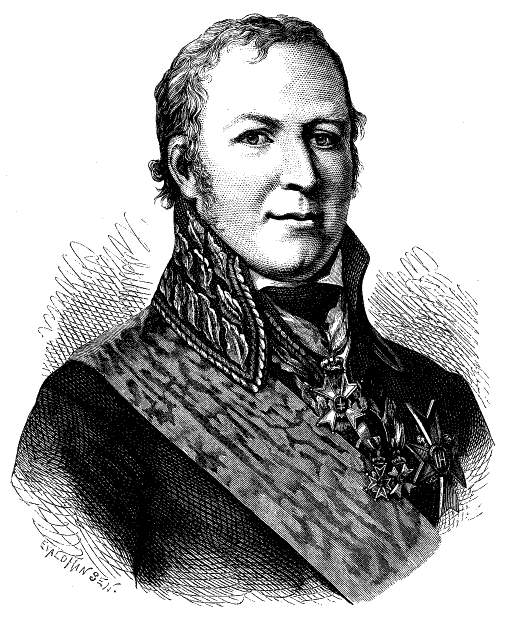
Admiral Johan Puke designed and built Göholms Manor House

Gö is mentioned for the first time during 1241 in the Danish Census Book of Valdemar II of Denmark (Danish: Kong Valdemars Jordebog).

Swedish Admiral and naval hero Johan Puke (1751-1816) bought the Gjöholm estate in 1790. Puke built a stately stone manor house according to its own drawings. Johan Puke was born in Ronneby in 1751. In 1777, he was appointed Lieutenant in the Royal Swedish Navy, in 1785 Puke became a Major and in 1803, Commanding Admiral of the Royal Swedish Naval Base at Karlskrona. He died during 1816 at Karlskrona.

== Related reading ==
- Norman,Hans (2008) Johan Puke: skeppsgossen som blev generalamiral och statsråd 1751-1816 (Bokförlaget Atlantis) ISBN 9789173532556
