= Augerum House =

- Augerums herrgård
- Location within Blekinge

General information
- Location: Blekinge, Sweden
- Coordinates: 56°13′2.5″N 15°40′34.7″E

Augerum House (Swedish: Augerums herrgård) is a manor house in Blekinge, Sweden. It is located in Augerum north of Karlskrona. The manor house has two main buildings, the older one built about 1720 by pharmacist Johan Eberhard Ferber (1678-1761); the newer one, called Stora Hus, in 1810 by Admiral Providence Master Carl Schweber. In 1855, the property was bought by Chancellor of Justice Nils von Koch (1801-1881) and his spouse Frances F. Lewin (1804-1888). The estate is still owned by members of their family.
