= Skärva House =

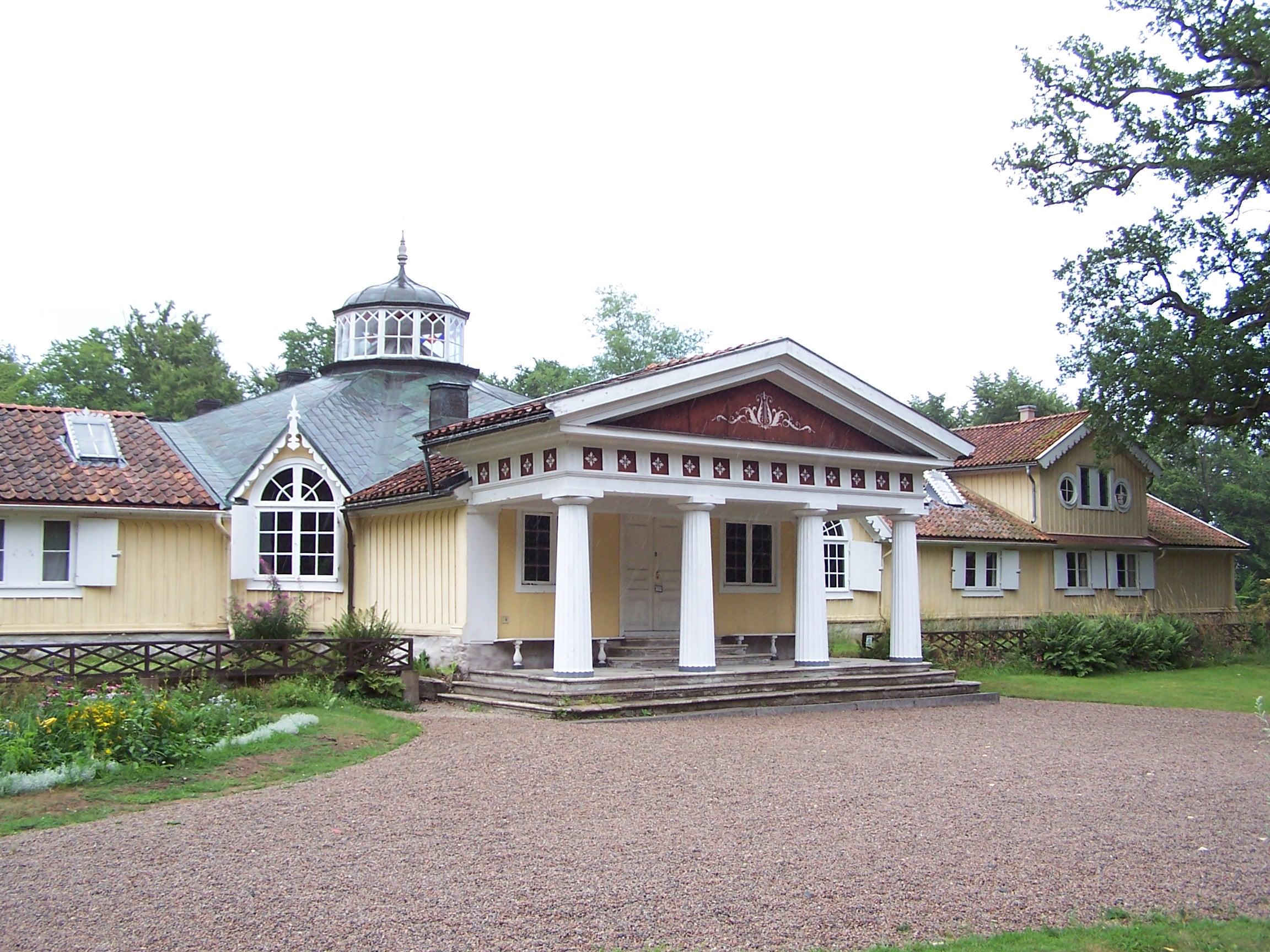

- Location within Blekinge

General information
- Location: Blekinge, Karlskrona, Sweden
- Coordinates: 56°12′05″N 15°34′21″E

Skärva Manor (Swedish: Skärva herrgård) is the country house that shipbuilder Fredrik Henrik af Chapman made on the mainland, just northwest of Karlskrona and east of Nättraby. Behind the project, Gustav III commanded Chapman to move to Karlskrona to develop a build-up for the Kingdom's fleet. Skärva were thus an important workplace and where hydrodynamic experiments could be tested for shipbuilding at its park where there was a water pond. Skärva Mansion is today privately owned and a listed building since 1976. The manor house is also part of the World Heritage Naval City of Karlskrona and is located within the Skärva Natural Reserve.

== Main building ==
When shipbuilder Fredrik Henrik af Chapman (1721–1808) was 64 years old he decided to build a farm just outside the city. This was common in the higher classes at the time and around Karlskrona there are several such mansions. In 1785 he bought parts of the village Skärva, and to draw the building's plans he took the help of his close friend Carl August Ehrensvärd (1745–1800), artist and architect. Ehrensvärd brought inspiration from his trip to Italy while the crown contributed with materials and labor. The building was completed in 1786 as a farmhouse or southern Swedish cottage with red-tailed walls and peat roofs. Later, Chapman was able to rebuild the cottage to its present original look with classicist features. For the entrance, a tight portico with four doric columns carries a pediment and the house has been described as a crossing of Greek temple, Italian dome church and an Blekinge log cabin. The house consists of five smaller constrictions that form an H. The central building body is crowned with a lantern.

== Interior ==
South of the main entrance was Chapman's private residence, and in the south of the house a Chinese cabinet was placed in and hundreds of watercolours and Chinese Junks were stored until 2013. Upstairs there is a smaller room accessed through a narrow staircase. This is Chapman's chamber for work whose interior is inspired by the sea and resembles a small quay, and from here he could look all the way to the naval city on the other side of Denmark's fjord. In the middle of the house there is an octagonal dome hall, a variant of Pantheon in Rome. Light flows from the arcuate side windows and the roofed glass lantern, which in Chapman's time lit up his big work table with different vessel models. On one corner, Sergel's bust of Gustav III was also a financial reminder. The northern part of the house was used as housing for the servants, and there were also economic spaces, while the kitchen itself was in the center of the house. During the rebuilding of the 1860s, the entire eastern and middle part were converted into housing.

== Other buildings ==
The gazebo, called the Temple of Diana, is inspired by the ancient temple. The drawings are preserved at the National Museum. The Gothic-style clock tower was built in 1790. It's one of the first examples of Swedish Neogothic. Down by the beach a bathhouse stands and in the park a hermit cave for individual thinking has existed, but the so-called Moss cave has long been gone. Near the main building there is an English park and behind in a lush hillside on the sea side, there is Chapman's intended tomb, a walled crypt which he never rested in, since he sold Skärva two years before his death. The space behind the rough stone blocks has now become a sheltered residence for black grass snake.

== Fredrik Henrik of Chapman's grave ==
At the beginning of the 1790s, Chapman made various suggestions for a tomb chamber and in 1795 he had decided to construct a simple one on the slope towards the sea. From here Karlskrona seemed beyond the horizon of the bay. Chapman later sold Skärva in 1806 and came to be buried at Augerum Cemetery.

== Current owner ==
Fredrik Henrik of Chapman lived at Skärva until 1806 when he sold the property. Next owner became merchant Johan Humble and then the Christersson family. In 1863 the manor was bought by Hans Hansson Wachtmeister (1860-1929), whereby the manor house was home to his mother Agathe. The house was now provided with a yellow-painted panel, the shutters were painted white and the roof was tiled. The manor is now owned by German native Henry Nold since 2014.

== Owner ==
- Fredrik Henrik of Chapman 1784-1806
- Merchant Johan Humble 1806-1830
- The Christiersson family later Christiernin 1830-1863
- The Wachtmeister Family 1863-1999
- Cecilia Skröder, f Wachtmeister, g. M. Thomas Skröder 1999-2013.
- Henry Nold from Darmstadt in Germany 2014.

== Gallery ==
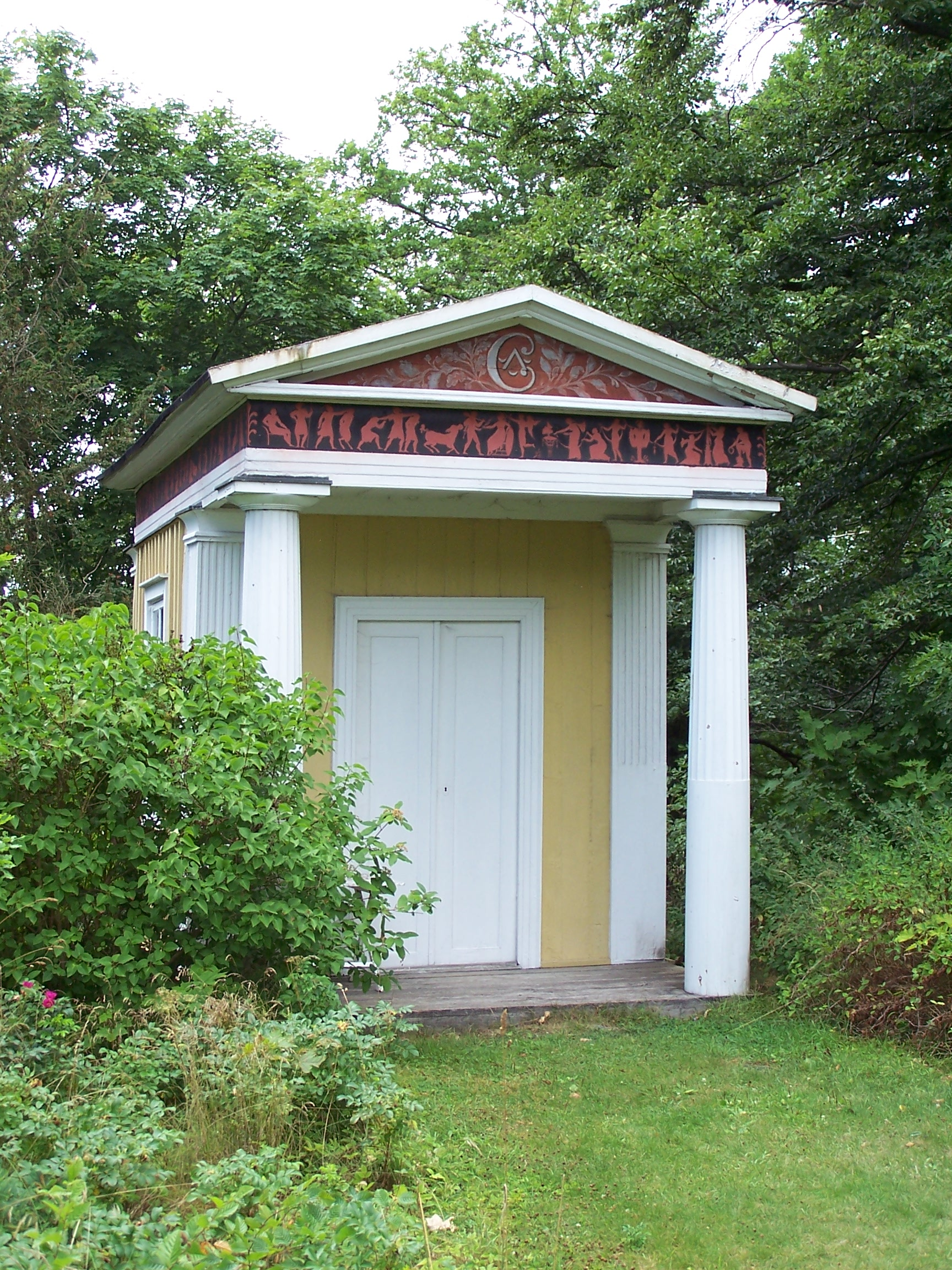
The Diana temple

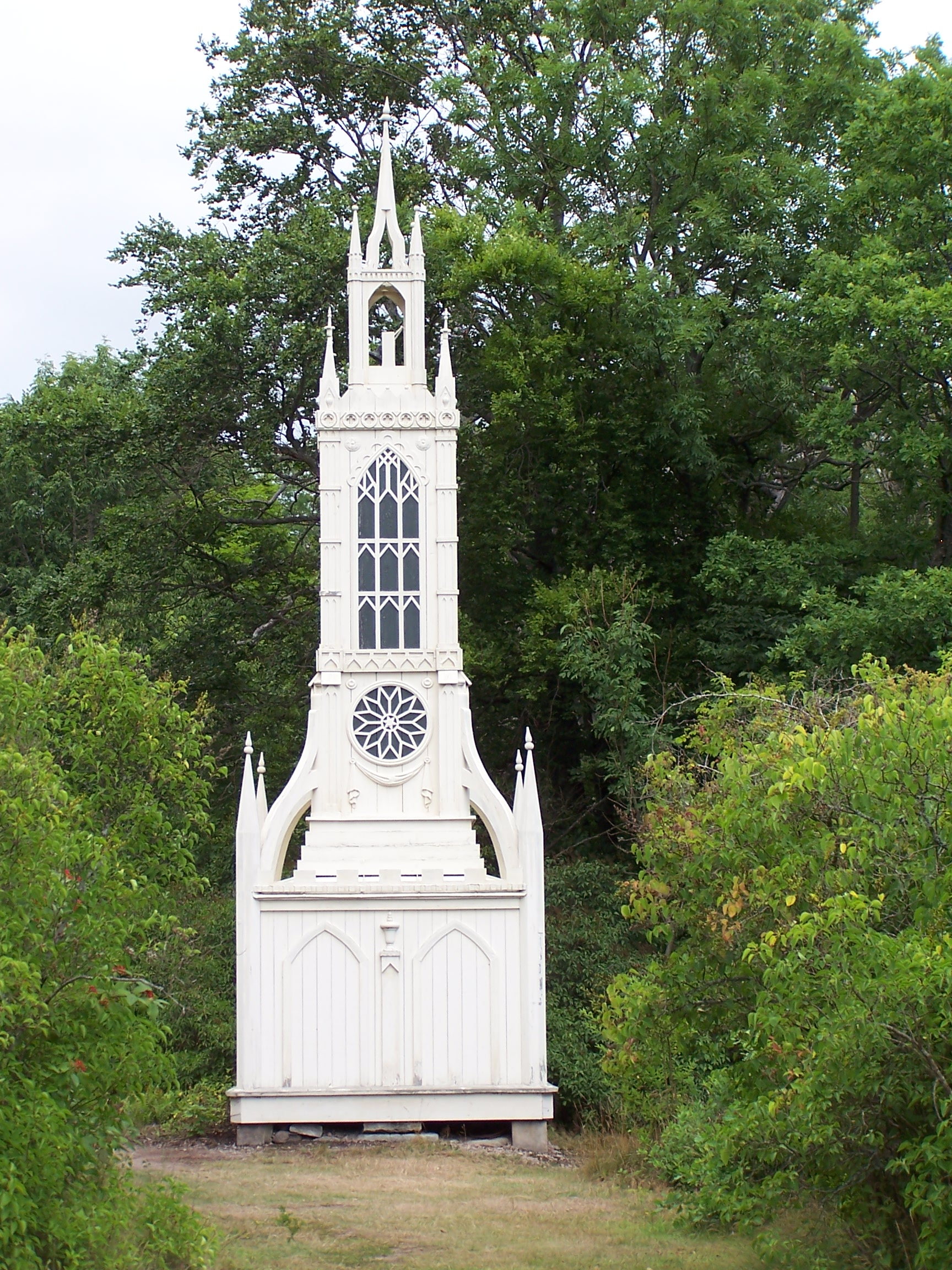
Clock Tower

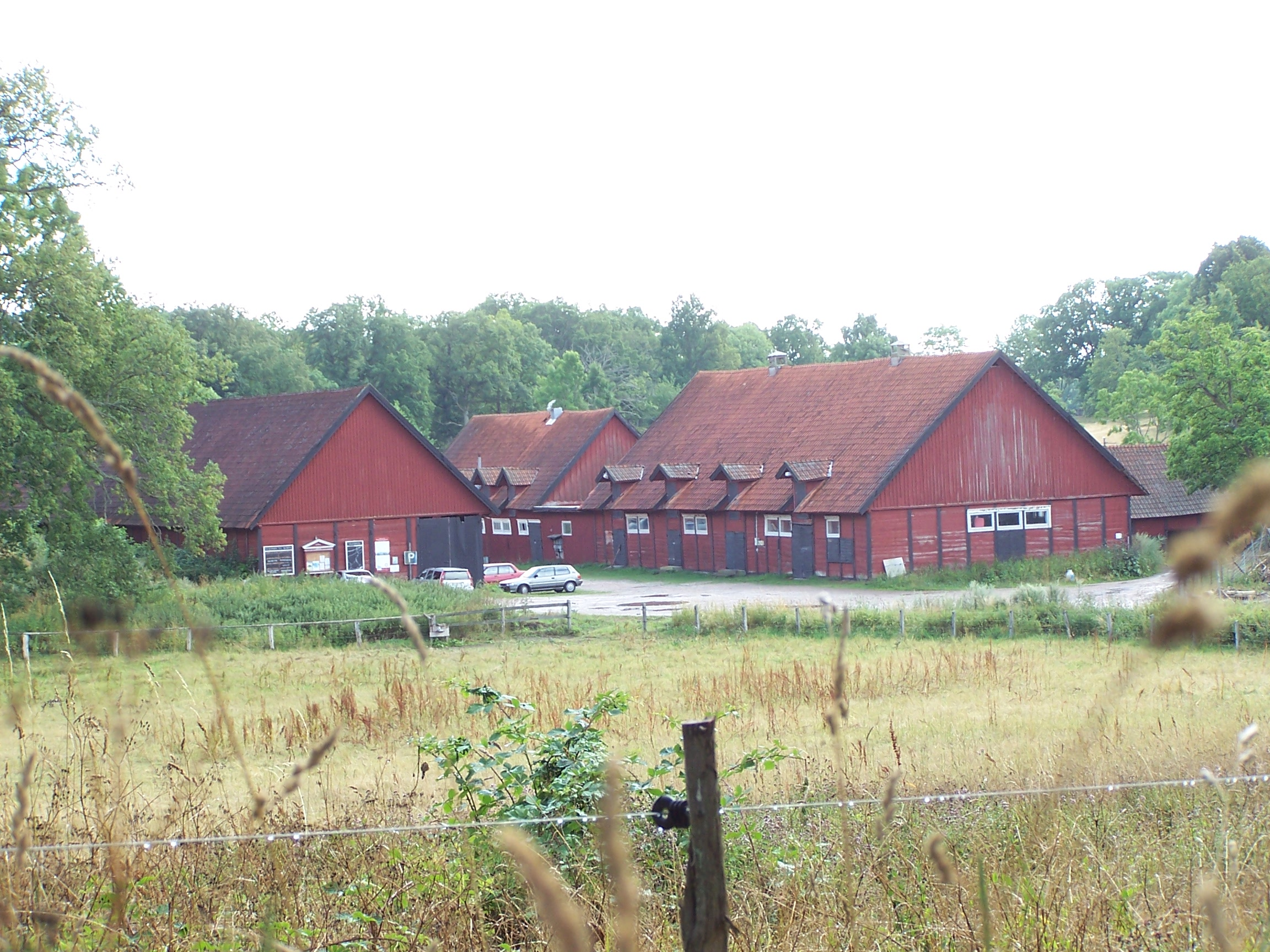
Skärva's farmhouses

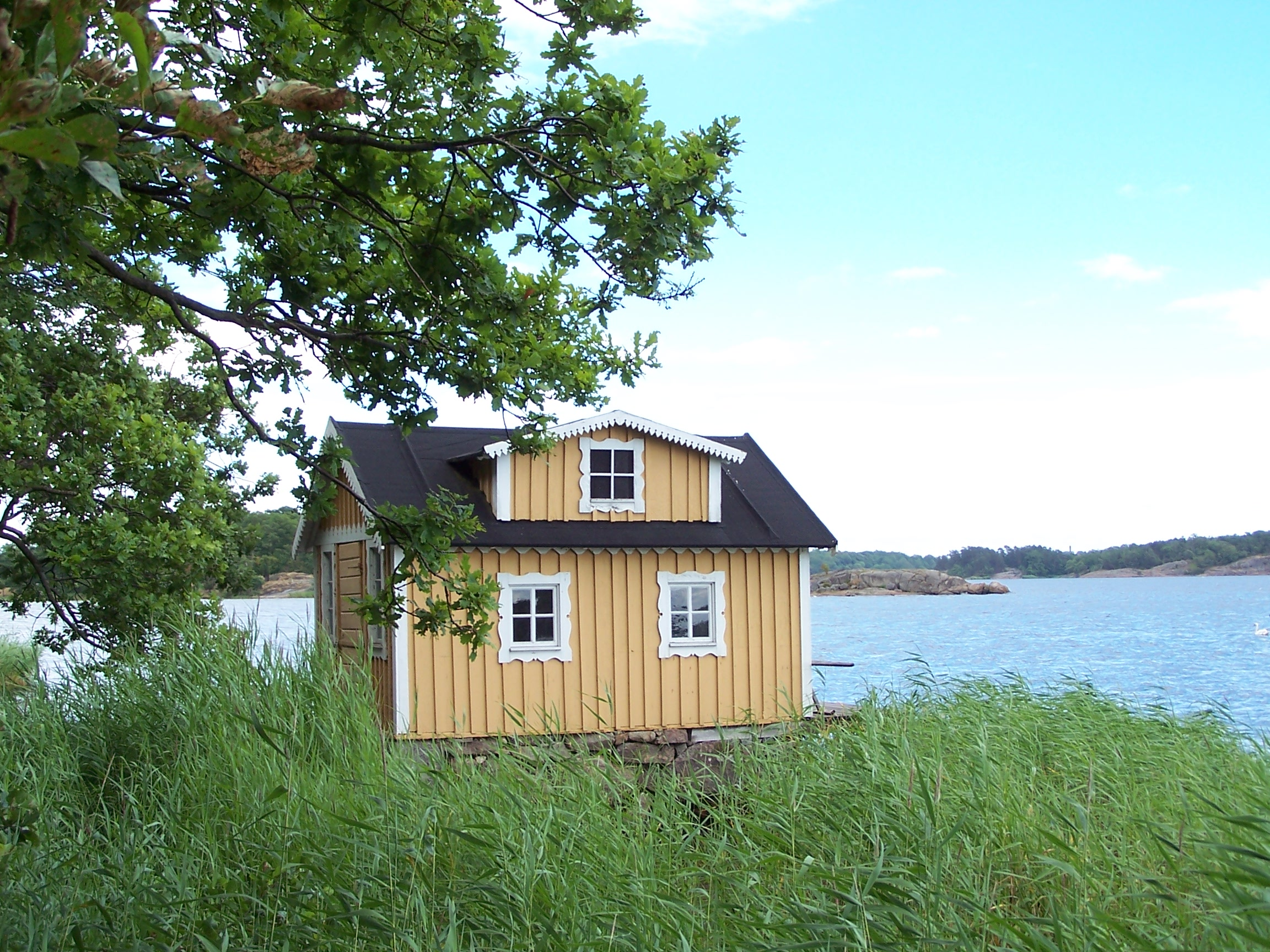
The bathhouse at the Harbor

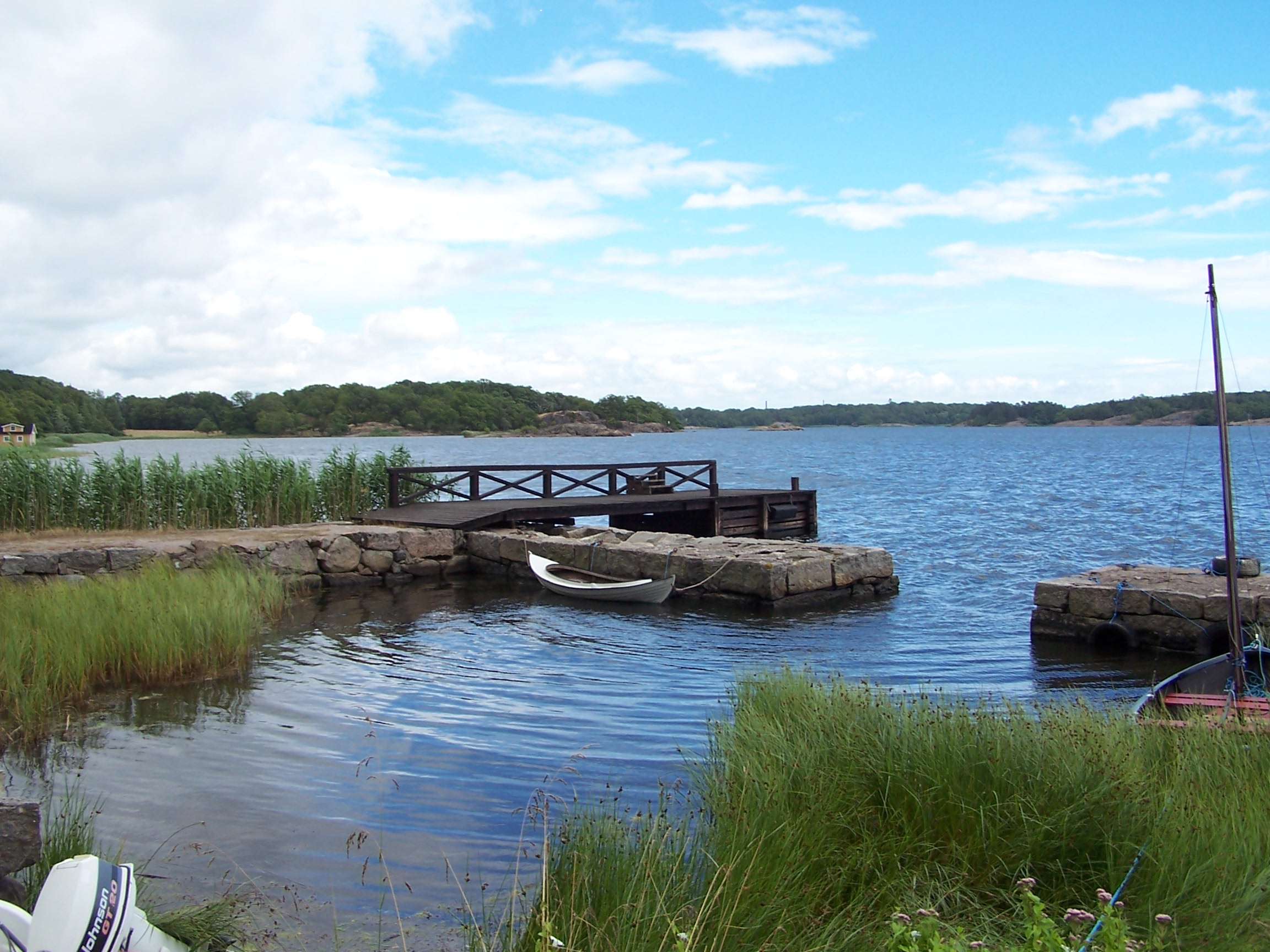
The Harbor
