= Manor house =

Main residence of the lord of a manor

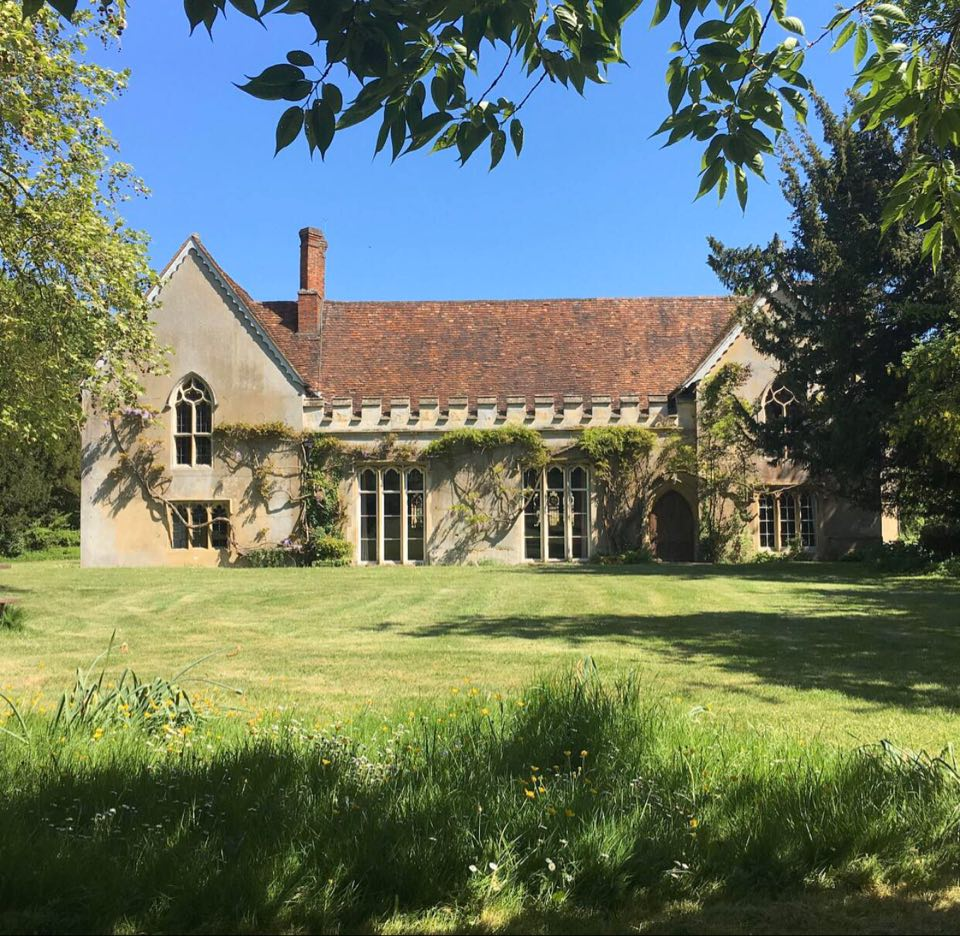
The Abbey, Sutton Courtenay in Oxfordshire (previously Berkshire), considered to be a "textbook" example of the English medieval manor house

A manor house was historically the main residence of the lord of the manor. The house formed the administrative centre of a manor in the European feudal system; within its great hall were usually held the lord's manorial courts, communal meals with manorial tenants and great banquets. The term is today loosely (though erroneously) applied to various English country houses, mostly at the smaller end of the spectrum, sometimes dating from the Late Middle Ages, which currently or formerly house the landed gentry.

Manor houses were sometimes fortified, albeit not as fortified as castles, but this was often more for show than for defence. They existed in most European countries where feudalism was present.

== Function ==
The lord of the manor may have held several properties within a county or, for example in the case of a feudal baron, spread across a kingdom, which he occupied only on occasional visits. Even so, the business of the manor was directed and controlled by regular manorial courts, which appointed manorial officials such as the bailiff, granted copyhold leases to tenants, resolved disputes between manorial tenants and administered justice in general. A large and suitable building was required within the manor for such purpose, generally in the form of a great hall, and a solar might be attached to form accommodation for the lord.

The produce of a small manor might be insufficient to feed a lord and his large family for a full year, and thus he would spend only a few months at each manor and move on to another where stores had been laid up. This also gave the opportunity for the vacated manor house to be cleaned, especially important in the days of the cess-pit, and repaired. Thus such non-resident lords needed to appoint a steward or seneschal to act as their deputy in such matters and to preside at the manorial courts of his different manorial properties. The day-to-day administration was carried out by a resident official in authority at each manor, who in England was called a bailiff, or reeve.

== Architecture ==
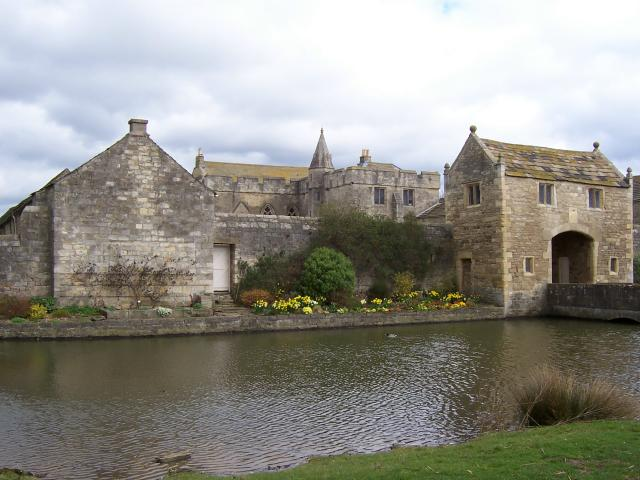
Markenfield Hall in North Yorkshire, a 14th-century manor house with moat and gatehouse

Although not typically built with strong fortifications as were castles, many manor-houses were fortified, which required a royal licence to crenellate. They were often enclosed within walls or ditches which often also included agricultural buildings. Arranged for defence against roaming bands of robbers and thieves, in days long before police, they were often surrounded by a moat with a drawbridge, and were equipped with gatehouses and watchtowers, but not, as for castles, with a keep, large towers or lofty curtain walls designed to withstand a siege. The primary feature of the manor house was its great hall, to which subsidiary apartments were added as the lessening of feudal warfare permitted more peaceful domestic life.

By the beginning of the 16th century, manor houses as well as small castles began to acquire the character and amenities of the residences of country gentlemen, and many defensive elements were dispensed with, for example Sutton Place in Surrey, c. 1521. A late 16th-century transformation produced many of the smaller Renaissance châteaux of France and the numerous country mansions of the Elizabethan and Jacobean styles in England. These would eventually evolve into country houses with the estate replacing the manor.

== History in England ==
Manor houses were often built in close proximity to the village for ease, as they served not just as a home for the lord of the manor, but as a centre of administration for those who lived or travelled within the bounds of the manor. In some instances, they needed to be able to hold meetings of the Manorial court.

Nearly every large medieval manor house had its own deer-park adjoining, imparked (i.e. enclosed) by royal licence, which served primarily as a store of food in the form of venison. Within these licensed parks deer could not be hunted by royalty (with its huge travelling entourage which needed to be fed and entertained), nor by neighbouring land-owners nor by any other persons.

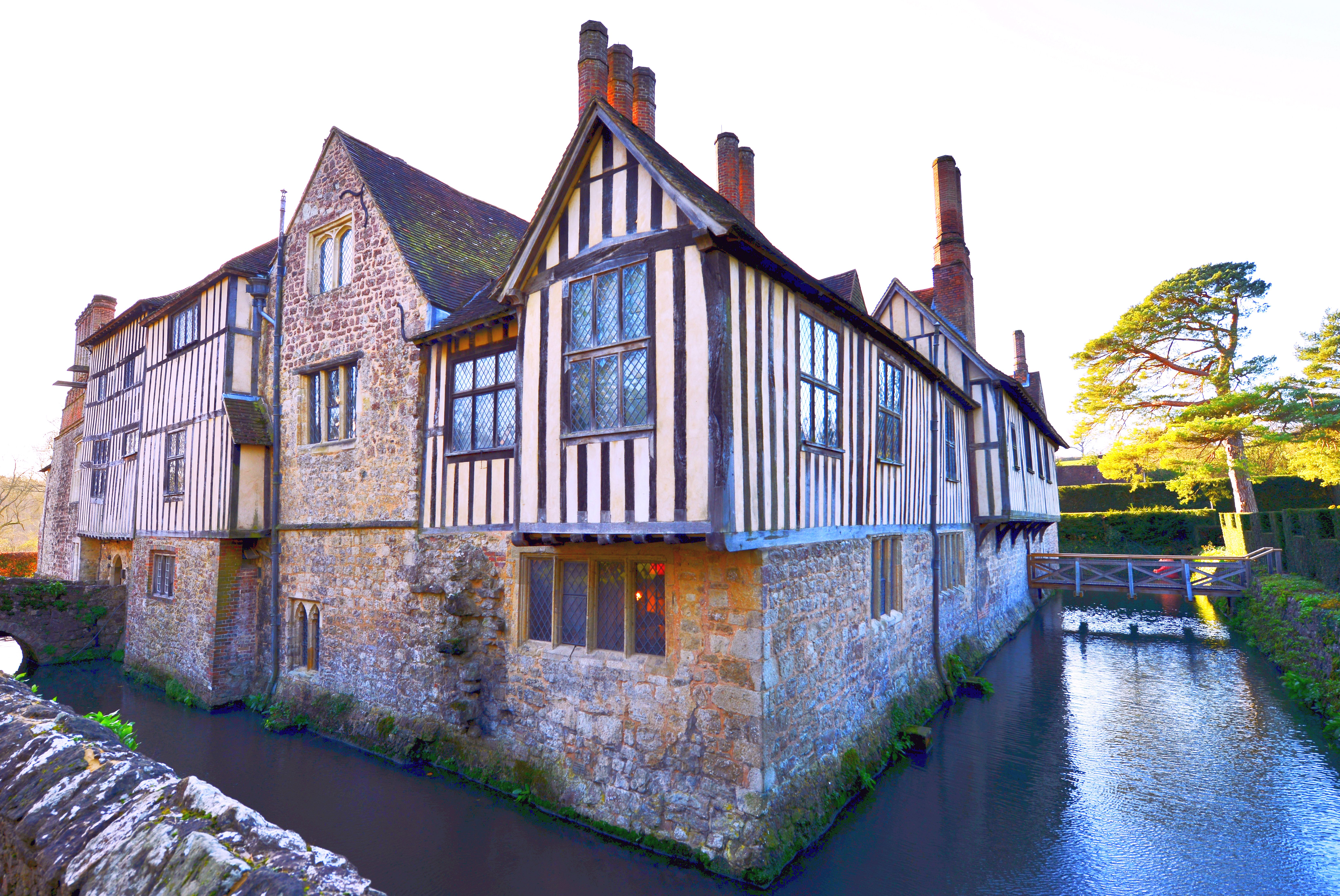
Ightham Mote, a 14th-century moated manor house in Kent, England

=== Decline of the manor house ===
Before around 1600, larger houses were usually fortified, generally for true defensive purposes but increasingly, as the kingdom became internally more peaceable after the Wars of the Roses, as a form of status symbol, reflecting the position of their owners as having been worthy to receive royal licence to crenellate. The Tudor period (16th century) of stability in England saw the building of the first of the unfortified great houses, for example Sutton Place in Surrey, circa 1521.

The Dissolution of the Monasteries under King Henry VIII resulted in many former monastical properties being sold to the King's favourites, who then converted them into private country houses, examples being Woburn Abbey, Forde Abbey, Nostell Priory and many other mansions with the suffix Abbey or Priory to their name.

During the second half of the reign of Queen Elizabeth I (1558–1603) and under her successor King James I (1603–1625) the first mansions designed by architects not by mere masons or builders, began to make their appearance. Such houses as Burghley House, Longleat House, and Hatfield House are among the best known of this period and seem today to epitomise the English country house.

During the 16th century, many lords of manors moved their residences from their ancient manor houses often situated next to the parish church and near or in the village and built a new manor house within the walls of their ancient deer-parks adjoining. This gave them more privacy and space.

== Naming ==
While suffixes given to manor houses in recent centuries have little substantive meaning, and many have changed over time, (Note: What is today known as "Heanton Satchville", for example, was "Heanton House" in the 18th century and "Heanton Court" in the 19th century.) in previous centuries manor names had specific connotations.

- Court – This suffix came into use in the 16th century and was applied to the buildings where lords would receive their tenants (i.e., "hold court").
- Castle – Non-royal castles were generally the residences of feudal barons, whose baronies might comprise several dozen other manors. The manor on which the castle was situated was termed the caput of the barony, thus every true ancient defensive castle was also the manor house of its own manor. The suffix "-Castle" was also used to name certain manor houses, generally built as mock castles, but often as houses rebuilt on the site of a former true castle:
- Place – The "Place" suffix is likely to have been a shortened form of "Palace", a term commonly used in Renaissance Italy (Palazzo) to denote a residence of the nobility.
- Park – came into use in the 18th and 19th centuries
- 'Manor' Suffix - Romantic Revival - Manor houses, although mostly forming residences for the lords of the manors on which they were situated, were not historically named with the suffix "Manor", as were many grand country houses built in the 19th century, such as Hughenden Manor or Waddesdon Manor.

The usage is often today used as a modern catch-all suffix for an old house on an estate, true manor or not.

== Similar constructions ==
- Tower Houses – Tower houses, including Peel towers, were constructed in the wilder parts of England, usually in the marches. They served a defensive purpose, built as a solid fortified keep, they were designed to protect inhabitants from raids by border reivers. Though the lord lived in the tower and their followers lived in simple huts outside the walls, the towers were designed to provide a refuge so that, when cross-border raiding parties arrived, the whole population of a village could take to the tower and wait for the marauders to depart.
- Lodges – Some of the land in England was designated as Royal forest during the feudal era. These areas were under forest law, which was historically distinct from the law of the rest of the country and operated outside the common law, serving to protect game animals and their forest habitat from destruction. Kings would appoint 'Wardens', 'Keepers', or 'Guardians' to oversee these lands, who would often be provided Lodges that functioned similarly to manor houses.
- Clergy dwellings – As the often second most important individual in a feudal manor, clergy dwellings often incorporated many of the elements of a manor house. Some manors were themselves clerical and so the manor house and vicarage/rectory were one and the same. Properties such as rectories in England were often supported by their own Glebe – land within the parish/manor set aside to support a parish priest.

== In other countries ==
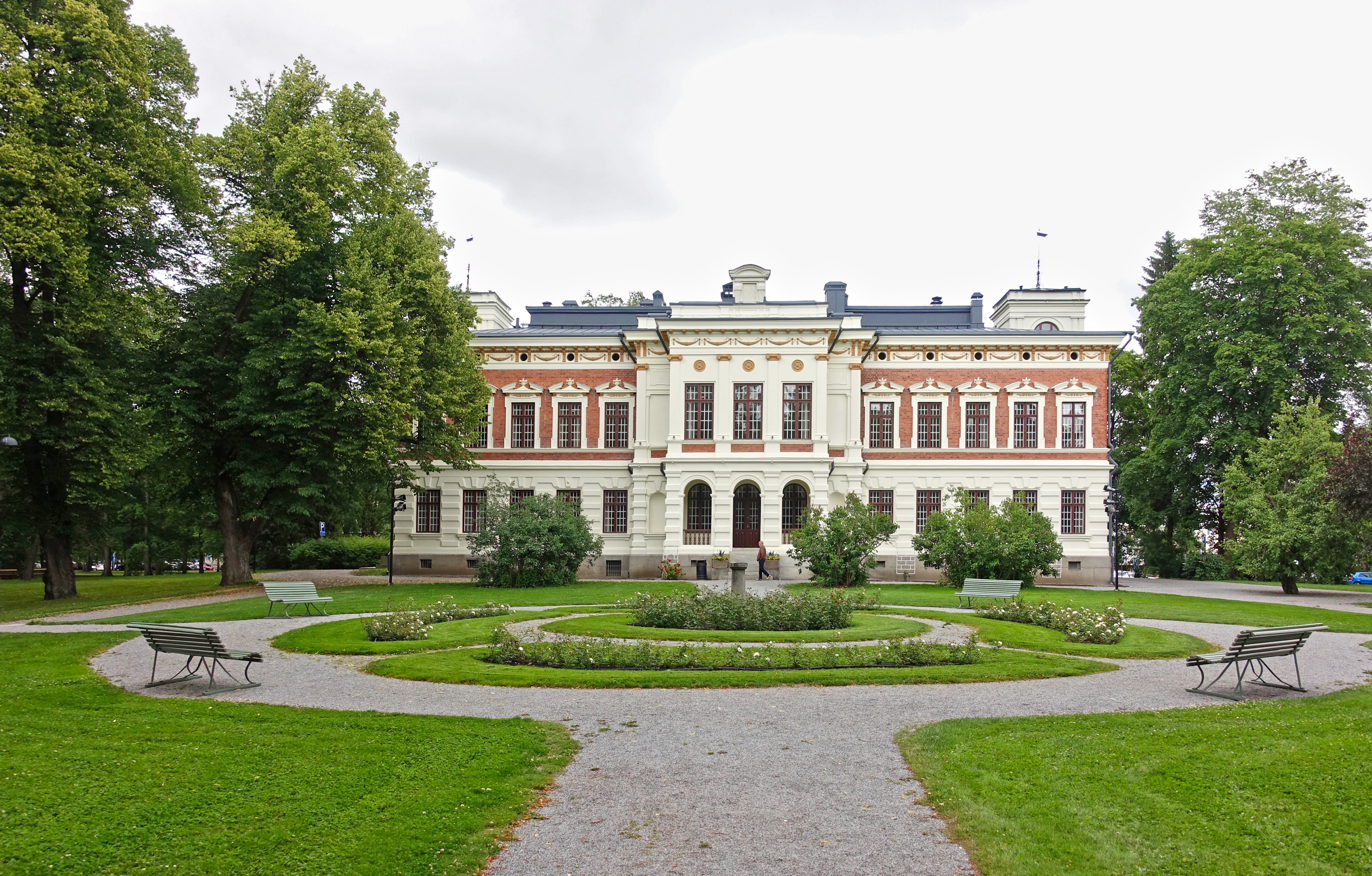
A 19th-century main building of the Hatanpää Manor in Tampere, Finland

Golf Hill, near Shelford, Victoria, Australia

=== Australia ===
In Australia, the term "manor" is occasionally used, often informally, in place of "mansion" to describe substantial historic residences, particularly prominent homesteads constructed during the pastoral boom of the 19th century. Many of these estates were built by wealthy landholders who sought to emulate the architectural idioms of English country houses, incorporating elements such as symmetrical façades, grand entrance halls, and landscaped grounds. Examples include Château Kolor, whose French-influenced nomenclature reflects the broader aspiration toward European aristocratic styles, and Leslie Manor, a substantial Western District homestead, noted for its scale and formal composition.

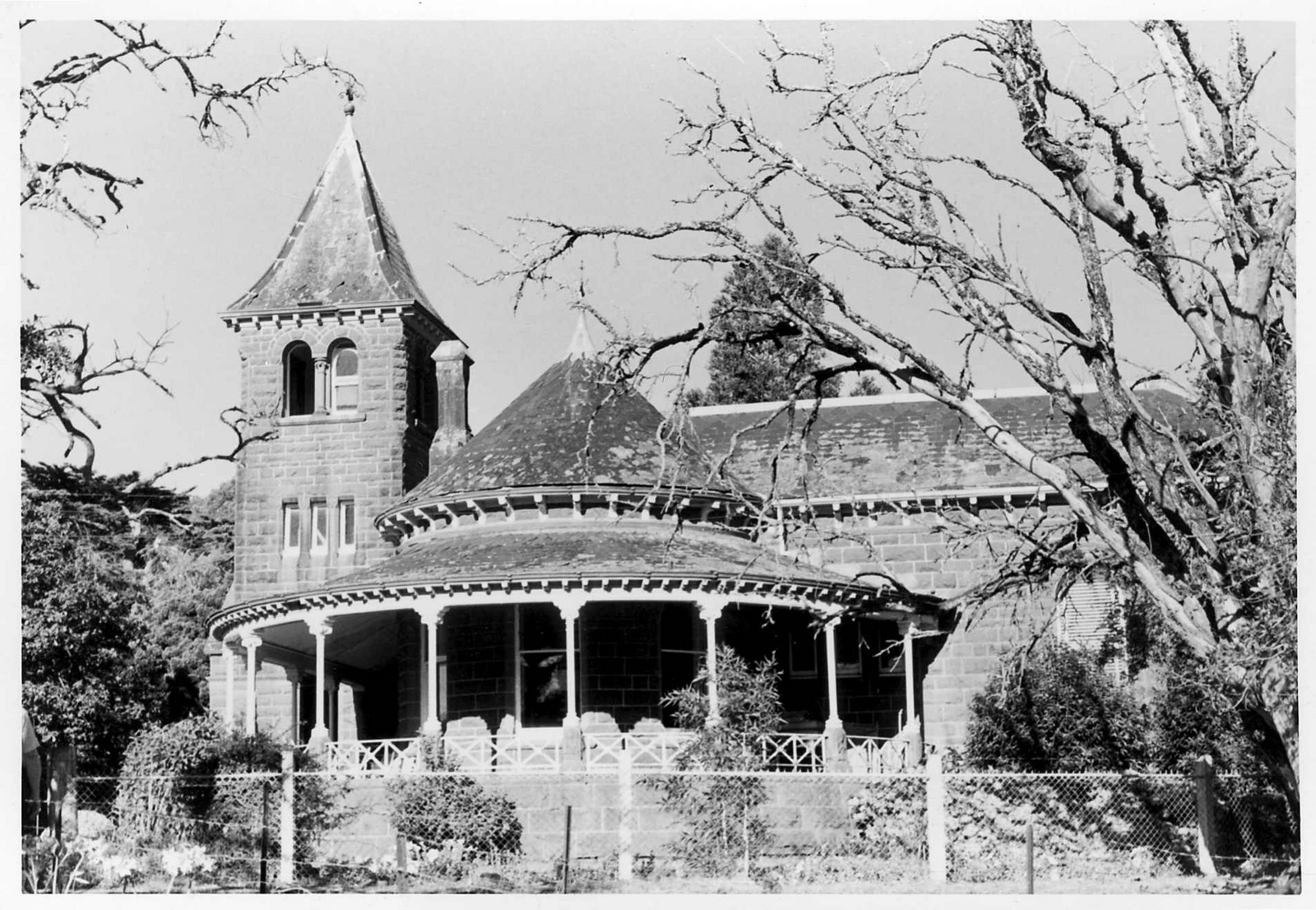
Château Kolor, Penshurst, Victoria, Australia

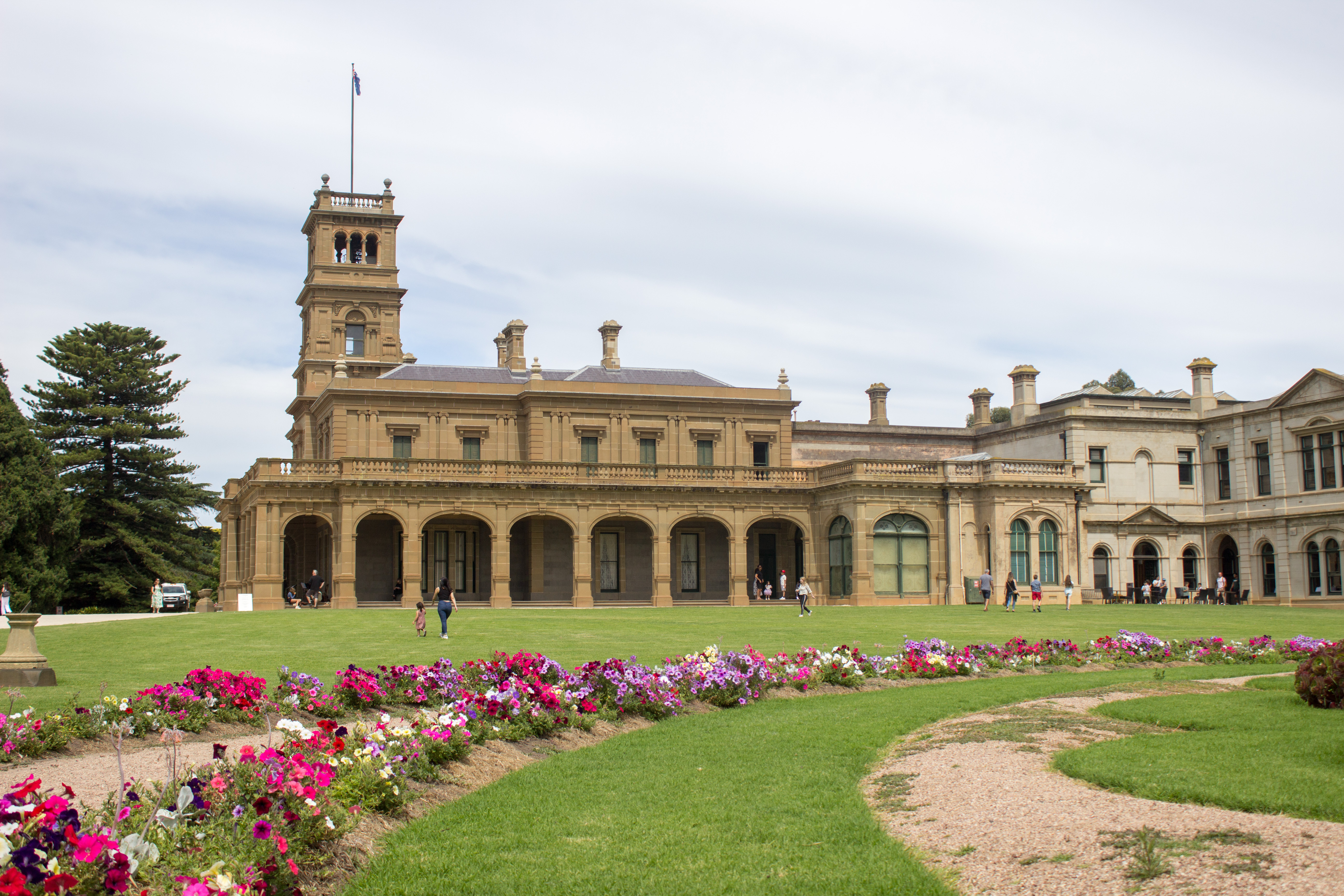
Werribee Park Mansion, Werribee, Victoria, Australia

=== France ===
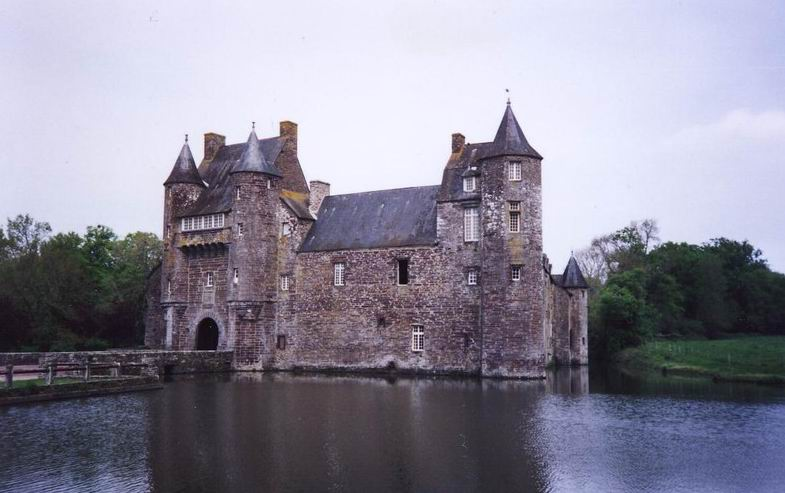
Château de Trécesson, a 14th-century manor-house in Morbihan, Brittany

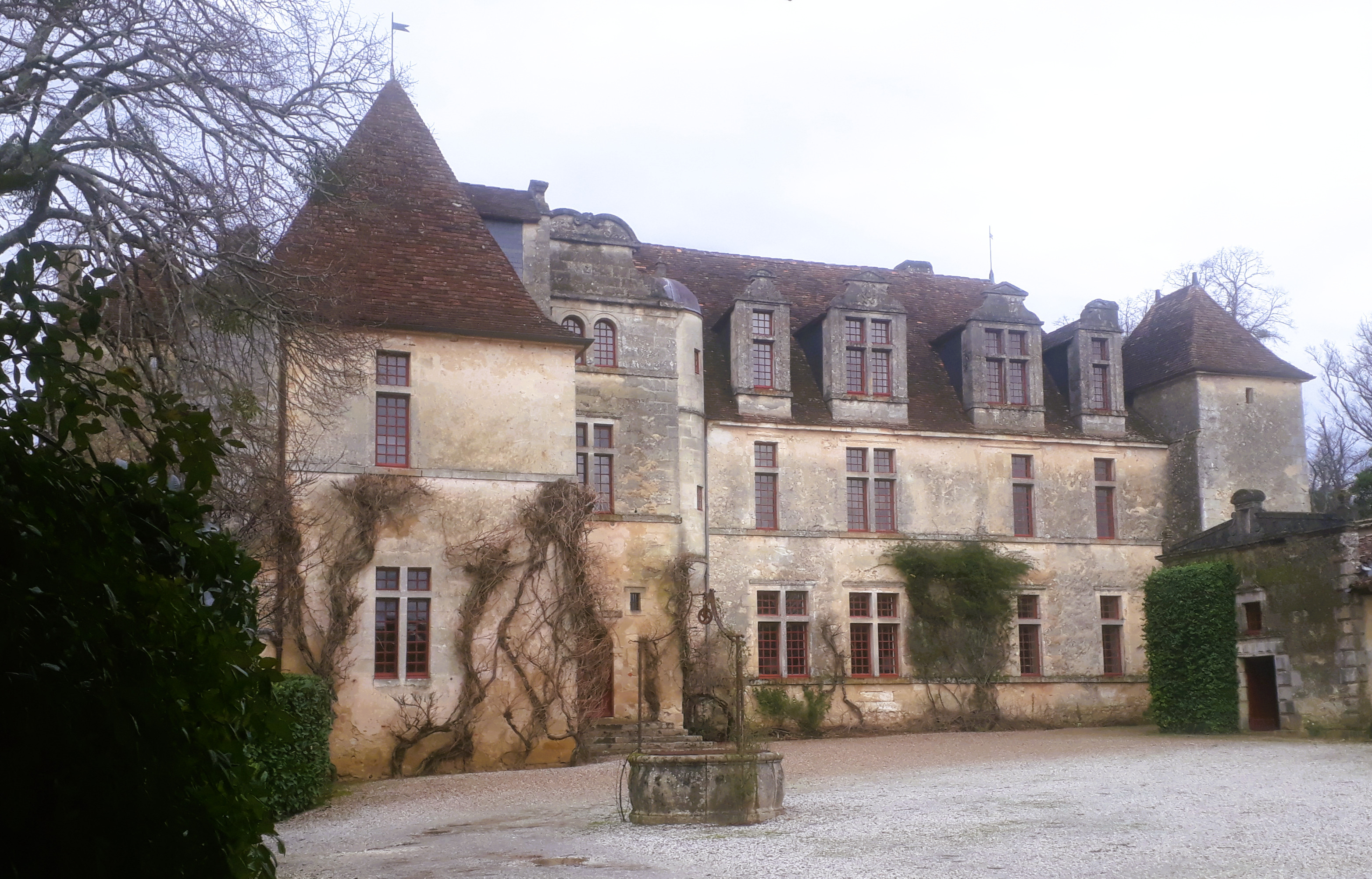
Château Le Grand Verdus, 16th-century manor house and Bordeaux wine estate, Aquitaine

In France, the terms château or manoir are often used synonymously to describe a French manor house; maison-forte is the appellation for a strongly fortified house, which may include two sets of enclosing walls, drawbridges, and a ground-floor hall or salle basse that was used to receive peasants and commoners. The term manoir is used historically only in Normandy and in Brittany. The salle basse was also the location of the manorial court, with the steward or seigneur's seating location often marked by the presence of a crédence de justice or wall-cupboard (shelves built into the stone walls to hold documents and books associated with administration of the demesne or droit de justice).

The salle haute or upper-hall, reserved for the seigneur and where he received his high-ranking guests, was often accessible by an external spiral staircase. It was commonly "open" up to the roof trusses, as in similar English homes. This larger and more finely decorated hall was usually located above the ground-floor hall. The seigneur and his family's private chambres were often located off the upper first-floor hall, and invariably had their own fireplace (with finely decorated chimney-piece) and frequently a latrine.

In addition to having both lower and upper halls, many French manor houses also had partly fortified gateways, watchtowers, and enclosing walls that were fitted with arrow or gun loops for added protection. Some larger 16th-century manors, such as the Château de Kerjean in Finistère, Brittany, were even outfitted with ditches and fore-works that included gun platforms for cannons. These defensive arrangements allowed maisons-fortes and rural manors to be safe from a coup de main perpetrated by an armed band, many of which roamed the countryside during the troubled times of the Hundred Years War and the French wars of religion; but these fortified manor houses could not have withstood a lengthy siege undertaken by a regular army equipped with (siege) engines or heavy artillery.

=== Germany ===
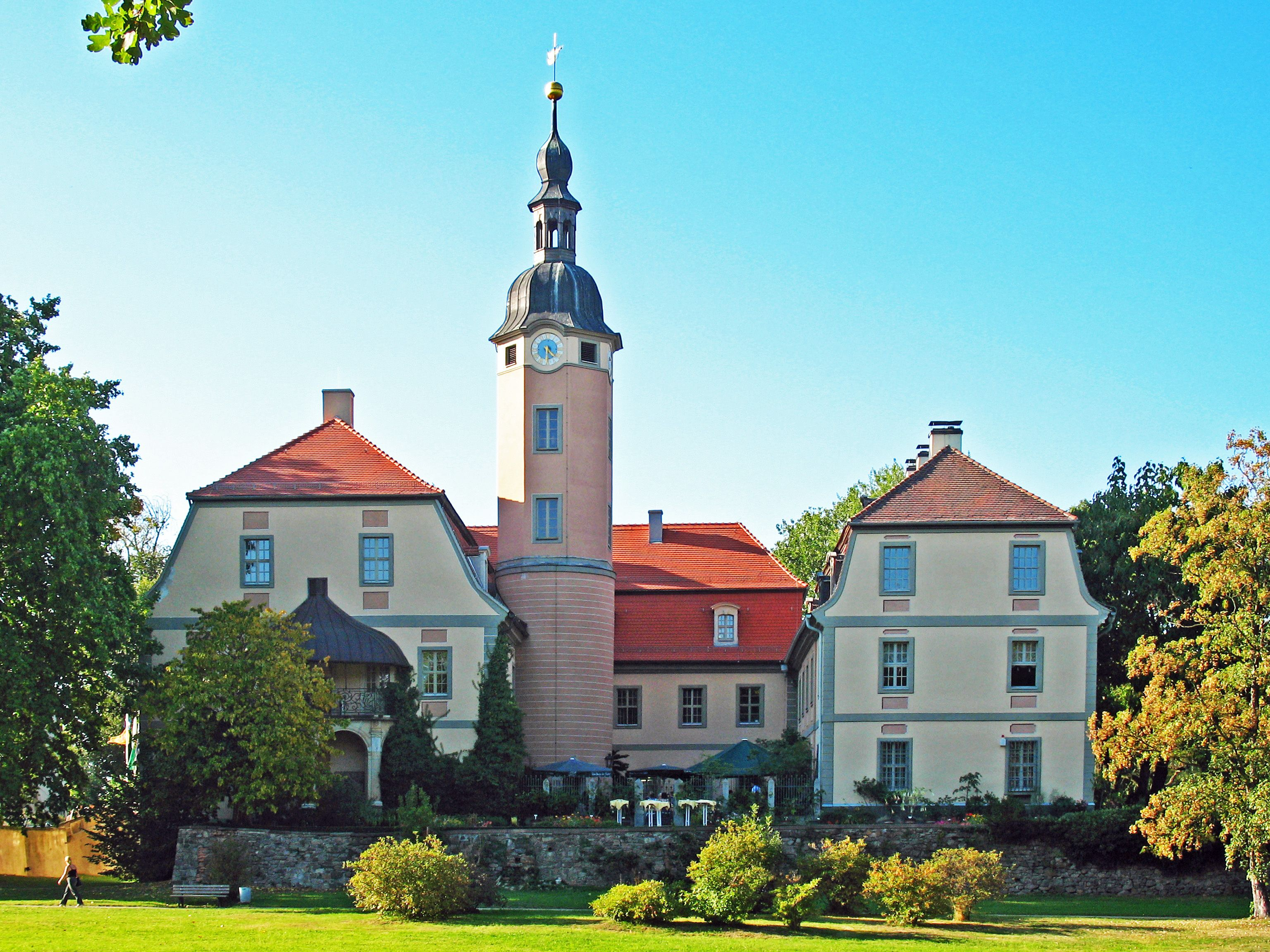
Schloss Machern (Machern Castle) near Leipzig is an example of a typical manor house, it evolved from a medieval castle which was originally protected by a water moat and later was converted into a baroque-style castle with typical architectural features of the period and one of the first English-style parks in Germany.

The German equivalent of a manor house is a Gutshaus (or Gut, Gutshof, Rittergut, Landgut or Bauerngut). Also Herrenhaus and Domäne are common terms. Schloss (pl. Schlösser) is another German word for a building similar to manor house, stately home, château or palace. Other terms used in German are Burg (castle), Festung (fort/fortress) and Palais/Palast (palace).

German language uses terms like Schloss or Gutshaus for places that functioned as the administrative center of a manor. Gut(shaus) implies a smaller ensemble of buildings within a more agricultural setting, usually owned by lower-ranking landed gentry whereas Schloss describes more representative and larger places. During the 18th century, some of these manor houses became local centers of culture where the local gentry, sometimes inspired by what they had experienced during their grand tour, was mimicking the lifestyle of the higher nobility, creating lavish parks, art collections or showed an interest in science and research.

=== Netherlands ===
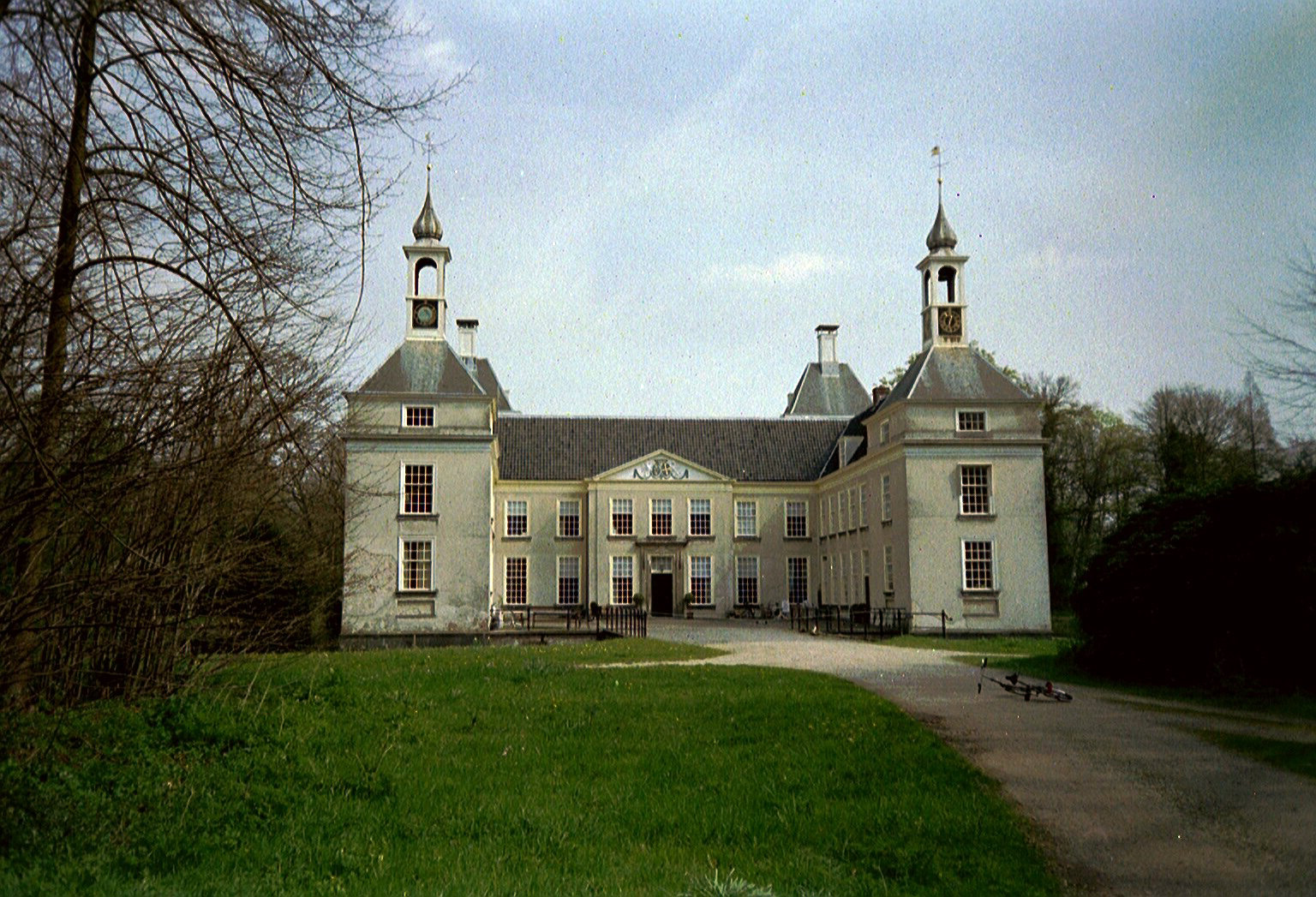
Warmond House (Huis te Warmond), the manor house for the Hoge Heerlijkheid of Warmond in the Netherlands

There are many historical manor houses throughout the Netherlands. Some have been converted into museums, hotels, conference centres, etc. Some are located on estates and in parks.

Many of the earlier houses are the legacy of the feudal heerlijkheid system. The Dutch had a manorial system centred on the local lord's demesne. In Middle Dutch this was called the vroonhof or vroenhoeve, a word derived from the Proto-Germanic word fraujaz, meaning "lord". This was also called a hof and the lord's house a hofstede. Other terms were used, including landhuis (or just huis), a ridderhofstad (Utrecht), a stins or state (Friesland), or a havezate (Drente, Overijssel and Gelderland). Some of these buildings were fortified. A number of castles associated with the nobility are found in the country. In Dutch, a building like this was called a kasteel, a slot, a burcht or (in Groningen) a borg.

During the Dutch Golden Age in the 17th century, merchants and regents looking for ways to spend their wealth bought country estates and built grand new homes, often just for summer use. Some purchased existing manor houses and castles from the nobility. Some country houses were built on top of the ruins of earlier castles that had been destroyed during the Dutch Revolt. The owners, aspiring to noble status, adopted the name of the earlier castle.

These country houses or stately homes (called buitenplaats or buitenhuis in Dutch) were located close to the city in picturesque areas with a clean water source. Wealthy families sent their children to the country in the summer because of the putrid canals and diseases in the city. A few still exist, especially along the river Vecht, the river Amstel, the Spaarne in Kennemerland, the river Vliet and in Wassenaar. Some are located near former lakes (now polders) like the Wijkermeer, Watergraafsmeer and the Beemster. In the 19th century, with improvements in water management, new regions came into fashion, such as the Utrecht Hill Ridge (Utrechtse Heuvelrug) and the area around Arnhem.

Today there is a tendency to group these grand buildings together in the category of "castles". There are many castles and buitenplaatsen in all twelve provinces. A larger-than-average home is today called a villa or a herenhuis, but despite the grand name this is not the same as a manor house.

=== Poland ===
The architectural form of the Polish manor house (Polish: dwór or dworek) evolved around the late Polish Renaissance period and continued until the Second World War, which, together with the communist takeover of Poland, spelled the end of the nobility in Poland. A 1944 decree nationalized most mansions as property of the nobles, but few were adapted to other purposes. Many slowly fell into ruin over the next few decades.

Poland inherited many German-style manor houses (Gutshäuser) after parts of eastern Germany were taken over by Poland after World War II.

=== Portugal ===
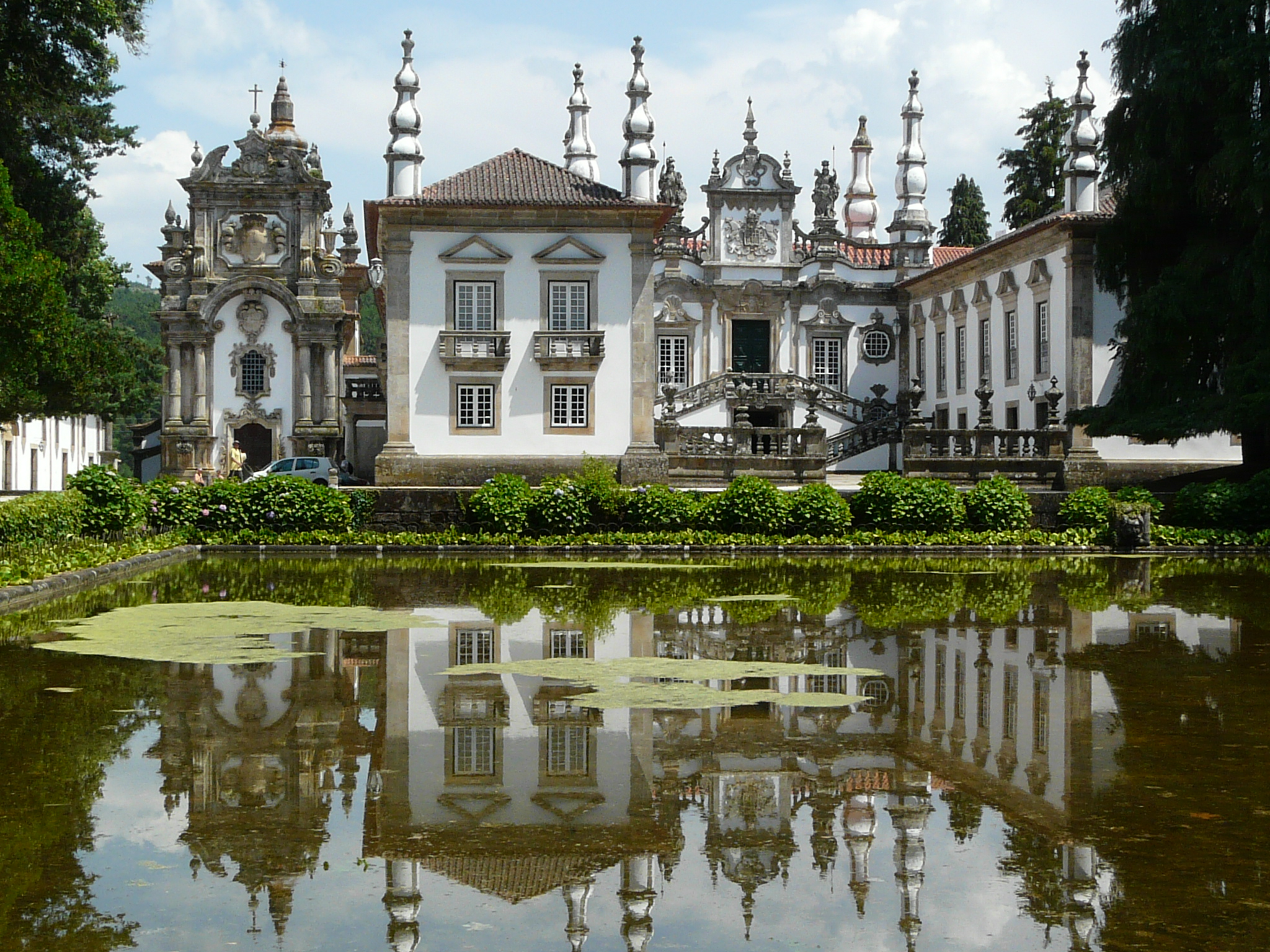
Solar de Mateus, Vila Real, Portugal

In Portugal, it was quite common during the 17th to early 20th centuries for the aristocracy to have country homes. These homes, known as solares (paços, when the manor was a certain stature or size; quintas, when the manor included a sum of land), were found particularly in the northern, usually richer, Portugal, in the Beira, Minho, and Trás-os-Montes provinces. Many have been converted into a type of hotel called pousada.

Quinta is a term used in the Portuguese language-speaking world, which is applied variously to manors homes or to estates as a whole.

=== Spain ===
Casa solariega is the catch-all name for manor houses in Spain. They were the places where heads of noble families resided. Those houses receive a different name depending on the geographical region of Spain where they are located, the noble rank of the owner family, the size of the house and/or the use that the family gave to them. In Spain many old manor houses, palaces, castles and grand homes have been converted into a Parador hotel.

A Palacio is a sumptuously decorated grand residence, especially a royal residence or the home of a head of state or some other high-ranking dignitary, such as a bishop or archbishop. The word itself is derived from the Latin name Palātium, for Palatine Hill, the hill which housed the Imperial residences in Rome. Palacio Real is the same as Palacio, but historically used (either now or in the past) by the Spanish royal family. Palacio arzobispal is the same as Palacio, but historically used by the ecclesiastic authorities (mainly bishops or archbishops).

Alcázar is a type of Moorish castle or fortified palace in Spain (and also Portugal) built during Muslim rule, although some founded by Christians. Mostly of the alcázars were built between the 8th and 15th centuries. Many cities in Spain have its alcázar. Palaces built in the Moorish style after the expulsion of the Moors from Spain are often referred to as alcazars as well.

Hacienda is landed estates of significant size located in the south of Spain (Andalusia). They were also very common in the former Spanish colonies. Some haciendas were plantations, mines or factories. Many haciendas combined these productive activities. They were developed as profit-making, economic enterprises linked to regional or international markets. The owner of an hacienda was termed an hacendado or patrón. The work force on haciendas varied, depending on the type of hacienda and where it was located.

Casona is old manor houses in León, Asturias and Cantabria (Spain) following the so-called "casa montañesa architecture". Most of them were built in the 17th and 18th centuries. Typologically they are halfway between rustic houses and palaces

Quinta is a countryside house closer to the urban core. Initially, "quinta" (fifth) designated the 1/5 part of the production that the lessee (called "quintero") paid to the lessor (owner of the land), but lately the term was applied to the whole property. This term is also very common in the former Spanish colonies.

Alqueria in Al-Andalus made reference to small rural communities that were located near cities (medinas). Since the 15th century it makes reference to a farmhouse, with an agricultural farm, typical of Levante and the southeastern Spanish, mainly in Granada and Valencia.

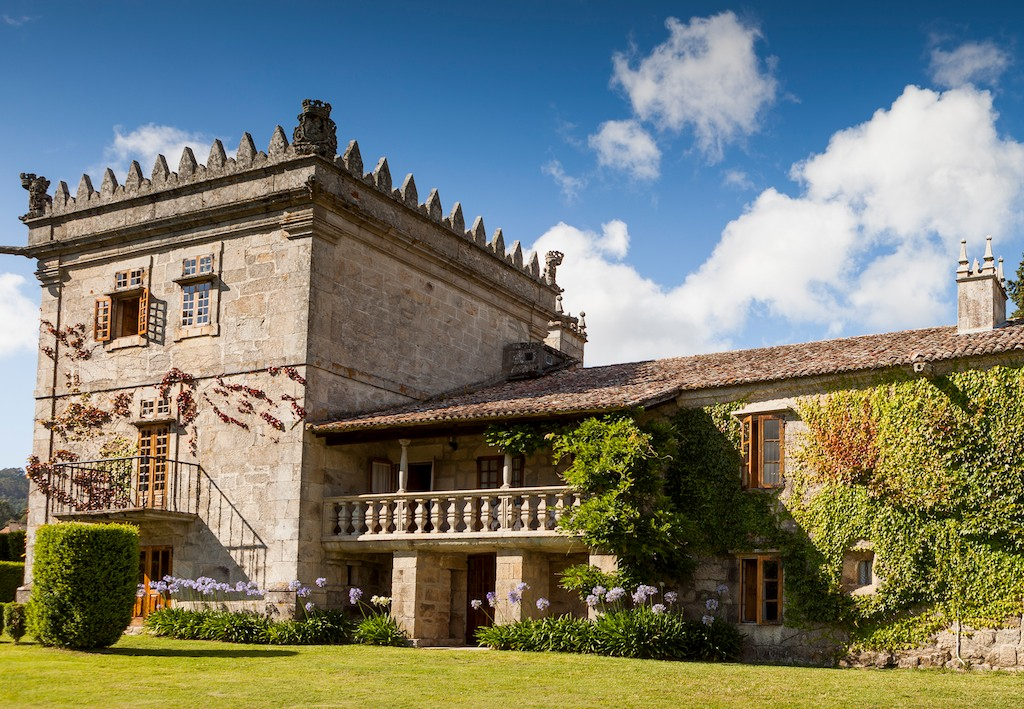
Pazo da Touza, Galicia

A pazo is a type of grand old house found in Galicia. A pazo is usually located in the countryside and the former residence of an important nobleman or other important individual. They were of crucial importance to the rural and monastic communities around them. The pazo was a traditional architectural structure associated with a community and social network. It usually consisted of a main building surrounded by gardens, a dovecote and outbuildings such as a small chapels for religious celebrations. The word pazo is derived from the Latin palatiu(m) ("palace").

The Baserri, called "Caserio" in Spanish, is the typical manor house of the Basque Provinces and Navarre. A baserri represents the core unit of traditional Basque society, as the ancestral home of a family. Traditionally, the household is administered by the etxekoandre (lady of the house) and the etxekojaun (master of the house), each with distinctly defined rights, roles and responsibilities. When the couple reaches a certain age upon which they wish to retire, the baserri is formally handed over to a child. Unusually, the parents were by tradition free to choose any child, male or female, firstborn or later born, to assume the role of etxekoandre or etxekojaun to ensure the child most suitable to the role would inherit the ancestral home. The baserri under traditional law (the fueros) cannot be divided or inherited by more than one person. This is still the case in the Southern Basque Country but the introduction of the Napoleonic Code in France, under which such practices are illegal, greatly upset this tradition in the North. Although the Basques in the north chose to be "creative" with the new laws, it overall resulted in the breakup and ultimate financial ruin of many baserris. In practice the tradition of not breaking up baserris meant that the remaining children had to marry into another baserri, stay on the family baserri as unmarried employees or make their own way in the world (Iglesia o mar o casa real, "Church or sea or royal house").

A cortijo is a type of traditional rural habitat in the Southern half of Spain, including all of Andalusia and parts of Extremadura and Castile-La Mancha. Cortijos may have their origins in ancient Roman villas, for the word is derived from the Latin cohorticulum, a diminutive of cohors, meaning 'courtyard'. They are often isolated structures associated with a large family farming or livestock operation in the vast and empty adjoining lands. It would usually include a large house, together with accessory buildings such as workers' quarters, sheds to house livestock, granaries, oil mills, barns and often a wall enclosing a courtyard. The master of the cortijo or "señorito" would usually live with his family in a two-story building, while the accessory structures were for the labourers and their families —also known as "cortijeros".

=== United States ===
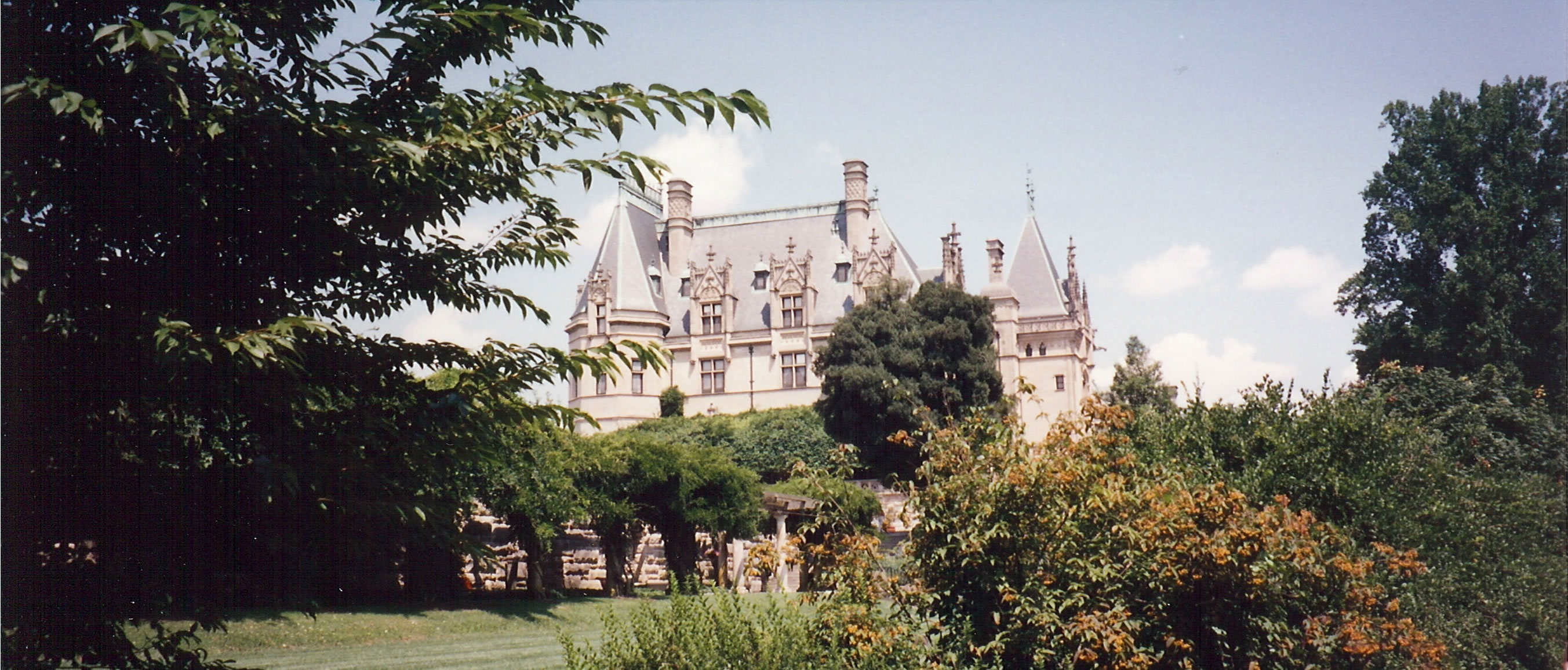
Biltmore Estate in North Carolina

Before the founding of the United States, colonial powers such as Britain, France and the Netherlands made land grants to favored individuals in the original colonies that evolved into large agricultural estates that resembled the manors familiar to Europeans. Founding fathers such as George Washington, Thomas Jefferson and James Madison were the owners of large agricultural estates granted by colonial rulers and built large manor houses from which these estates were managed (e.g., Mount Vernon, Monticello).

American agricultural estates, however, often relied on slaves rather than tenant farmers or serfs which were common in Europe at the time. The owners of American agricultural estates did not have noble titles and there was no legally recognized political structure based on an aristocratic, land-owning class. As a result, this limited the development of a feudal or manorial land-owning system to just a few regions such as Tidewater and Piedmont Virginia, the Carolina Low Country, the Mississippi Delta, and the Hudson River Valley in the early years of the republic.

Today, relics of early manorial life in the early United States are found in a few places such as the Eastern Shore of Maryland with examples such as Wye Hall and Hope House (Easton, Maryland), Virginia at Monticello and Westover Plantation, the Hudson River Valley of New York at Clermont State Historic Site or along the Mississippi such as Lansdowne (Natchez, Mississippi). Over time, these large estates were usually subdivided as they became economically unsustainable and are now a fraction of their historical extent. In the southern states, the demise of plantation slavery after the Civil War gave rise to a sharecropping agricultural economy that had similarities to European serfdom and lasted into the early 20th century. The Biltmore Estate in North Carolina (which is still owned by descendants of the original builder, a member of the Vanderbilt family) is a more modern, though unsuccessful, attempt at building a small manorial society near Asheville, North Carolina.

Most manor-style homes built since the Civil War were merely country retreats for wealthy industrialists in the late 19th and early 20th century and had little agricultural, administrative or political function. Examples of these homes include Castle Hill (Ipswich, Massachusetts), Vanderbilt Mansion National Historic Site and Hearst Castle. A rare example of hereditary estate ownership in the United States that includes a manor-type house is Gardiners Island, a private island that has been in the same family since the 17th century and contains a Georgian architecture house. Today, some historically and architecturally significant manor houses in the United States are museums. However, many still function as private residences, including many of the colonial-era manor houses found in Maryland and Virginia a few of which are still held within the original families.

Unlike in Europe, the United States did not create a native architectural style common to manor houses. A typical architectural style used for American manor-style homes in the mid-Atlantic region is Georgian architecture although a homegrown variant of Georgian did emerge in the late 1700s called Federal architecture. Other styles borrowed from Europe include Châteauesque with Biltmore Estate being an example, Tudor Revival architecture see Planting Fields Arboretum State Historic Park, and Neoclassical architecture with Monticello being a prominent example. In the Antebellum South, many plantation houses were built in Greek Revival architecture style.

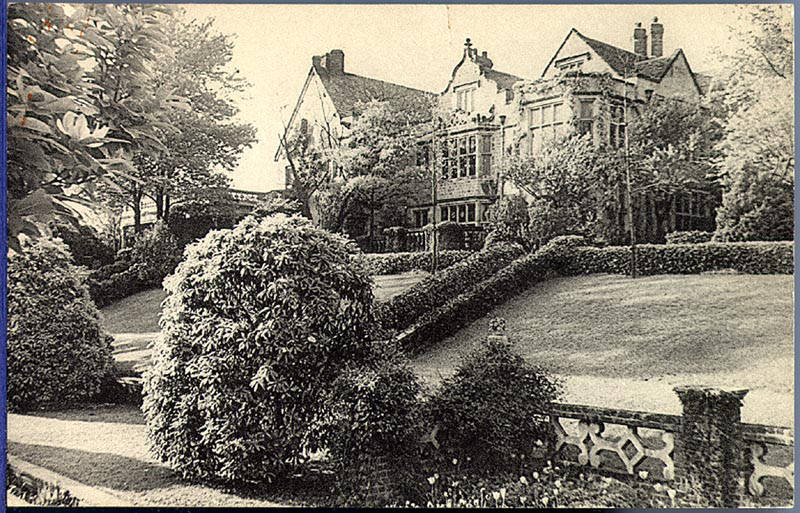
Virginia House, Garden Side (no title) (16835896132)

Virginia House is a former 16th-entury English manor house blending three romantic English Tudor designs. In 1925, it was relocated to Richmond, Virginia from main sections dating from the 1620 remodeling of a priory in Warwickshire, England and reconstructed on a hillside overlooking the James River in Windsor Farms. Virginia House is now owned and operated by the Virginia Historical Society. The almost eight acres of gardens and grounds on which Virginia House rests were designed by Charles Gillette. The house has been preserved and is largely as it was when the Weddells lived there. Virginia House is on the National Register of Historic Places listings in Richmond, Virginia.

== See also ==
- List of manor houses
- Ansitz
- Dovecote
- Hôtel particulier
- Manorialism
- Mansion
- Pele tower and bastle house
- Quadrangular castle
- Schloss, approximate German equivalent to a manor house
- Tower house
- Tower houses in Britain and Ireland
- Townhouse
- Villa
