= Sölvesborg =

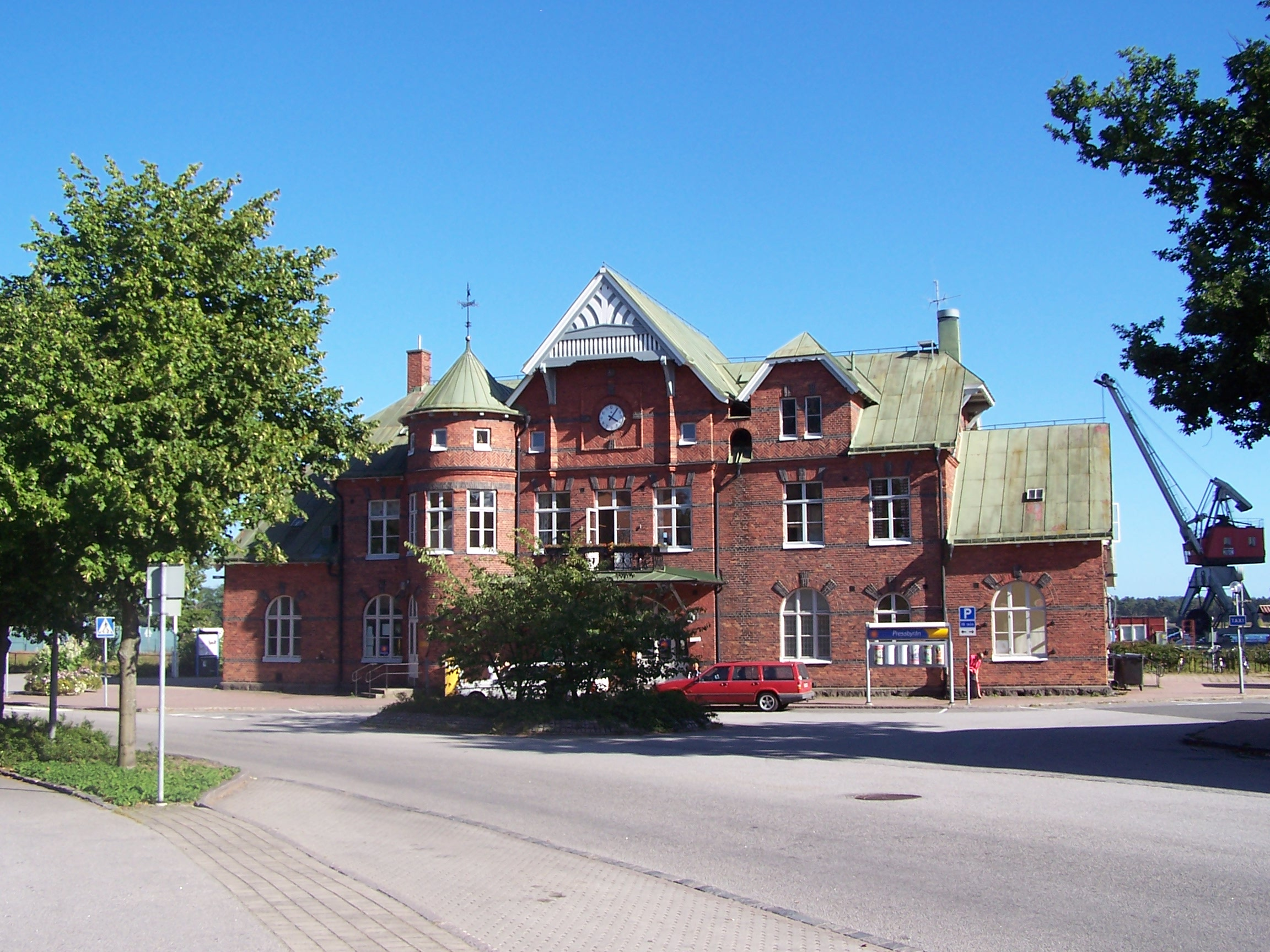
- Sölvesborg railway station

- Flag Coat of arms

- Location within Blekinge Location within Sweden
- Coordinates: 56°02′39″N 14°34′31″E
- Country: Sweden
- Province: Blekinge
- County: Blekinge County
- Municipality: Sölvesborg Municipality
- Charter: 1445

Area
  - Total: 6.10 km^{2} (2.36 sq mi)

Population (31 December 2010)
  - Total: 8,401
  - Density: 1,378/km^{2} (3,570/sq mi)
- Time zone: UTC+1 (CET)
  - Summer (DST): UTC+2 (CEST)

Sölvesborg is a locality and the seat of Sölvesborg Municipality in Blekinge County, Sweden with 10,024 inhabitants in 2013.

Sölvesborg is, despite its small population, for historical reasons normally still referred to as a city. Statistics Sweden, however, only counts localities with more than 10,000 inhabitants as cities.

== History of the city ==
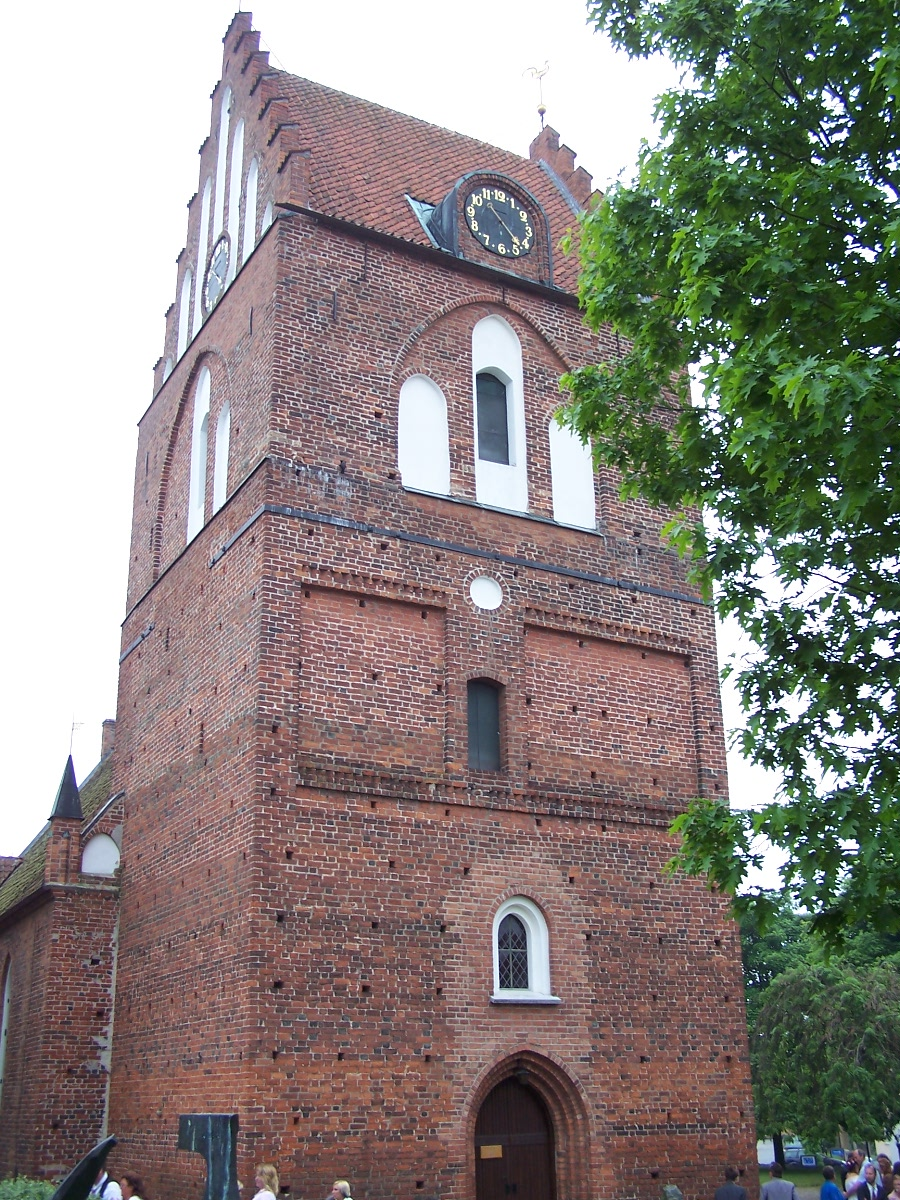
The Brick Gothic church dedicated to St. Nicholas is the main church of the city

As the water from the Baltic Ice Lake withdrew, the land around present-day Sölvesborg became accessible to settlers from what today is Denmark. The first people to settle were farmers; remains of their presence have been found in the area dating back to the Stone Age, mostly in the area around Gammalstorp, Siretorp and Istaby. The hill in the east, marking the border towards Karlshamn called Ryssberget, was a direct creation of the glacial movements. On the western side of the hill, the different times of ice withdrawal are clearly noticeable. The old, now drained lake of Vesan was also a product of the ice age.

The port town of Sölvesborg was founded in the 12th century, between the mountain Ryssberget and the bay to the east (Sölvesborgsviken), but the city itself has grown up around the church, the monastery and later on the castle. The oldest part of the church of Saint Nicholas is from the 12th century. In the 14th century, the church formed part of a Carmelite convent. In 1564 Sölvesborg took over the city charter of Elleholm.

At about the same time as the church was built, the castle took shape. The oldest part are slightly younger than the church, and although the earliest days are not well documented, it is supposed that it was originally merely a fortress. The castle came to be extended - both its height as well as the area it covered during the years.

The city was granted its charter in 1445 by the Scandinavian king Christopher of Bavaria.

The history of Sölvesborg is marked by its location on the main road connecting the then Danish districts of Skåne and Blekinge, therefore a fortress was built as Sölvesborg was the main city in the province of Sölvesborg (called Sölvesborgs län).

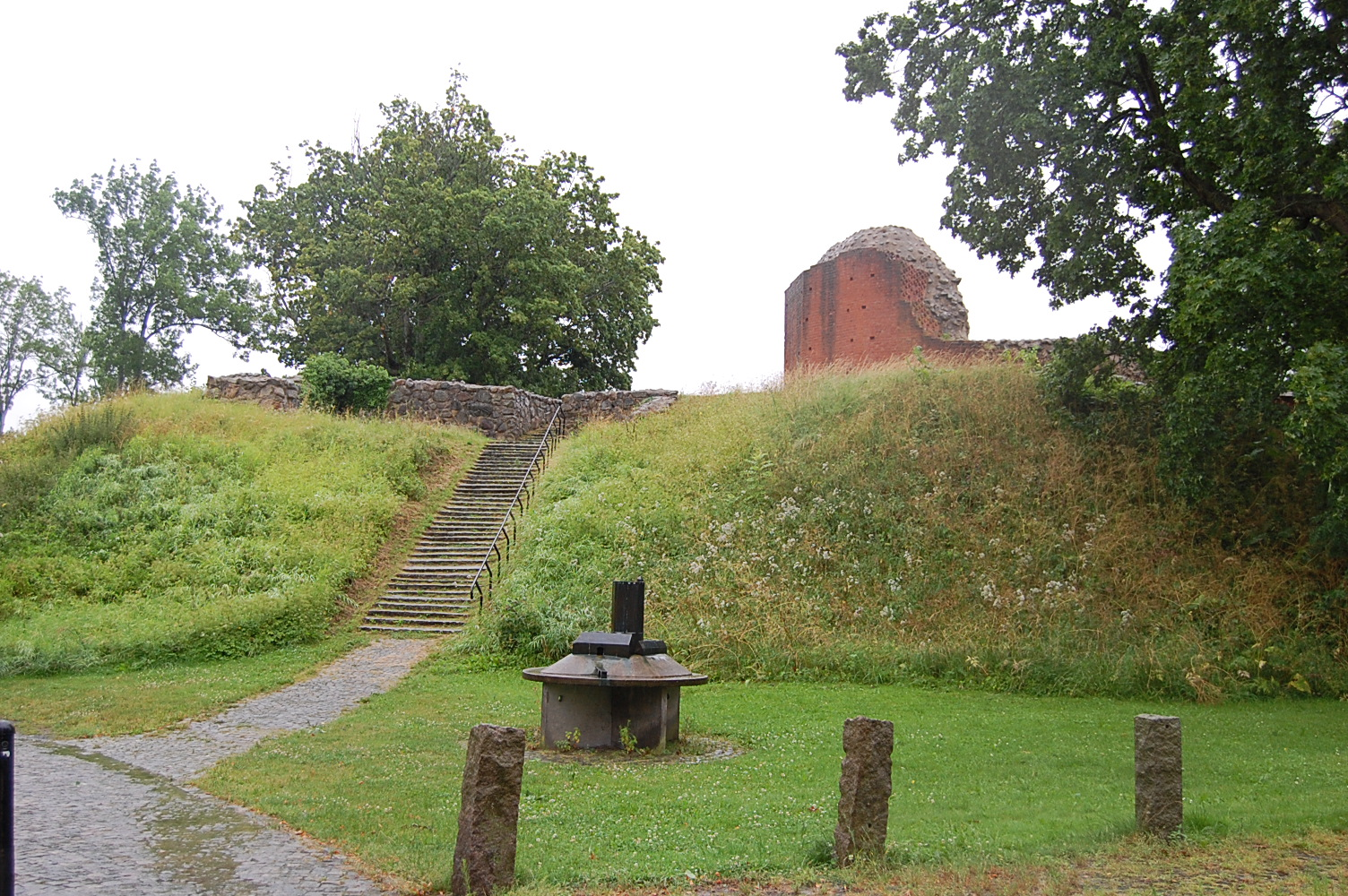
The medieval castle

The origin of the name Sölvesborg is unclear, but is believed to come from the founder of the castle, Sölfwitz or Sölvitz. The name thus means the castle (Borg) of Sölfwitz. Others claim that the mentioned Sölve might be the Norse Viking King Sölve or Salve. Sølv means silver in Danish.

During the Middle Ages and well into the 16th century, Sölvesborg marked a strategic city in the west, together with the easternmost city - Kristianopel. During its heyday, the city came to host many of the ruling Danes when they came to visit the town. One notable character to inherit the Sölvesborg castle, was Sören Norby, which he was granted after his leaving Sweden, as he had fallen out of favour with the Swedish king, Gustav Vasa.

With the Danish king Christian IV, change came to be. The old town west to Sölvesborg, Vä, was burnt down during the wars with Sweden and Christian wanted to replace it with a new one – Christianstad (the city of Christian). In order to accomplish this, the trade privileges for Vä and Sölvesborg were withdrawn and given to Kristianstad. The city thus became less important and subsequently fell behind. Some minor production, such as a Faience factory between 1773 and 1798 made no major impressions.

The castle was abandoned after the Danish defeat to the Swedes at the battle of Knäred in 1637. Rather than letting the Swedes seize the castle, the foreman of the castle decided that it should be burnt. Today, nothing but ruins remain, but the old castle in Bäckaskog is of the same age and of similar construction.

Defunct city privileges were only restored in 1841, by the Swedish king Carl XIV.

== Industries ==
In the 18th century, a porcelain factory was established in 1773 by Baron Erik Gabriel Sparre. The porcelain produced there is referred to as faience, and production was spread around Sweden. The factory remained for only a few decades and production was cancelled in 1790. In 1901, a glass factory was established. After a private initiative, and in order to provide the factory with sand, a train line was built to Olofström and Älmhult. The glass factory closed in 1982. A shipping dock was opened in 1892 and remained extant until 1982.

Today, little of the old, traditional industries remain. Instead, the city's prosperity relies on commuters, small scale industries, and tourism. Outside the city, the fishing industry, especially in the harbour towns of Djupekås, Hällevik and Nogersund provides significant employment. In Norje, chicken production is an important local industry. Neighbouring paper mills at Mörrum (Södra Cell) and Nymölla are notable.

== Transport and connections ==
Sölvesborg got its first railway connections in the late 19th century, firstly to Karlshamn and Kristianstad and later on extended to Karlskrona in the east. This today is the only remaining railway connection and is now connecting Karlskrona in the east with Malmö and Copenhagen in the west.

In 1910 the railway connections were extended to Listerlandet, the countryside surrounding Sölvesborg and connecting the town to the neighbouring municipality of Mjällby and ending in Hörvik. This railway continued to run up until the 1950s.

Private investments saw to it that a new railway was built between Sölvesborg and Älmhult (city of IKEA) (the Sölvesborg-Olofström-Elmhult-Järnväg and on this route the first and longest natural tunnel, and also the only railway tunnel in Scania, came to place of its time near Barnakälla. Today, only half of the railway remains and only industrial traffic between Olofström and Älmhult.

The major road connection is the E22 (E66 up until 1994). Between 1993 and 1999 Sölvesborg and Wolgast in Germany had hover boat traffic during the summer months (May to August).

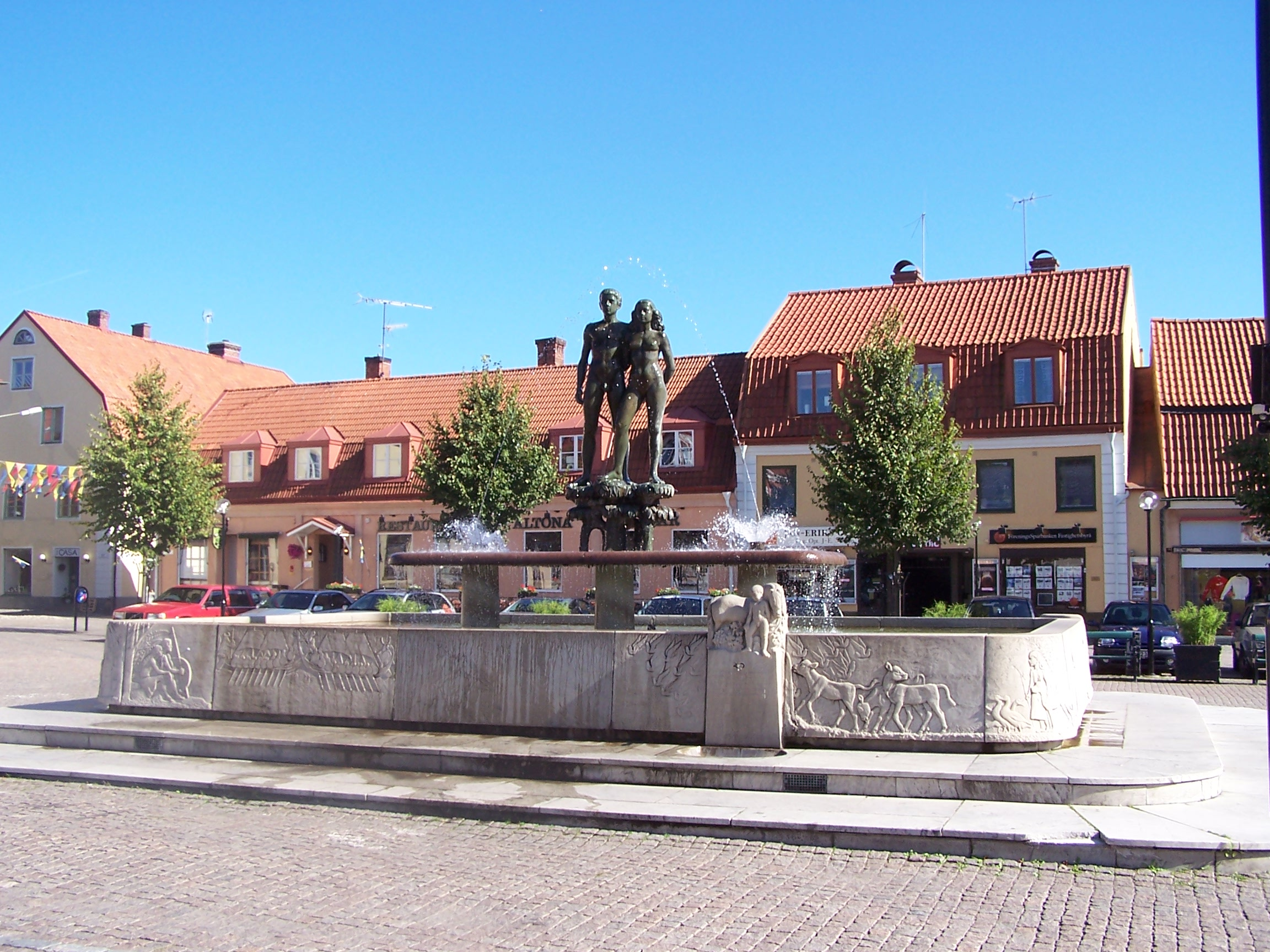
Image from Sölvesborg, a 1948 fountain of Ask and Embla, two characters of Norse mythology.

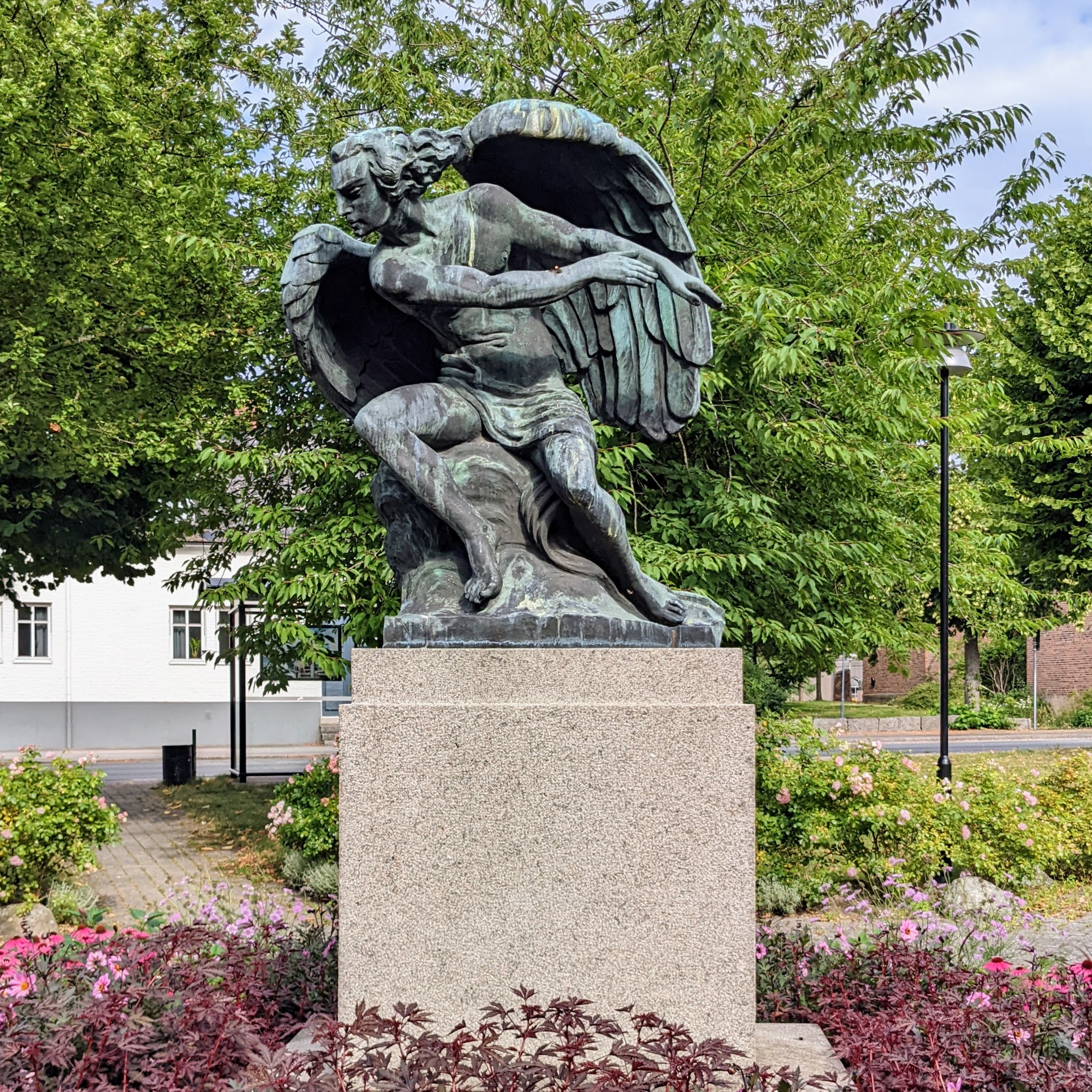
The monument Ariel by Alice Nordin (1926)

Sölvesborg still retains its street structure, unlike many other Swedish cities. Even after a near total fire in 1801, when the entire city except the church burnt down, it was decided to retain it instead of adapting a grid pattern.

== Sights ==
Apart from the aforementioned Ryssberget, the countryside villages outside of Sölvesborg are very scenic. In July, the village of Krokås hosts the day of eel fishing (Ålafiskets dag).

In central Sölvesborg, the twin hills of Kanehall and Vitehall, which up until the 18th century were lookout points, are located in the beech tree forest, one of Europe's largest coherent beech tree forest. Today, visitors need to go further upp Ryssberget to get the same view, as the trees have grown tall. Before reaching Kanehall and Vitehall, the houses on Norregatan should be passed. These houses reflect the old town and was, when the houses were built, an outskirt of the town referred to as the Fattigstaden or The Poor people's town. The town centre itself is a good example of the medieval town planning of Swedish and Danish towns.

Other notable visits include the Nicolai Church, whose oldest part stem from the 12th century and the runestones in and outside the church. The best preserved runestone is the stone located inside the church. The Museum and Gallery, located in the harbour in old warehouses are worth a visit. The museum reflects the history of the city, from the early settlements to the early 20th Century. The Gallery shows local artists mainly.

In 1985, SR International - Radio Sweden established a powerful medium-wave radio transmission facility at Sölvesborg. Broadcasting international programming to a large area of Europe, its twin antenna towers, located some 10 kilometres (6 miles) from the town of Sölvesborg itself, are notable local landmarks.

During the summer period, a visit to one of the many beaches is well worth. Notable beaches are Sandviken, Tredenborg and Hällevik.

Sölvesborg is the start of the Skåneleden's SL1 trail and its oldest section. The trail leads hikers from the town center up onto Ryssberget, where they can experience the tranquility of old-growth beech forests and panoramic views of Listerlandet.

== Sports ==
The following sports clubs are located in Sölvesborg:

- Mjällby AIF
- Hörvikens IF
- Sölvesborgs GoIF
- Lörby IF
