= Gammalstorp =

Place in Blekinge, Sweden

Coordinates: 56°06′20″N 14°37′10″E

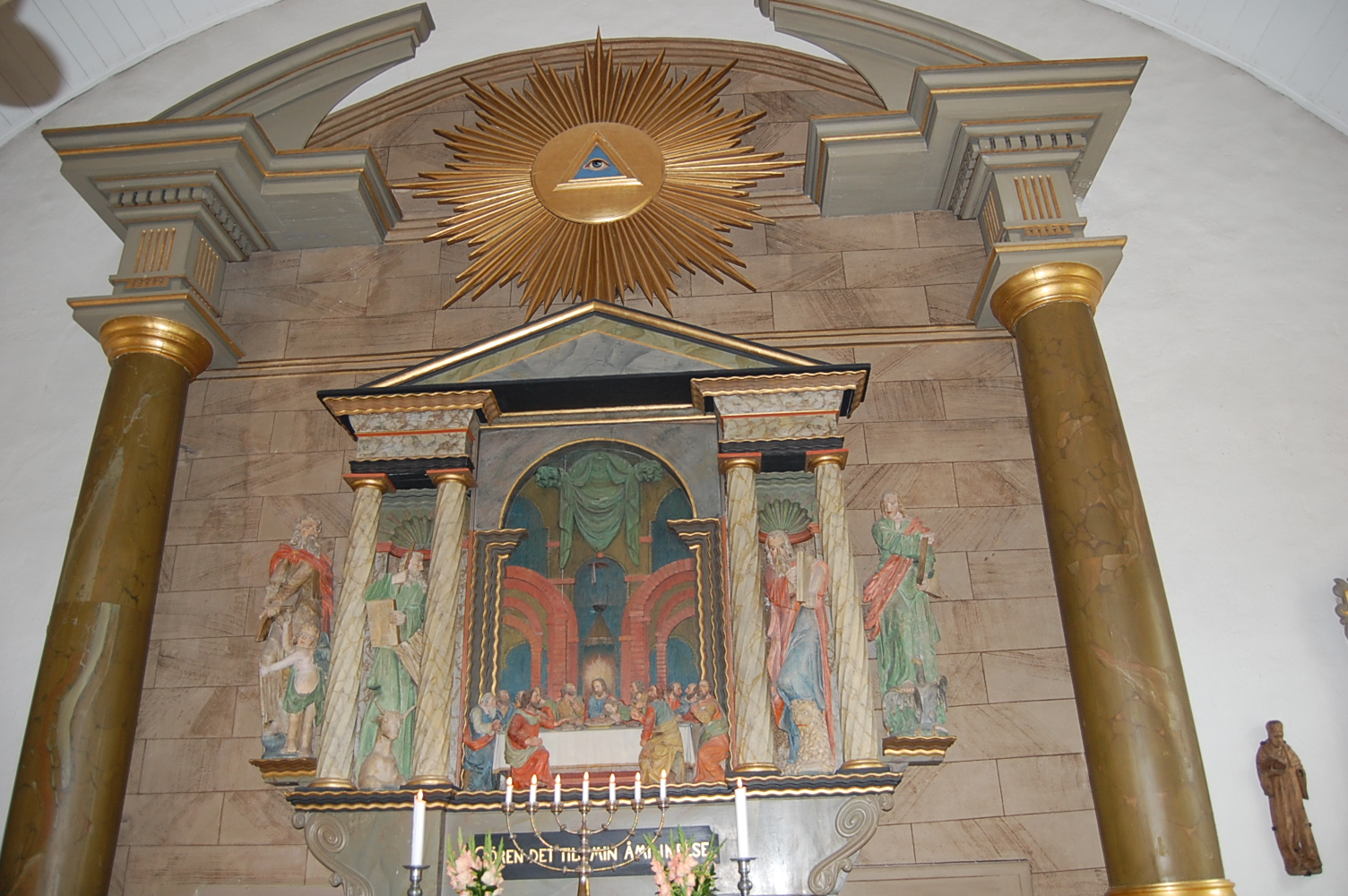
Altarpiece in the church.

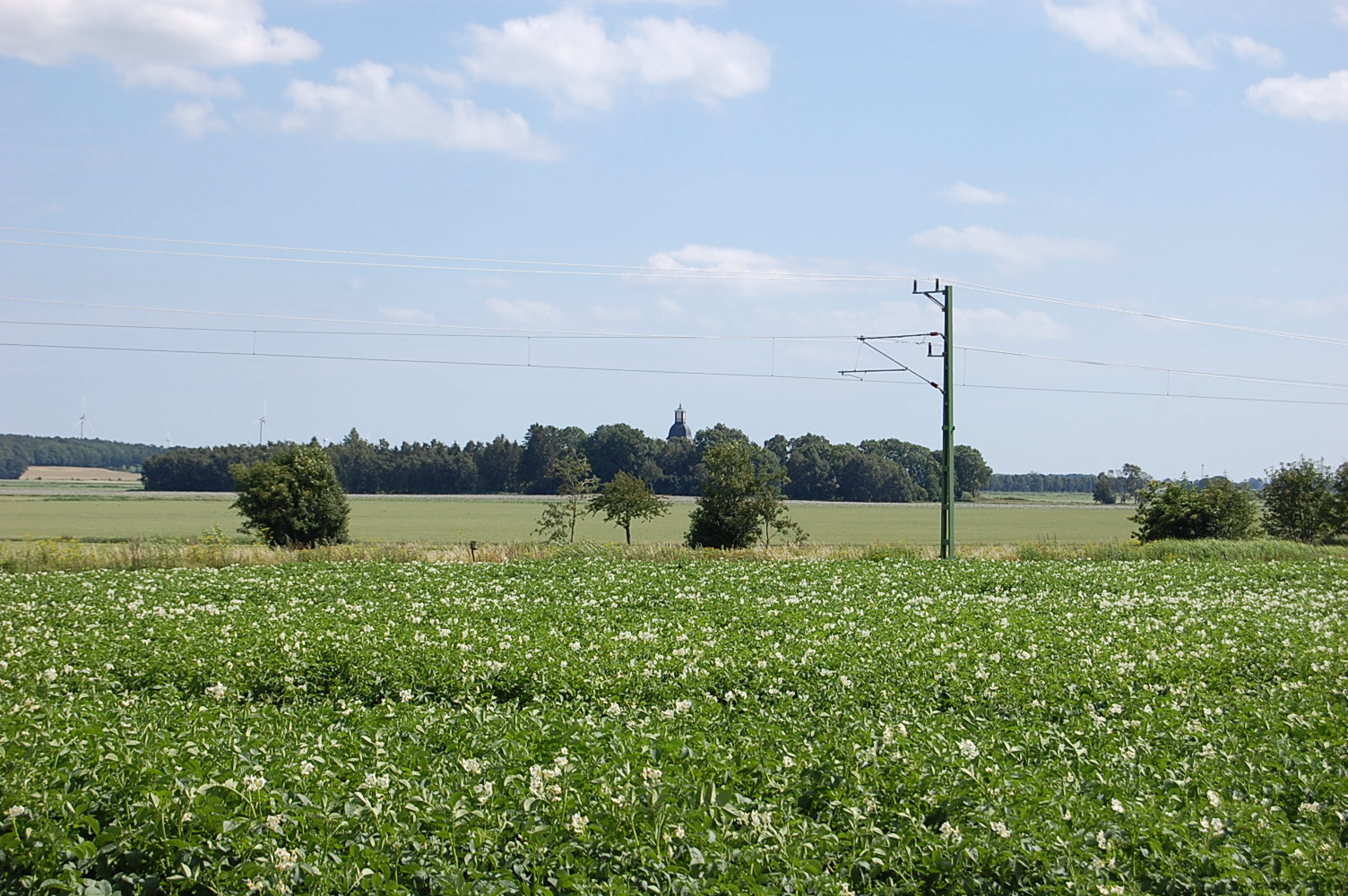
Vesan, the former lake.

Gammalstorp was a mining community in Sölvesborg Municipality, Blekinge, Sweden, between the years 1863 and 1970 CE. In contrast to other municipalities of the period (such as Mjällby), Gammalstorp did not have a particular administrative center. Instead, government functions were divided between the villages of Norje and Gammalstorp.

The village has grown up close to its church, originally located on an island in the former sound/lake of Vesan. Until the 1950s, the municipality had a number of distilleries
