= Nils Håkansson =

Swedish painter

Nils Håkansson (Latinized as Nicolaus Haquini) was a late medieval Swedish painter from Vadstena.

== Biography ==
Håkansson, known as Vittskövlemästaren, may have been the leader of a group of painters known as the Vittskövle group (Vittskövlemästaren). His time in the border areas between Blekinge and Scania was limited to about ten years. He is mostly known for wall paintings at Vittskövle Church, Gladsax Church and Ysane Church in Scania. Håkansson or his school also worked at Östra Eneby in Norrköping and at Strängnäs Cathedral.
