= Sölvesborg medium wave transmitter =

Transmitter station in Sweden

Coordinates: 55°59′28″N 14°40′01″E

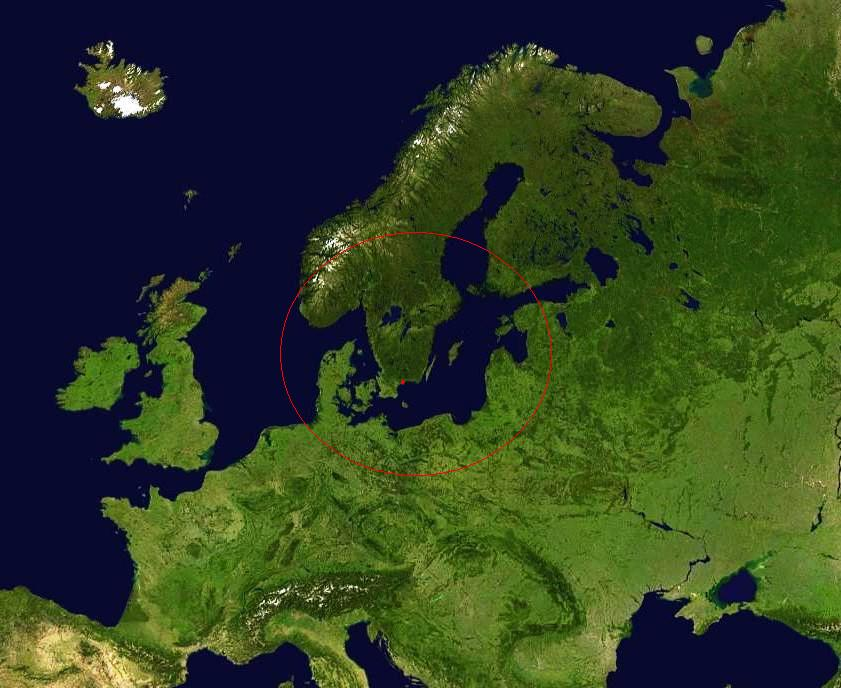
Daytime coverage - click the image to see better

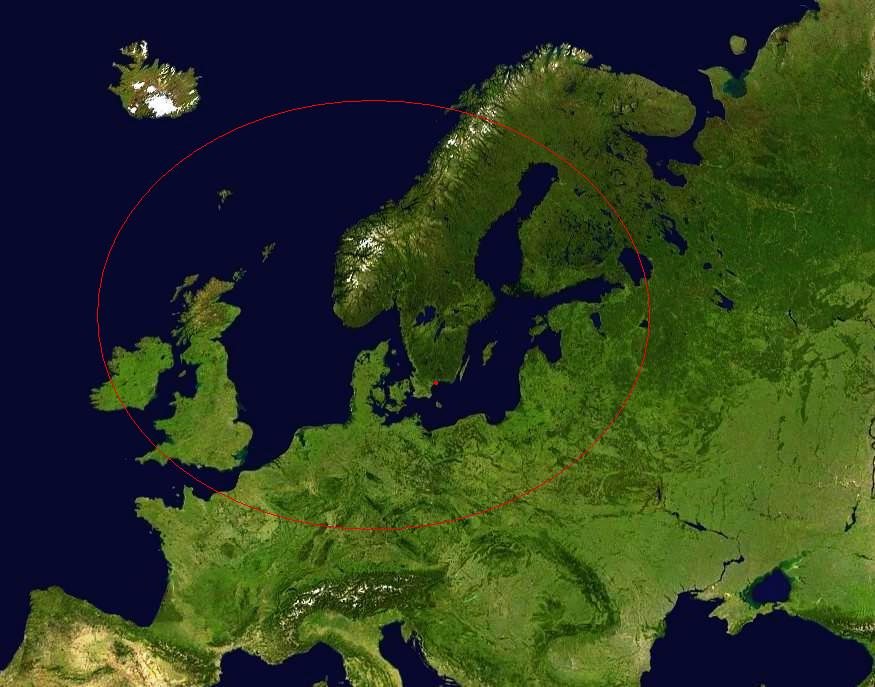
Nighttime coverage

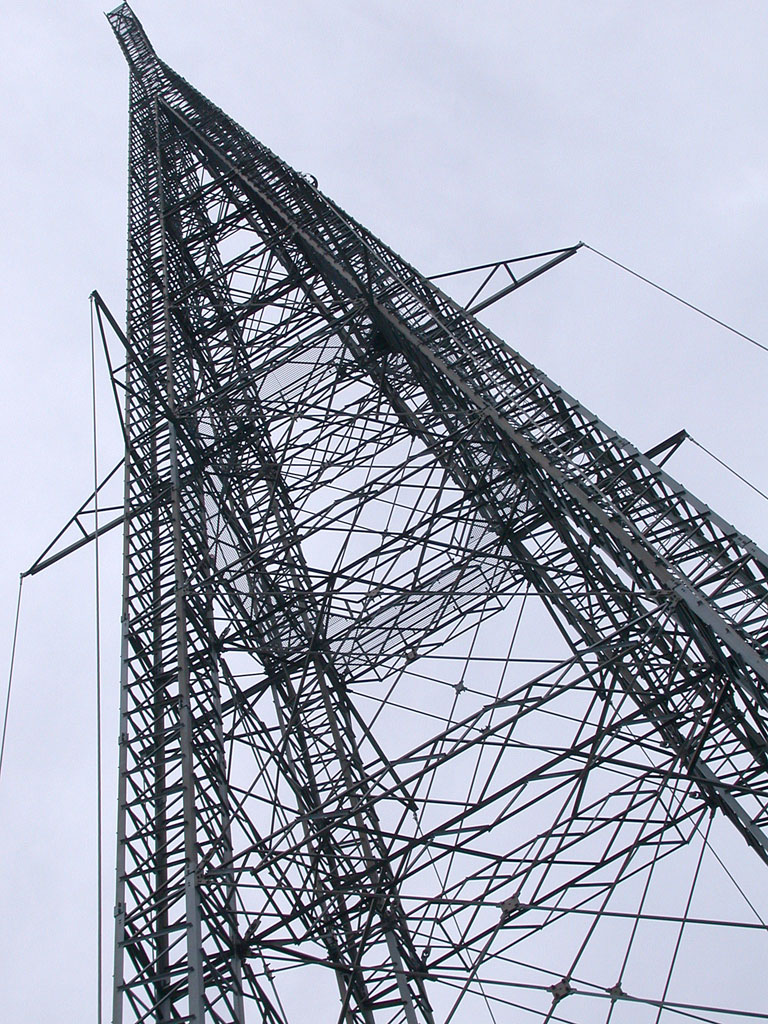
One of the steel lattice towers, Sölvesborg mediumwave station

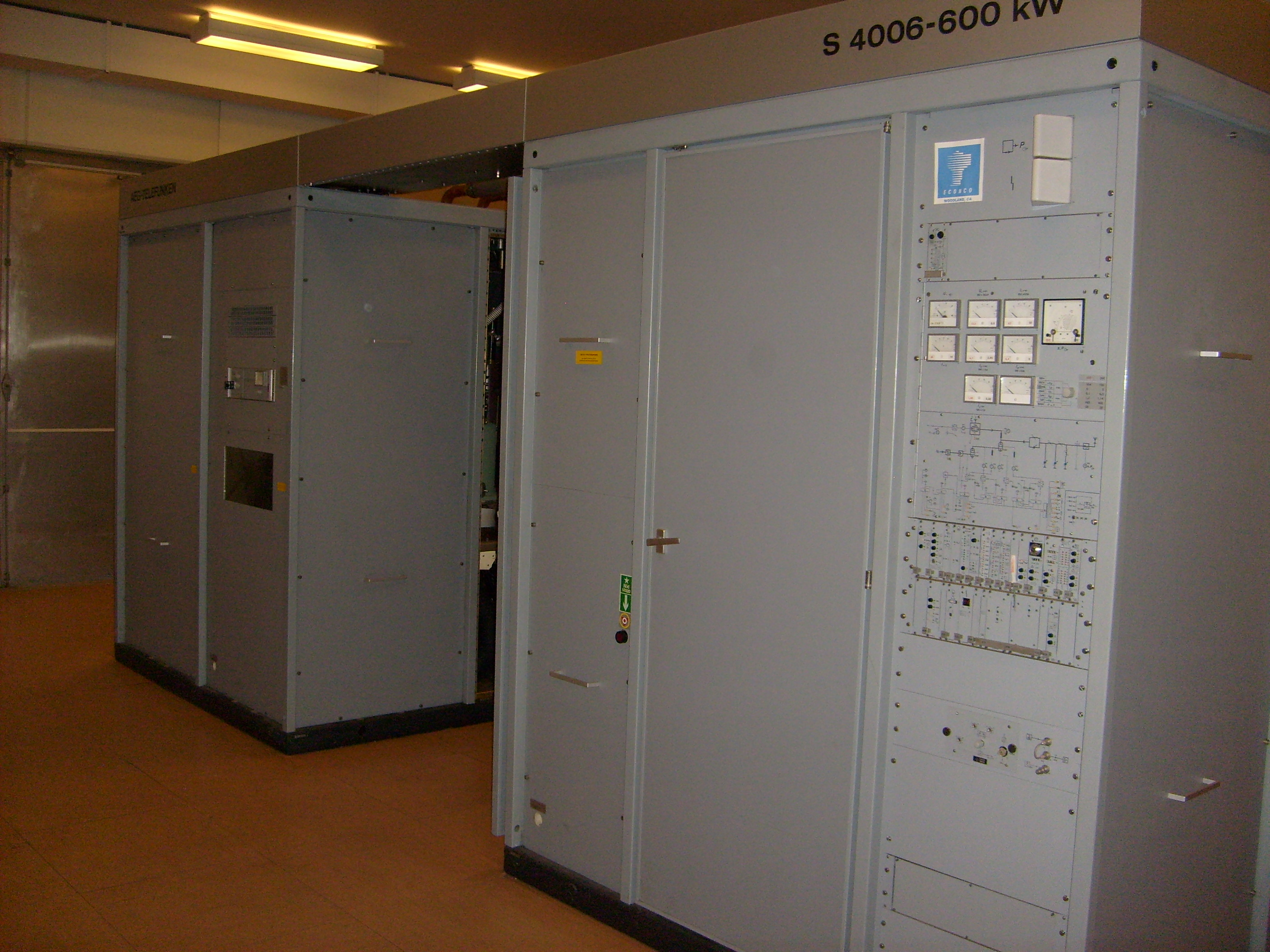
The transmitter Telefunken S4006 at Sölveborg mediumwave station

The Sölvesborg mediumwave transmitter (Swedish: Sölvesborg mellanvågsstation) is a radio station at Björkenabben on the peninsula Listerlandet, inaugurated 30 May 1985.

The station most recently transmitted on 1179 kHz, used by Radio Sweden International (until October 30, 2010), and is owned by Teracom.

== Technical specifications ==
The station is situated outside Sölvesborg, far out on the peninsula Listerlandet, right on its outer point Björkenabben at the seaboard of the Baltic Sea. The station takes advantage of a phenomenon called "sea gain", which means that the signal is amplified by the surrounding sea, to improve coverage. Two 135 metres (443 ft) high steel lattice towers work as antennas and are fed halfway up by eight feeders from a feeder house beneath each of the two antennas, where the feeders from the transmitter are connected.

The antenna currents are phase offset to achieve the directionality that has been decided by international law. One of the antennas is fed with 450 kW and the other one only with 150 kW. The station achieves most of its aiming towards west and north. It must be lowered towards east and south to not interfere with other stations on the same frequency. The station shares the frequency with five other stations in Europe. The transmission coverage area is directional the 70° and 270° azimuths.

The transmitter has a power of 600 kW (PEP) and, together with the antenna gain, the output power is 2000 kW (ERP). Prior to Sölvesbörg, a 100 kW site in Hörby had been in use since 1947, but its equipment had aged significantly. The staff prayed every morning for the old station to start. The Hörby transmitter was scrapped directly after Sölvesborg went into service.

On 14 January 1985, construction ended, and shortly after, adjustment began. On 30 May 1985, the station was inaugurated by Televerket Radio together with representatives from Sölvesborgs kommun and Sveriges Radio.

To save money, a 10 kW Marconi-transmitter was moved down from the closed mediumwave station in Sundsvall. It served Radio Sweden during daytime. In 1995 the transmitter went out of service with a loud bang (literally). After loss of power a fan stopped and the cooling for the tube and tube socket ceased. The tube socket melted down into the power supply. The transmitter was beyond repair.

== Construction works ==
Construction began in 1982. The antenna towers took three months to assemble. Smedjebacken-Boxholm made the drawings and Wibe assembled them. They weigh 70 tonnes each. In the ground around the towers, 8 km of copper wire were dug down which ends up in large copper plates to get optimal grounding. Two 350-metre-long feeder cables isolated by compressed air go from the station building to each of the antennas. The transmitter is a Telefunken S4006. Major parts of the transmitter are cooled by water with forced ventilation on some exposed parts. The efficiency lies around 73%, which is almost as high as theoretically possible.

It cost 25 million Swedish krona to construct the site. It features:

- 1500 tonnes of concrete
- 140 tonnes of steel
- 100 km of copper thread
- 20,000 man-hours of labor

The station building is prepared for one more transmitter.

== Present ==
The station is now (December 2011) silent but can be put into service after some maintenance. Teracom wants to demolish the station and sell it as scrap. Teracom don't see any future for the station. Some people have written to the County Administration Board in Blekinge about preserving the station as a listed building.
