= Åhus =

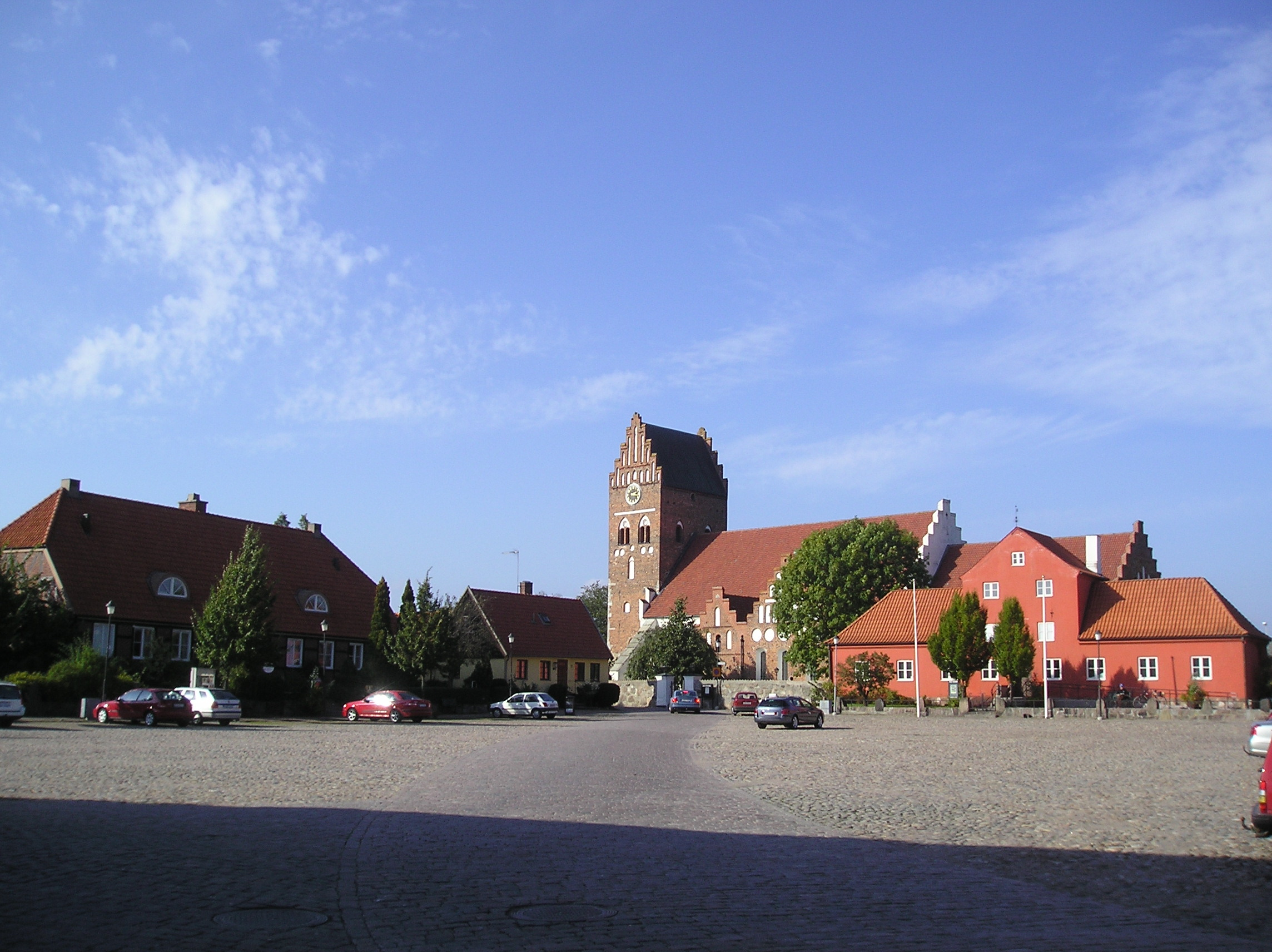
- Åhus, marketplace

- Location within Skåne Location within Sweden
- Coordinates: 55°55′N 14°17′E
- Country: Sweden
- Province: Skåne
- County: Skåne County
- Municipality: Kristianstad Municipality

Area
  - Total: 9.63 km^{2} (3.72 sq mi)

Population (31 December 2010)
  - Total: 9,423
  - Density: 978/km^{2} (2,530/sq mi)
- Time zone: UTC+1 (CET)
  - Summer (DST): UTC+2 (CEST)

Åhus (Swedish pronunciation: [ˈôːhʉːs]) is the second largest locality in Kristianstad Municipality, Skåne County, Sweden, with 9,840 inhabitants in 2015, but the number triples during the summer due to tourists who come seeking the beaches and nature of the Helgeå and Hanöbukten area. Åhus is also famous for hosting one of the largest beach handball tournaments in the world with approximately 20,000 participants. In 2011, in the village of Rinkaby near Åhus, the World Scout Meeting also known as the Jamboree was held.

== History ==
Åhus history dates back to the late Iron Age/Vendel Period, when a significant trading post was established some distance upstream of the modern settlement. In the 11th century, a castle was built outside the city following the continental model. The construction of the castle was long attributed to the Archbishop of Lund, Eskil, but findings of charcoal in an archaeological survey in 2010 suggest that it may be older than that.

Åhus was originally called Aos (1296). The name means 'estuary'. During the course of the 14th century, the spelling was gradually changed to Åhus (Aahus 1330). Possibly this change may have taken place through Low German influence.

Built during the 12th century, one of the oldest buildings of Åhus is Sankta Maria kyrka (church of St. Mary).

The city was a significant trading post in the Danish kingdom. Åhus experienced its heyday as a city during the 13th to 15th centuries, when the city obeyed and benefited from Lund's diocese. Among other things, a wall was built around half the city and a dike with a moat around half. The ruins of the wall are the second best preserved remains of a medieval ring wall in present-day Sweden. The oldest known city rights are from 1326, but according to the town's own tradition, it is believed that it was founded in 1149, when Archbishop Eskil received it as a grant. An old town, Åhus gained its town privileges in 1149, but lost them in 1617 when Kristianstad was built, following the burning of Vä by Swedish king Gustav II Adolf during the Kalmar War, 1611–1613.

Åhus medieval town hall, which is mentioned in writing for the first time in 1431, is partly preserved in the building by the square that now houses the Åhus museum. Åhus lost much of its significance with the Reformation in the 16th century, a century when Swedish looting also hit hard and, among other things, turned the castle into the ruin in the port area where it still is today. The period of decline was completed with Åhus losing its city rights in 1617, when the fortress town of Kristianstad was founded by Christian IV. In 1658, Åhus came to Sweden through the Treaty of Roskilde.

Åhus has long been known as a seaside resort. Already at the end of the 19th century, the bathing trains on the Åhus line ran from Kristianstad to Åhus. On hot summer days, 4,000–5,000 people were able to get off in the current extension of Stubbagatan to wander around Täppetstranden.

The town is also centre for the famous Swedish Eel-parties ("ålagille"), where people come together during August and September to eat smoked eel and drink considerable amounts of schnapps, preferably ones like Absolut Vodka that is produced in the town. Absolut Vodka is produced in Åhus.

In 1950 an ice-cream factory was built in Åhus, Åhus Glass. The factory was bought by another company, and ice-cream is now made and sold under the name Ingman Glass. Today, the original owners of Åhus Glass have reopened under a new brand, Otto Glass, producing ice cream with the original Åhus Glass recipes — the company is famous for its chocolate-dipped waffle cones. Another ice cream factory in Skåne is Engelholms Glass.

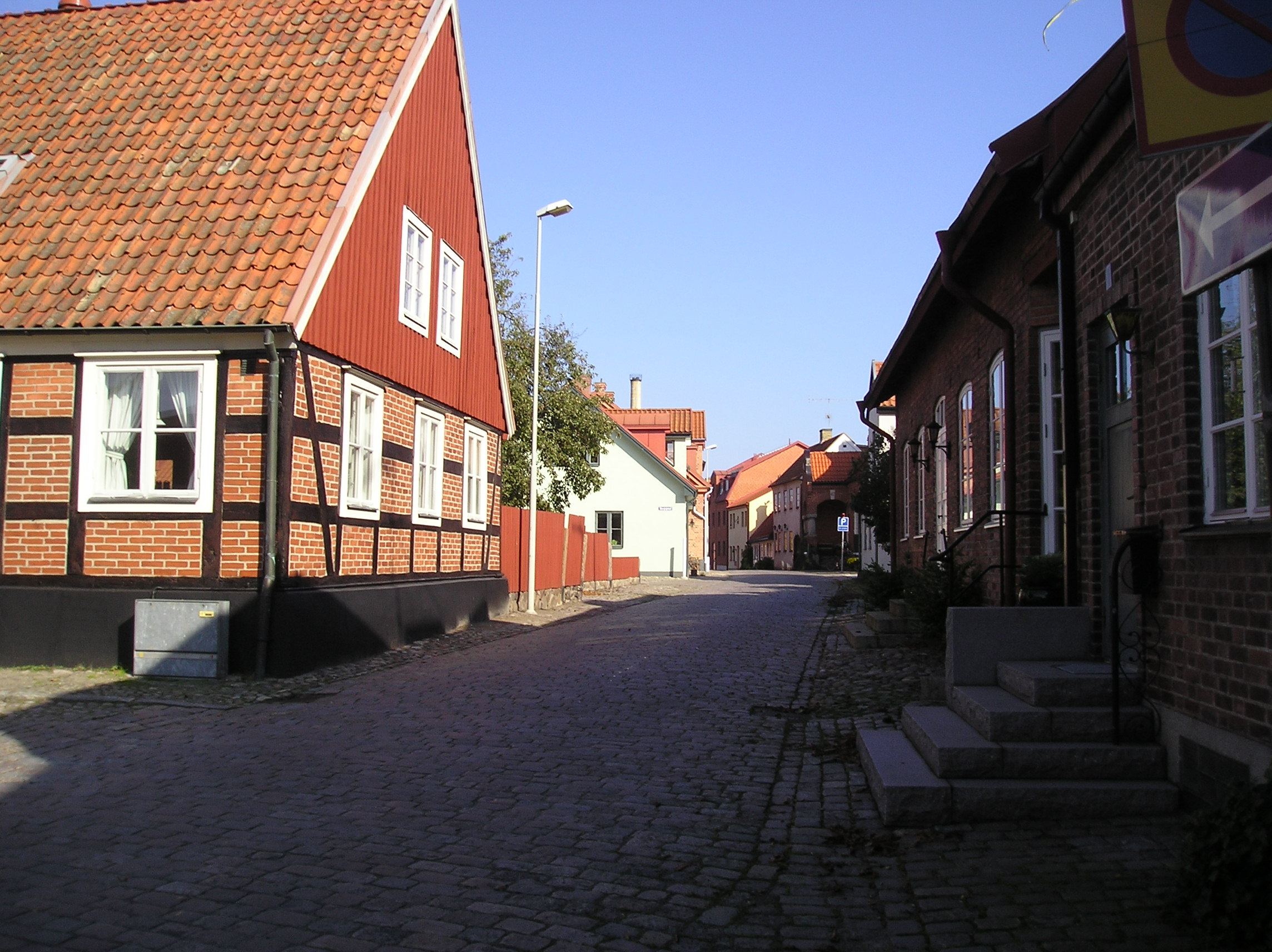
Houses in Åhus
