= Sölvesborg bridge =

Bridge in Sölvesborg, Sweden

Coordinates: 56.0506°N 14.5938°E

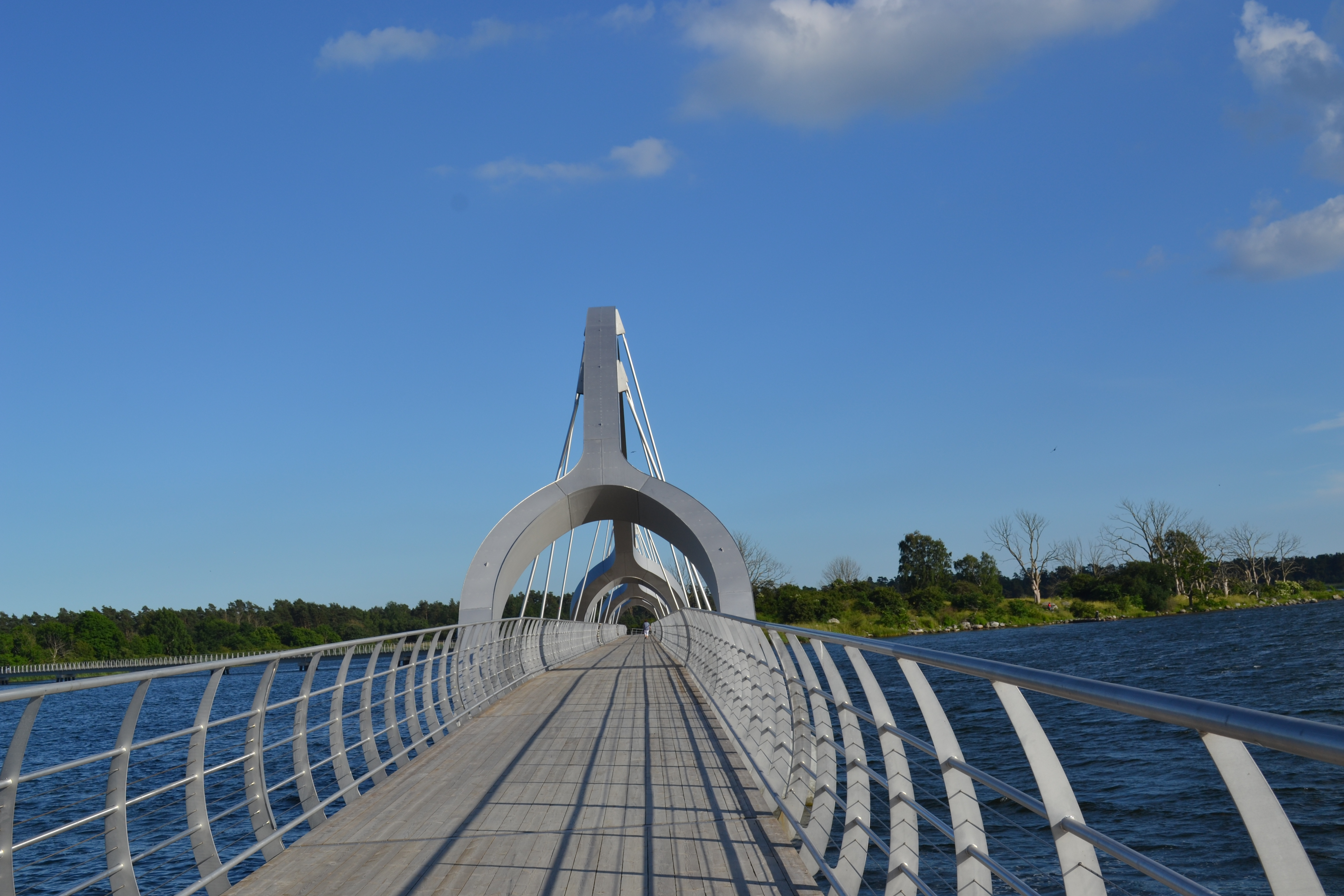
Walk- and bikebridge over the Sölvesborg Bay Area (2013)

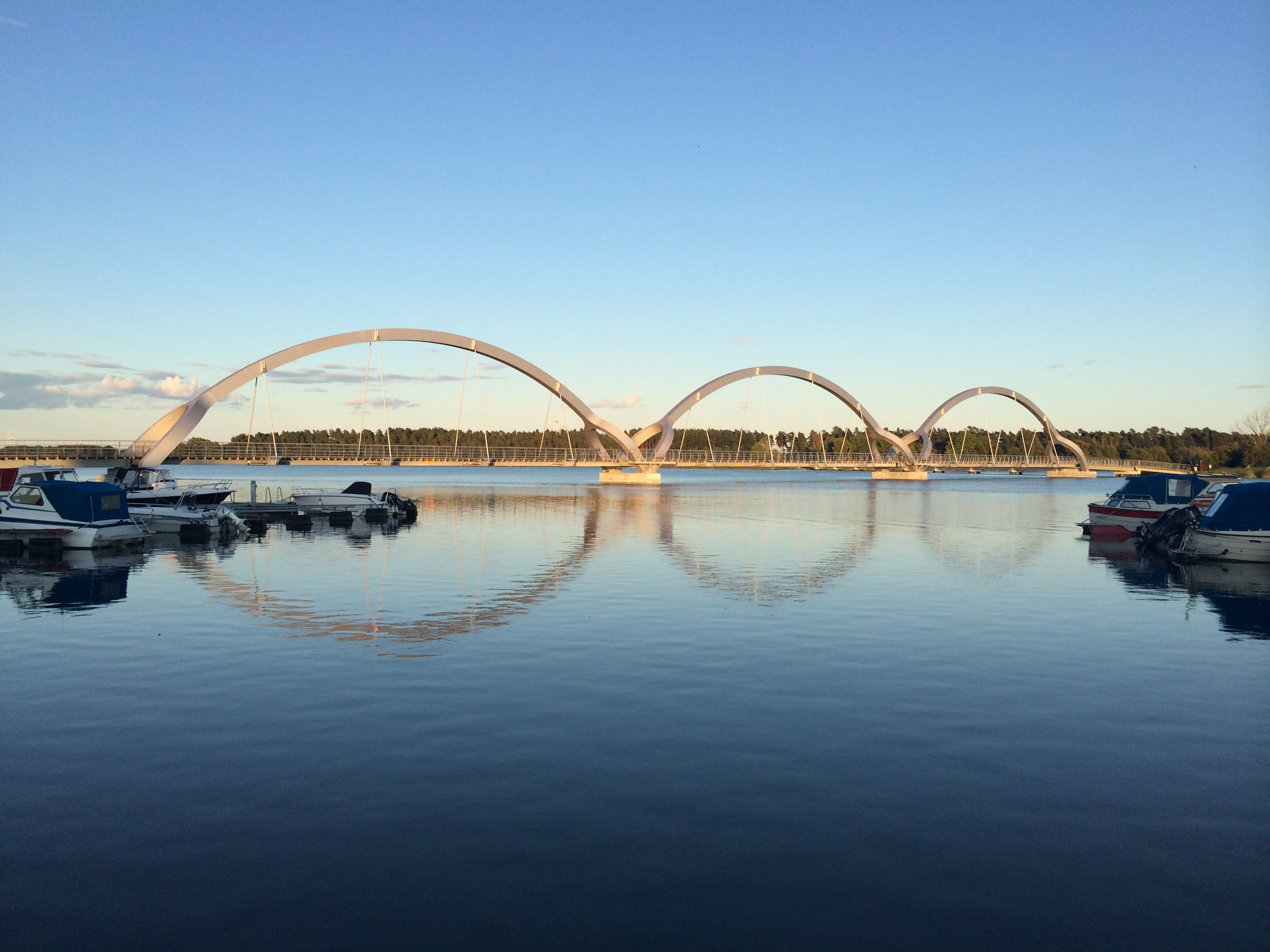
Bridge as seen from the Small boats Harbour in Sölvesborg

The Sölvesborg Bridge is a 760 meter long walk- and biking bridge over the Sölvesborg Bay Area in Blekinge. The bridge was officially opened on 25 May 2013.

The bridge was constructed by the local company Stål och Rörmontage.

In 2016, the bridge was named one of the eleven most spectacular bridges in the world by CNN.
