= Hanö =

Swedish Island

Coordinates: 56°00′30″N 14°50′45″E

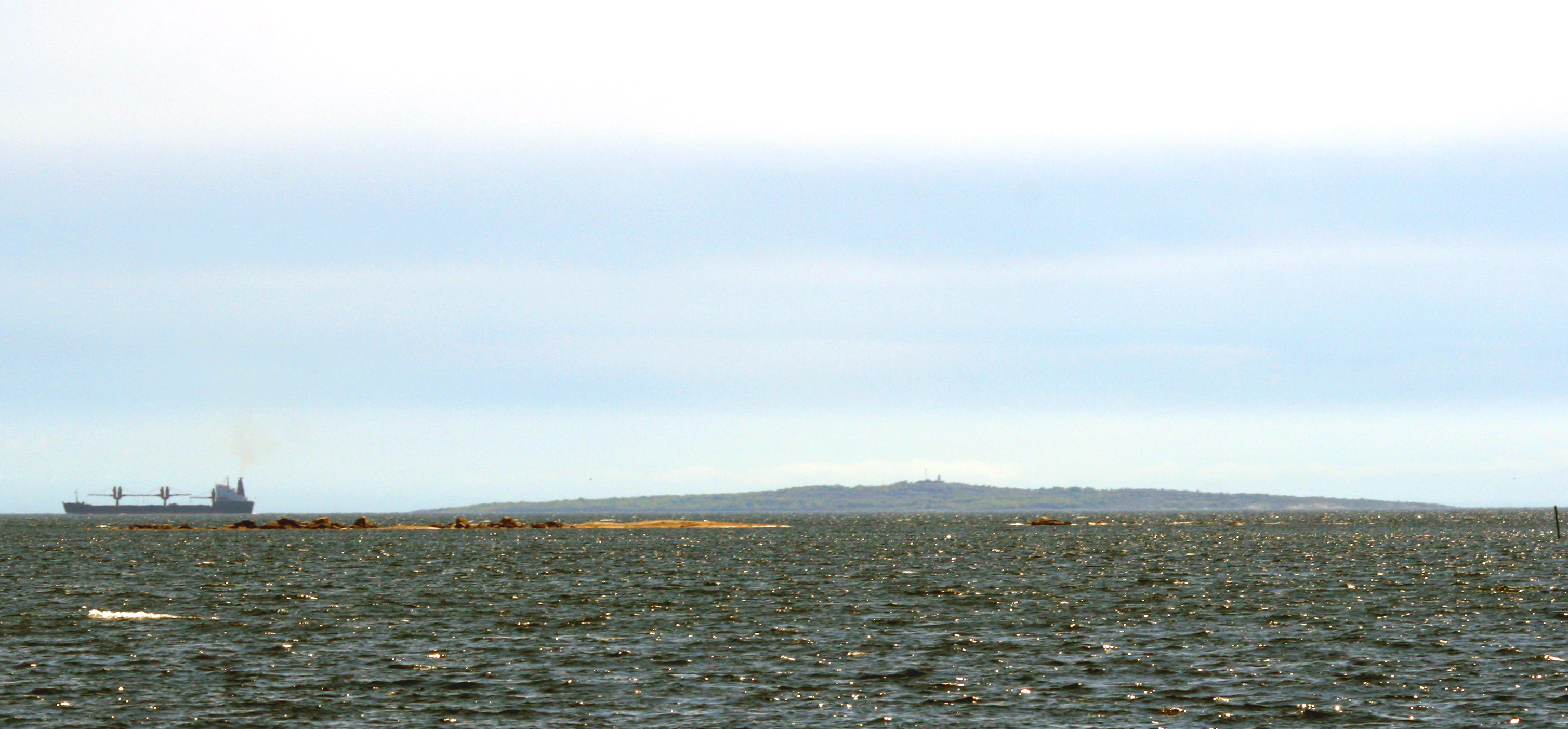
Hanö at the horizon, seen from the coast of Blekinge.

Hanö is an island off Listerlandet peninsula, western Blekinge, Sweden. From 1810 to 1812, during the Napoleonic Wars the Royal Navy of the United Kingdom used the island as its base during its operations in the Baltic Sea. The "English cemetery" is situated on the island, and still today British warships visit the island to pay tribute to the fifteen sailors who rest there. In 1972 the Royal Navy constructed a big wooden cross on the spot of the graveyard which is visible several miles out to sea.

== Climate ==
Hanö has an oceanic climate typical of southern Sweden, but with a narrower temperature range than the interior of Blekinge due to its exposed position to maritime winds.

Climate data for Hanö (2002–2018; extremes since 1941)
Month	Jan	Feb	Mar	Apr	May	Jun	Jul	Aug	Sep	Oct	Nov	Dec	Year
Record high °C (°F)	10.4 (50.7)	12.7 (54.9)	17.3 (63.1)	22.1 (71.8)	24.3 (75.7)	28.8 (83.8)	30.4 (86.7)	34.6 (94.3)	24.6 (76.3)	18.6 (65.5)	14.8 (58.6)	11.3 (52.3)	34.6 (94.3)
Mean maximum °C (°F)	6.6 (43.9)	6.6 (43.9)	11.0 (51.8)	15.3 (59.5)	20.6 (69.1)	24.2 (75.6)	26.0 (78.8)	24.7 (76.5)	20.7 (69.3)	15.6 (60.1)	11.4 (52.5)	8.1 (46.6)	27.1 (80.8)
Mean daily maximum °C (°F)	2.2 (36.0)	2.1 (35.8)	4.9 (40.8)	9.4 (48.9)	14.2 (57.6)	18.2 (64.8)	20.9 (69.6)	20.4 (68.7)	16.6 (61.9)	11.3 (52.3)	7.2 (45.0)	4.2 (39.6)	11.0 (51.8)
Daily mean °C (°F)	0.7 (33.3)	0.5 (32.9)	2.6 (36.7)	6.4 (43.5)	11.1 (52.0)	15.0 (59.0)	17.8 (64.0)	17.6 (63.7)	14.1 (57.4)	9.4 (48.9)	5.7 (42.3)	2.7 (36.9)	8.6 (47.5)
Mean daily minimum °C (°F)	−0.9 (30.4)	−1.1 (30.0)	0.0 (32.0)	3.4 (38.1)	8.0 (46.4)	11.7 (53.1)	14.6 (58.3)	14.7 (58.5)	11.5 (52.7)	7.4 (45.3)	4.2 (39.6)	1.1 (34.0)	6.2 (43.2)
Mean minimum °C (°F)	−7.5 (18.5)	−6.4 (20.5)	−4.5 (23.9)	−0.4 (31.3)	3.9 (39.0)	8.2 (46.8)	11.3 (52.3)	10.7 (51.3)	7.3 (45.1)	1.8 (35.2)	−1.7 (28.9)	−4.6 (23.7)	−8.9 (16.0)
Record low °C (°F)	−24.6 (−12.3)	−18.4 (−1.1)	−17.3 (0.9)	−5.7 (21.7)	−0.6 (30.9)	3.3 (37.9)	6.9 (44.4)	6.5 (43.7)	2.6 (36.7)	−2.8 (27.0)	−8.6 (16.5)	−12.2 (10.0)	−24.6 (−12.3)
Average precipitation mm (inches)	38.4 (1.51)	28.0 (1.10)	25.9 (1.02)	23.4 (0.92)	34.4 (1.35)	46.1 (1.81)	67.5 (2.66)	54.4 (2.14)	32.6 (1.28)	59.2 (2.33)	52.5 (2.07)	44.7 (1.76)	507.1 (19.95)
Source 1: SMHI Open Data
Source 2: SMHI Monthly Data 2002–2018
