= Vesan =

Former lake in Sölvesborg Municipality, Sweden

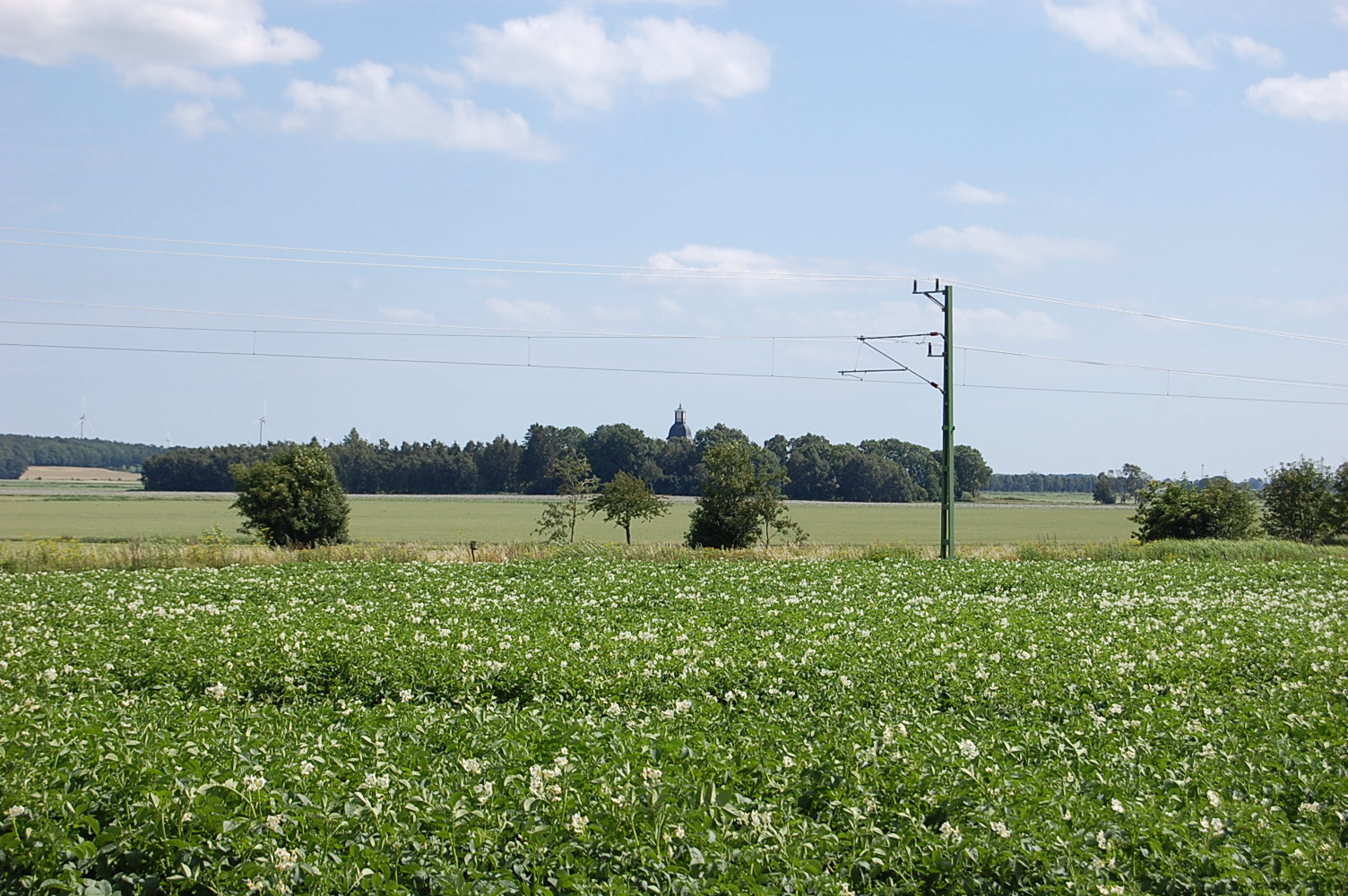
- The church of Gammalstorp seen on the former island in the former lake

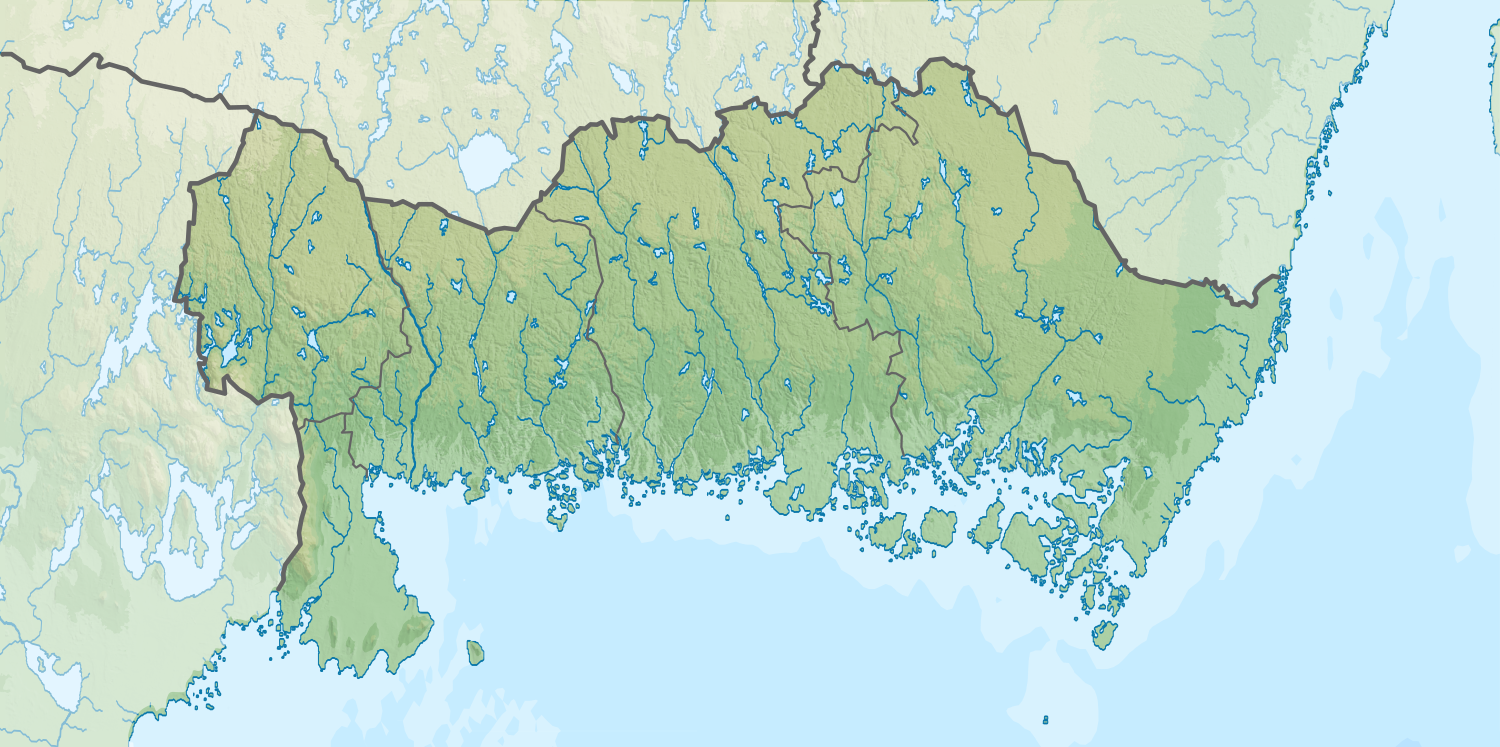
- Location within Blekinge Location within Sweden
- Location: Sölvesborg
- Coordinates: 56°06′18″N 14°38′26″E
- Primary outflows: 8 miljon cubic meters/year
- Basin countries: Sweden

Vesan is a former lake in Sölvesborg, Blekinge County, Sweden. Originally Vesan was a strait. In the area between Ryssberget and Listerlandet, water from Hanöbukten flowed in and in effect cut off Listerlandet from the rest of the mainland. The sound was open to sail through until the 18th century, but increased growth of reeds made the opening too narrow.

The area around Vesan contains the earliest evidence of human habitation in Blekinge, a small settlement dating to 9700 BC. Nowadays the former lake is farmland. The church of Gammalstorp lies on the small hill that formerly was an island.
