= Tredenborg =

Coordinates: 56°1′37″N 14°33′43″E

Tredenborg is a smaller locality with a population of 120 inhabitants in Sölvesborg Municipality, Blekinge County in southern Sweden.

Today, the area is populated mostly with summer cottages and a camping site. The locality had a ferry connection with Västra Näs, Sandviken and Sölvesborg until the mid-1950s, via Thors Brygga.
