= Lörby =

- Location within Blekinge Location within Sweden
- Coordinates: 56°04′N 14°42′E
- Country: Sweden
- Province: Blekinge
- County: Blekinge County
- Municipality: Sölvesborg Municipality

Area
  - Total: 0.74 km^{2} (0.29 sq mi)

Population (31 December 2010)
  - Total: 264
  - Density: 358/km^{2} (930/sq mi)
- Time zone: UTC+1 (CET)
  - Summer (DST): UTC+2 (CEST)

Lörby is a locality situated in Sölvesborg Municipality, Blekinge County, Sweden with 264 inhabitants in 2010.
