= Sandviken, Blekinge =

Coordinates: 56.017°N 14.600°E

Sandviken, together with the neighbouring town of Västra Näs, is one of the many minor communities and beaches of Sölvesborg in southeastern Sweden. Historically, this part of the Listerlandet was the first place to be inhabited, when the first settlers arrived to this part of Sweden in the Nordic Bronze Age, i.e., approximately 500. Finds from inhabitants here are at display at the museum of Sölvesborg. From here, the early settlers spread to other parts of the area, and Sandviken became a part of the surrounding farming settlements.

In the early 20th century, Västra Näs was mainly reached via a ferry service from Tredenborg, just outside the central city of Sölvesborg. The ferry traffic was partially industrial and partially for the benefit of people looking to go swimming on the beaches. Today, Sandviken and Västra Näs form a largely summer residential area with only a few permanent inhabitants.
