= Mjällby =

- Location within Blekinge Location within Sweden
- Coordinates: 56°03′N 14°41′E
- Country: Sweden
- Province: Blekinge
- County: Blekinge County
- Municipality: Sölvesborg Municipality

Area
  - Total: 1.67 km^{2} (0.64 sq mi)

Population (31 December 2010)
  - Total: 1,254
  - Density: 753/km^{2} (1,950/sq mi)
- Time zone: UTC+1 (CET)
  - Summer (DST): UTC+2 (CEST)

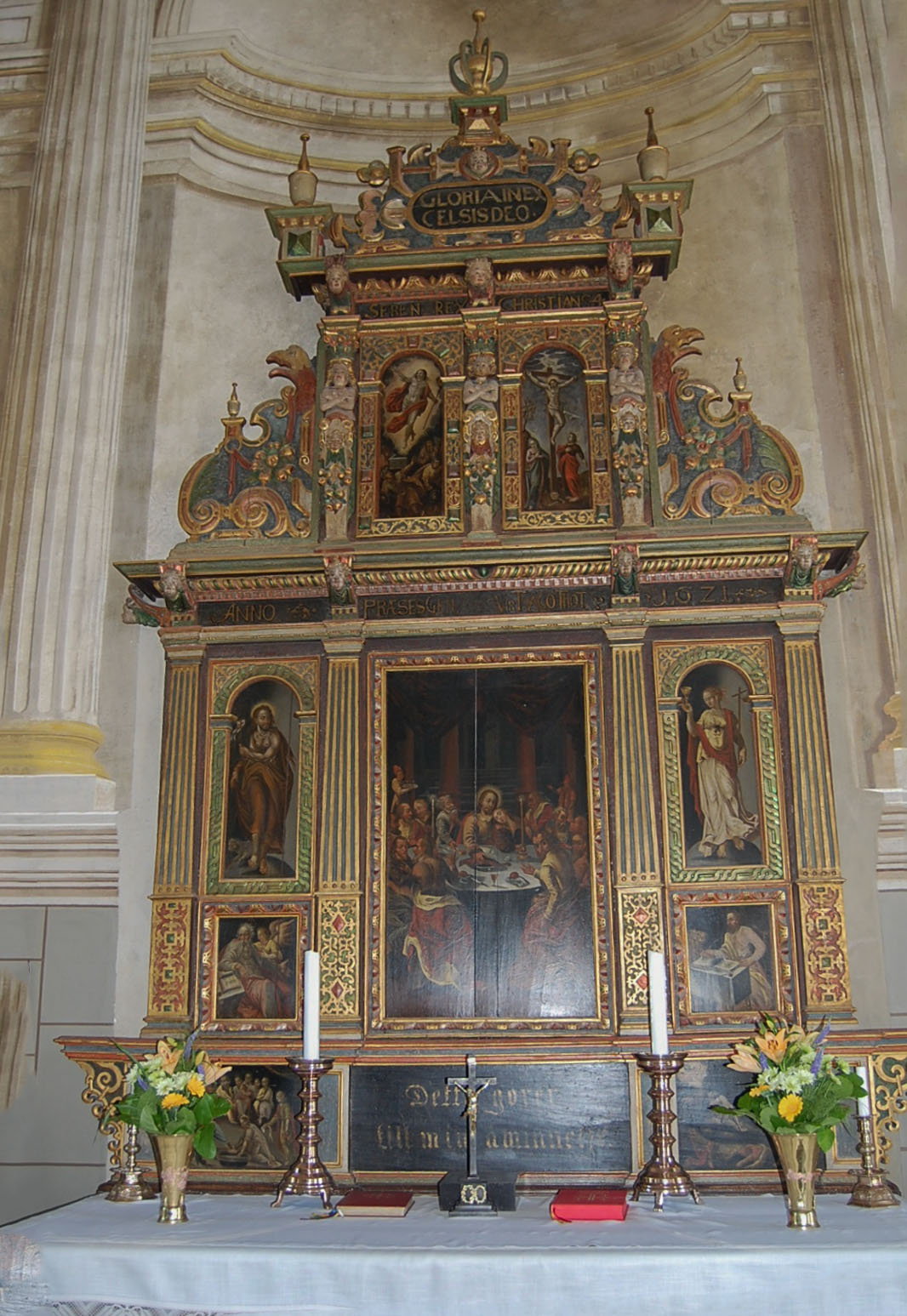
The altar inside the Mjällby Church.

Mjällby is a locality situated in Sölvesborg Municipality, Blekinge County, Sweden with 1,254 inhabitants in 2010. It is located on the Listerlandet peninsula.

The town has traditionally lived off fishing. The nearby harbour of Nogersund is the third largest fishery harbour in Sweden. The fishery industry is also dominant on the peninsula. Listerlandet is also the fur farming centre of Sweden. Fur farming is currently under heavy political debate in Sweden.

Mjällby is known for its football team which has played in the Swedish national football league a few times. Among football fans in Sweden the team of Mjällby AIF is known as "the team that always returns". In September 2009 the team qualified for the highest division and played five seasons in Allsvenskan before being relegated at the end of the 2014 season. On the 20th of October 2025, they secured their first ever first division league title.

The mathematician Lars Hörmander was born in Mjällby.

A suburb of the town built by a local housing company was unofficially known for around 40 years by locals as Negerby (Negro village) because of the black chimneys on the houses. In 2012, the use of this name was reported by a journalist. Following public outcry, the housing company decided to use the temporary name of Slottsstaden (Castle City).
