= Sölvesborgs län =

The administrative region of Sölvesborgs län, with the town of Sölvesborg as the capital, was formed in the late 14th century and lasted until the Danish king Christian IV decided on a new town - Kristianstad after the burning of the old town Vä.
