= Elleholm =

Coordinates: 56°9′48.16″N 14°45′2.33″E

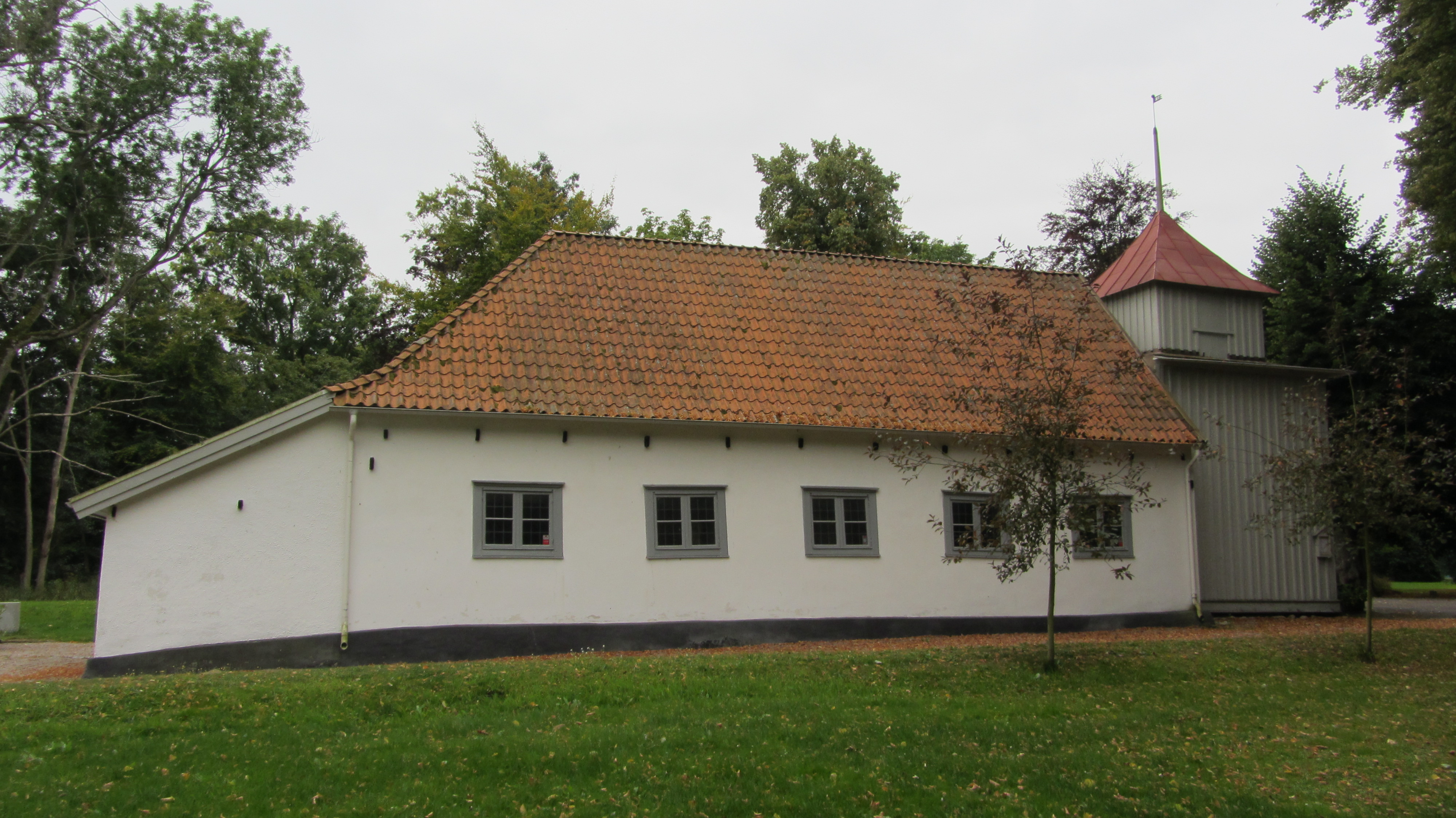
Church of Elleholm

Elleholm is a former town in Blekinge, Sweden. The town existed between 1450 and 1600, when it was abandoned.

The town was based around a former castle, called Sjöborg (meaning "Lake Castle") which today is a Hill fort.

The name "Elleholm" means "Isle of Alder", from old Danish.

== See also ==
- Elleholms house
