= Helge River =

River in Sweden

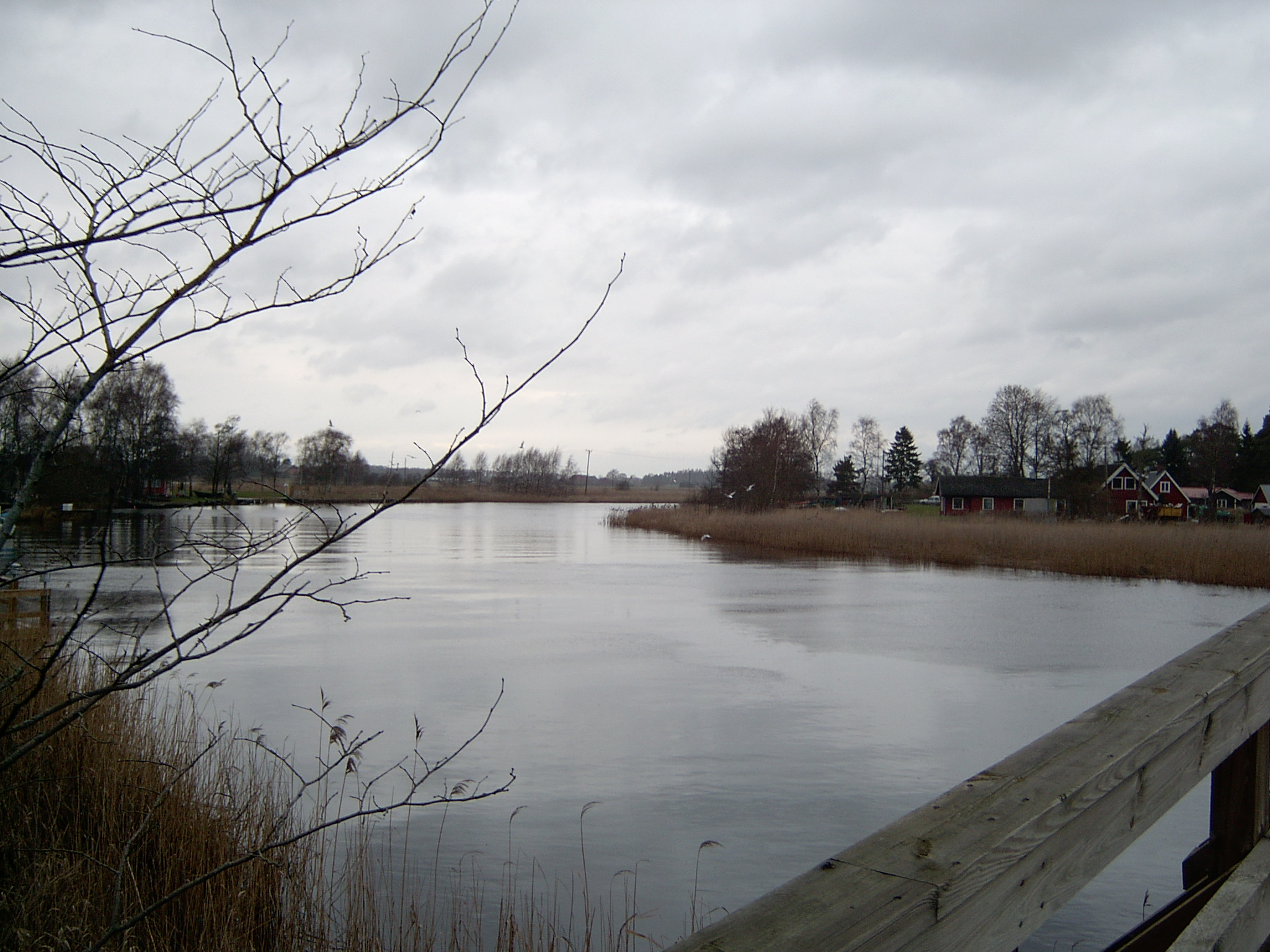

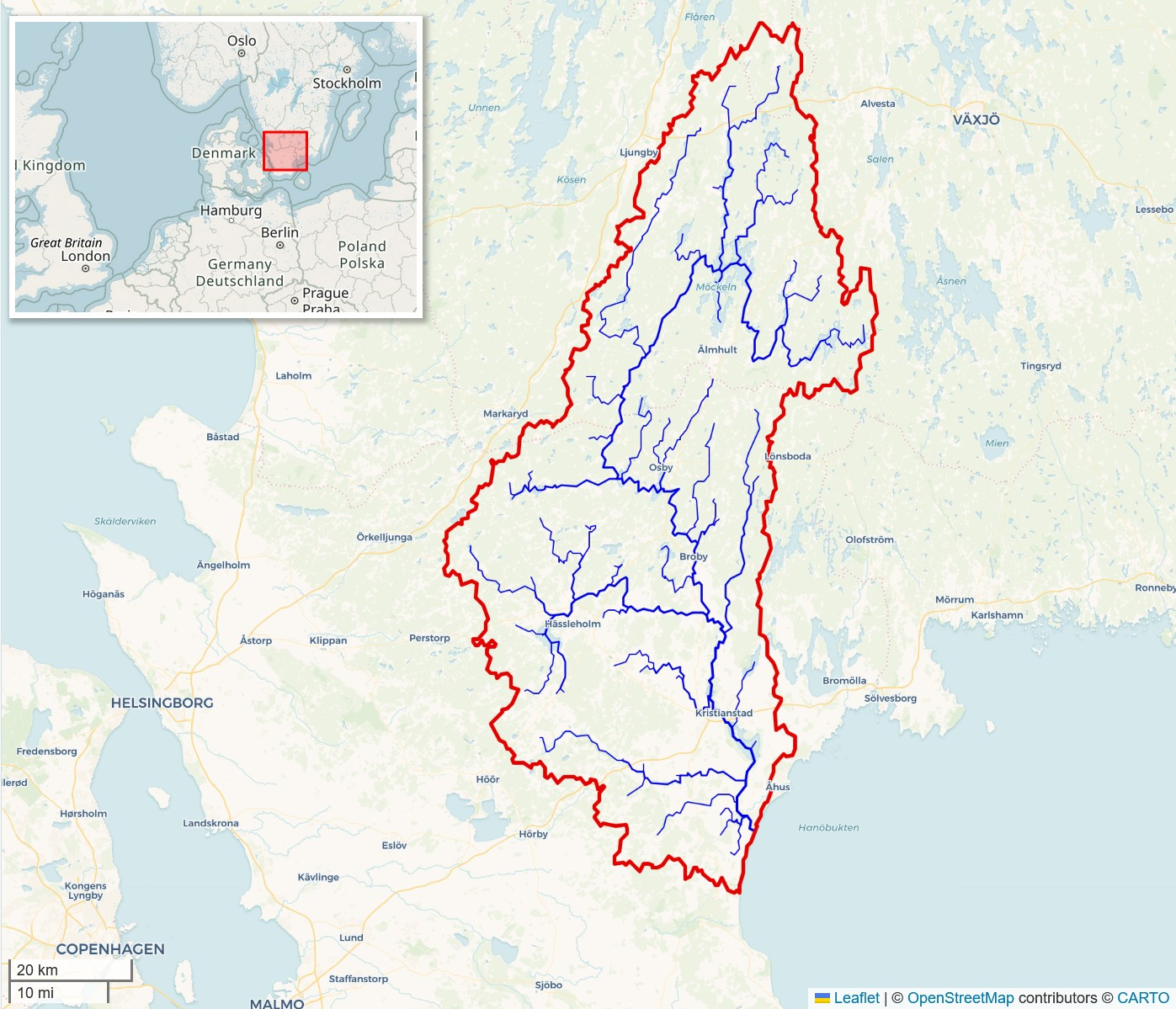
- Helge River watershed (Interactive map)
- Native name: Helge å (Swedish); Helgeån (Swedish)

Location
- Country: Sweden

Physical characteristics
- Mouth: Hanöbukten
  - coordinates: 55°51′30″N 14°14′10″E
  - elevation: 0 m (0 ft)
- Length: 190 km (120 mi)
- Basin size: 4,748.9 km^{2} (1,833.6 sq mi)
- Discharge
  - average: 55 m^{3}/s (1,900 cu ft/s)
  - maximum: 320 m^{3}/s (11,000 cu ft/s)

Basin features
- Designation

Ramsar Wetland
- Official name: Helge å
- Designated: 5 December 1974
- Reference no.: 16

The Helge River (Swedish: Helgeån, lit. "the Holy river"; alternatively Helge å), is a river in Sweden which flows through the southern provinces of Småland and Skåne. The course of the river takes it through Kristianstad and out to the Bay of Hanöbukten in the Baltic Sea.

In the southern parts, there are large wetland areas with a rich bird life. The Kristianstads Vattenrike (The Rich Wetlands of Kristianstad/Water Kingdom) reserve extends along 35km and covers 100,000 hectares in the river's lower course near the city of Kristianstad and the Bay of Hanöbukten. This wetland is recognized as having international importance under the Ramsar Convention.

Within the catchment area, there are 14 major lakes and 16 watercourses designated as being of national or regional value. There are also 64 Natura 2000 areas, 14 of which have been established because of their high nature values in the water.

== See also ==
- Battle of Helgeå
