= Ryssberget =

Coordinates: 56°08′00″N 14°34′30″E

Ryssberget is a hill in the municipality of Sölvesborg, in the southeastern Swedish province of Blekinge. Ryssberget is made up of some of the oldest stone in Blekinge, so-called metavulcanites created about 1700 million years ago.

As the ice age came to an end, the ice melted away creating the Baltic Ice Lake. This covered most of what is now mainland Blekinge and Scania. The highest level of the lake can be seen on Ryssberget and is called the highest coast line (Swedish: högsta kustlinjen). As the glaciers continued to melt, land began to rise and this created in turn what is now the Baltic Sea.
