= Ysane =

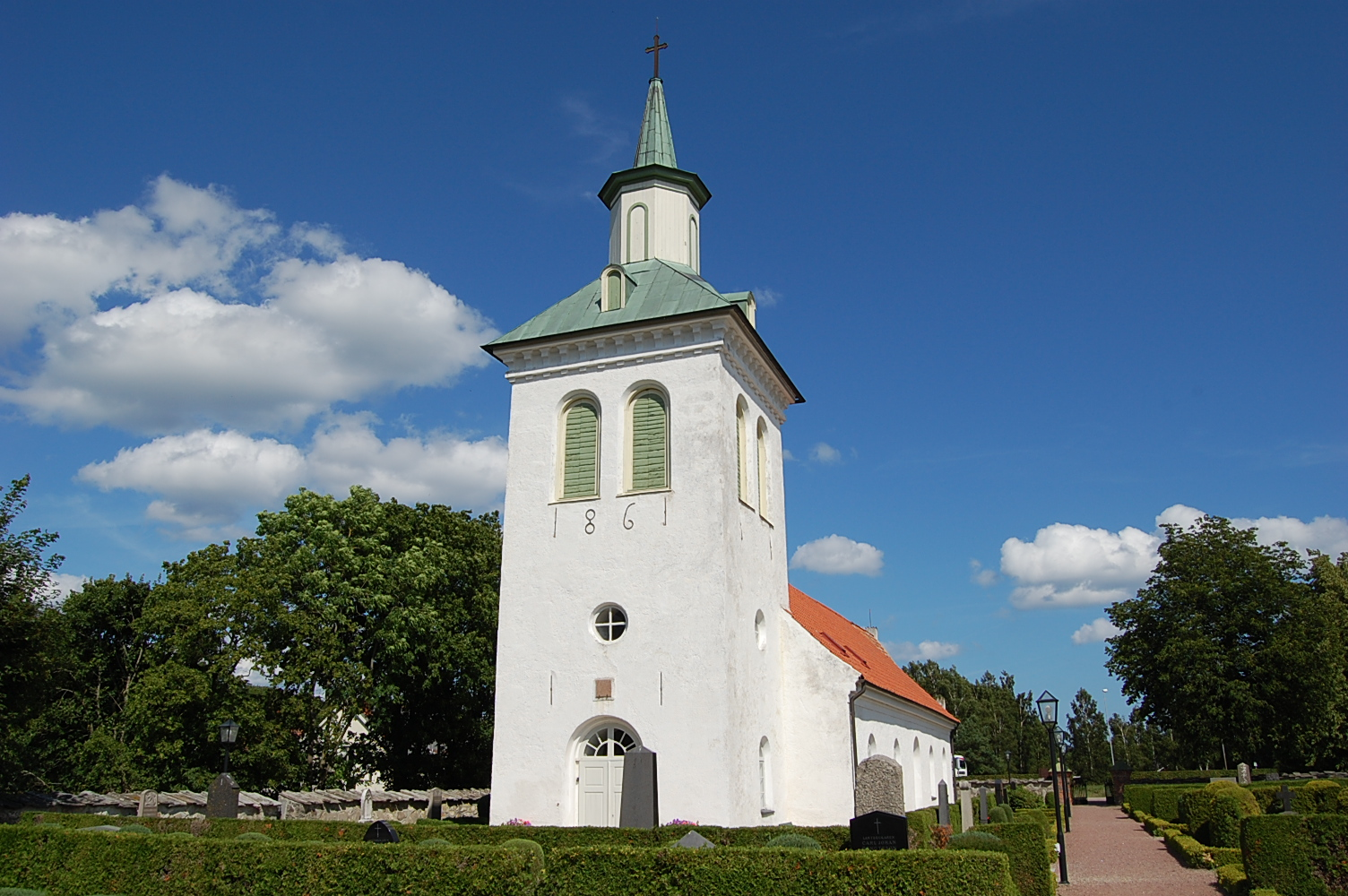
- The church in Ysane

- Location within Sweden
- Coordinates: 56°05′N 14°39′E
- Country: Sweden
- Province: Blekinge
- County: Blekinge County
- Municipality: Sölvesborg Municipality

Area
  - Total: 0.56 km^{2} (0.22 sq mi)

Population (2005-12-31)
  - Total: 212
  - Density: 380/km^{2} (980/sq mi)
- Time zone: UTC+1 (CET)
  - Summer (DST): UTC+2 (CEST)

Ysane is a village situated in Sölvesborg Municipality, Blekinge County, Sweden with 212 inhabitants in 2005. It was its own municipality between 1861 and 1952. The community was built around the church, which stems from the late 13th century.
