= Blekinge-Bornholm Province =

The Blekinge-Bornholm Province (also known as Blekinge-Bornholm Block) is an area of the Fennoscandian Shield spanning the Swedish province of Blekinge and the nearby island of Bornholm in the Baltic Sea.

Common rocks in the province are granitoids, orthogneiss and migmatite formed in the Late Paleoproterozoic next to a subduction zone that existed south of the Fennoscandian Shield.
