= Hörvik =

- Location within Blekinge Location within Sweden
- Coordinates: 56°02′N 14°46′E
- Country: Sweden
- Province: Blekinge
- County: Blekinge County
- Municipality: Sölvesborg Municipality

Area
  - Total: 0.89 km^{2} (0.34 sq mi)

Population (31 December 2010)
  - Total: 784
  - Density: 879/km^{2} (2,280/sq mi)
- Time zone: UTC+1 (CET)
  - Summer (DST): UTC+2 (CEST)

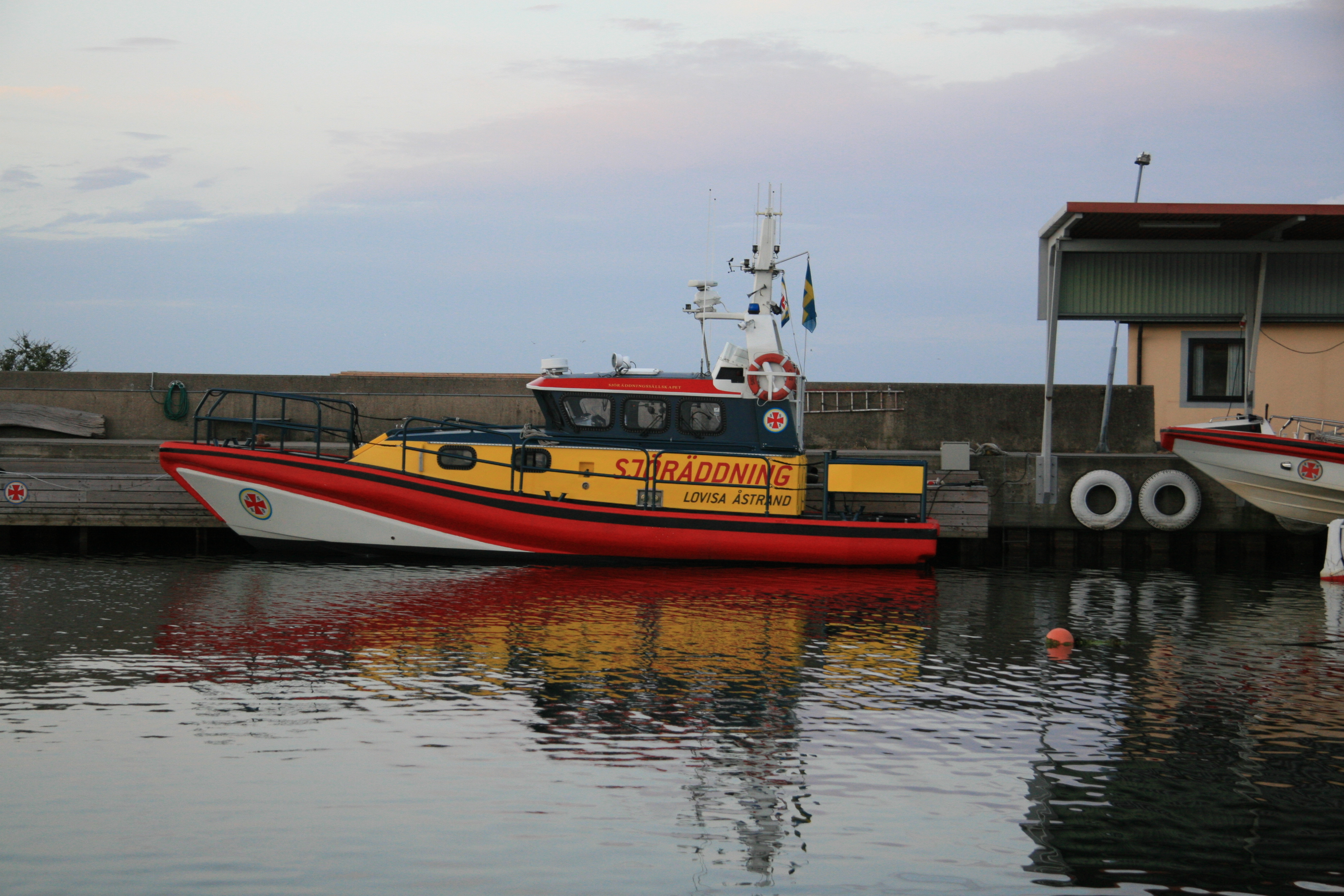
Hörvik in 2008

Hörvik is a locality situated in Sölvesborg Municipality, Blekinge County, Sweden with 784 inhabitants in 2010.
