= Elleholms House =

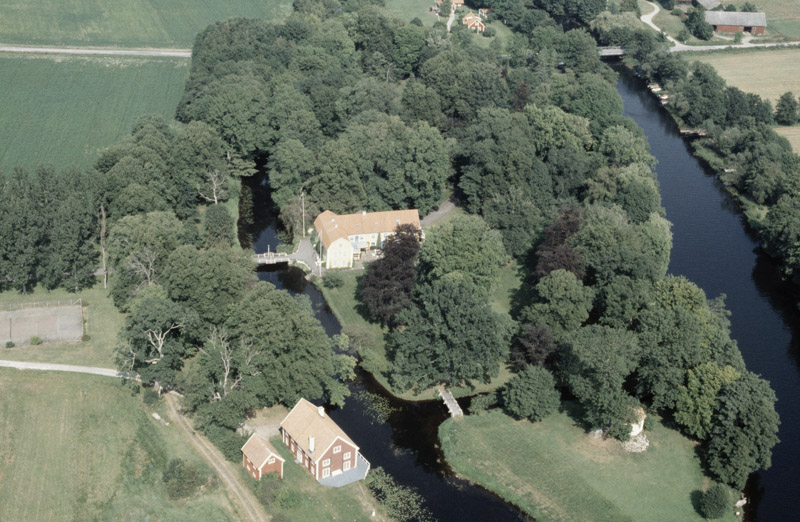
- Elleholms hovgård

- Location within Blekinge

General information
- Location: Blekinge, Sweden
- Coordinates: 56°9′47″N 14°45′02″E

Elleholms House (Swedish: Elleholms hovgård) is a manor house located in Blekinge County, Sweden. It is situated on the islet of the Mörrumsån river in the parish of Elleholm in Karlshamn Municipality.

== History ==
Elleholm was a considerable estate dating from the medieval period. Elleholm is ravaged during the Engelbrekt rebellion in 1436. The Swedish crown took over the property during the time of the Reformation in Sweden.
