= Nogersund =

- Location within Blekinge Location within Sweden
- Coordinates: 56°00′N 14°44′E
- Country: Sweden
- Province: Blekinge
- County: Blekinge County
- Municipality: Sölvesborg Municipality

Area
  - Total: 0.52 km^{2} (0.20 sq mi)

Population (31 December 2010)
  - Total: 495
  - Density: 958/km^{2} (2,480/sq mi)
- Time zone: UTC+1 (CET)
  - Summer (DST): UTC+2 (CEST)

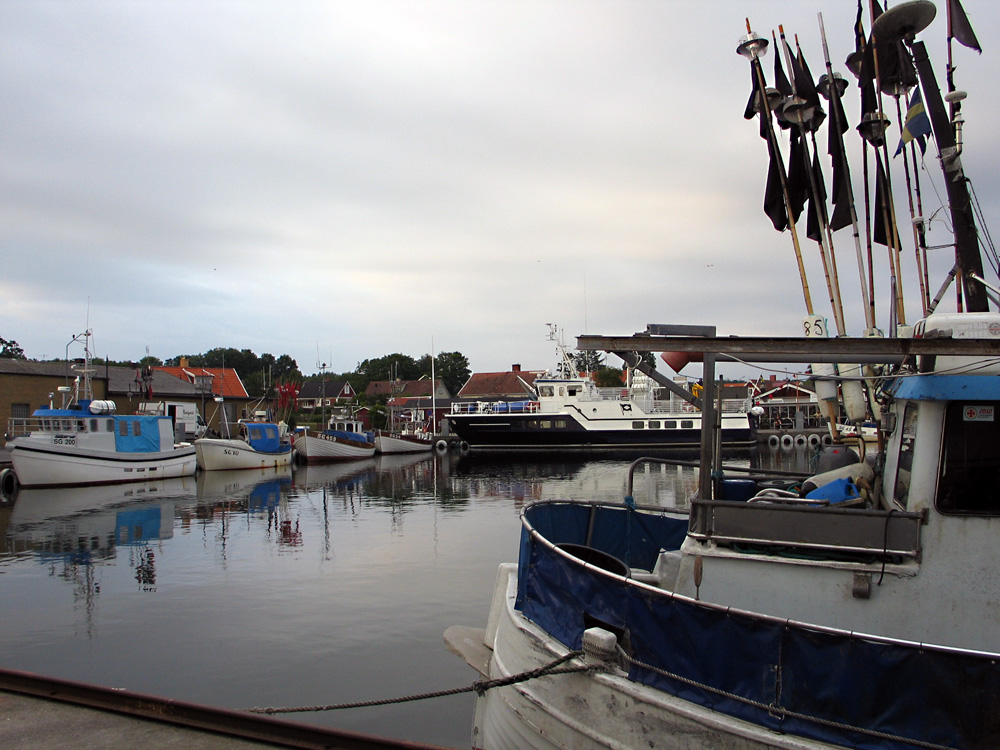
Nogersund port, Blekinge, Sweden

Nogersund is a locality situated in Sölvesborg Municipality, Blekinge County, Sweden with 495 inhabitants in 2010.
