= Norje =

- Location within Blekinge Location within Sweden
- Coordinates: 56°07′N 14°40′E
- Country: Sweden
- Province: Blekinge
- County: Blekinge County
- Municipality: Sölvesborg Municipality

Area
  - Total: 0.99 km^{2} (0.38 sq mi)

Population (31 December 2010)
  - Total: 657
  - Density: 665/km^{2} (1,720/sq mi)
- Time zone: UTC+1 (CET)
  - Summer (DST): UTC+2 (CEST)

Norje is a locality situated in Sölvesborg Municipality, Blekinge County, Sweden with 657 inhabitants in 2010.

Since 1998, Norje has been the location of the Sweden Rock Festival.
