= Hanö Bay =

Bay on the east coast of Skåne, South Sweden

Coordinates: 55°50′N 14°27′E

Hanö Bay (Swedish: Hanöbukten) is a sandy bay, stretching from Listerlandet in the north to Stenshuvud in the south, on the east coast of Skåne, South Sweden. It is named after Hanö island.

== Gallery ==
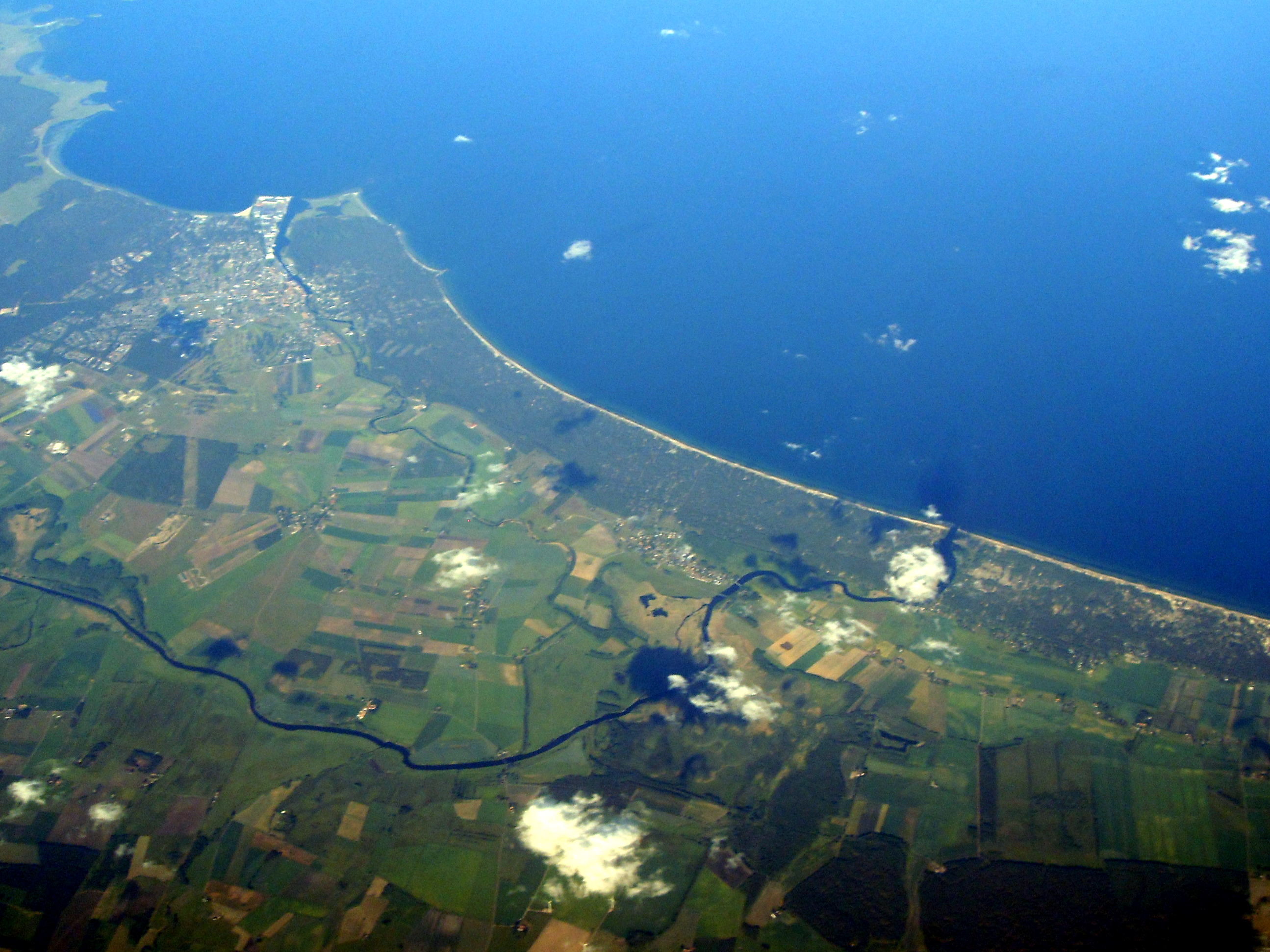

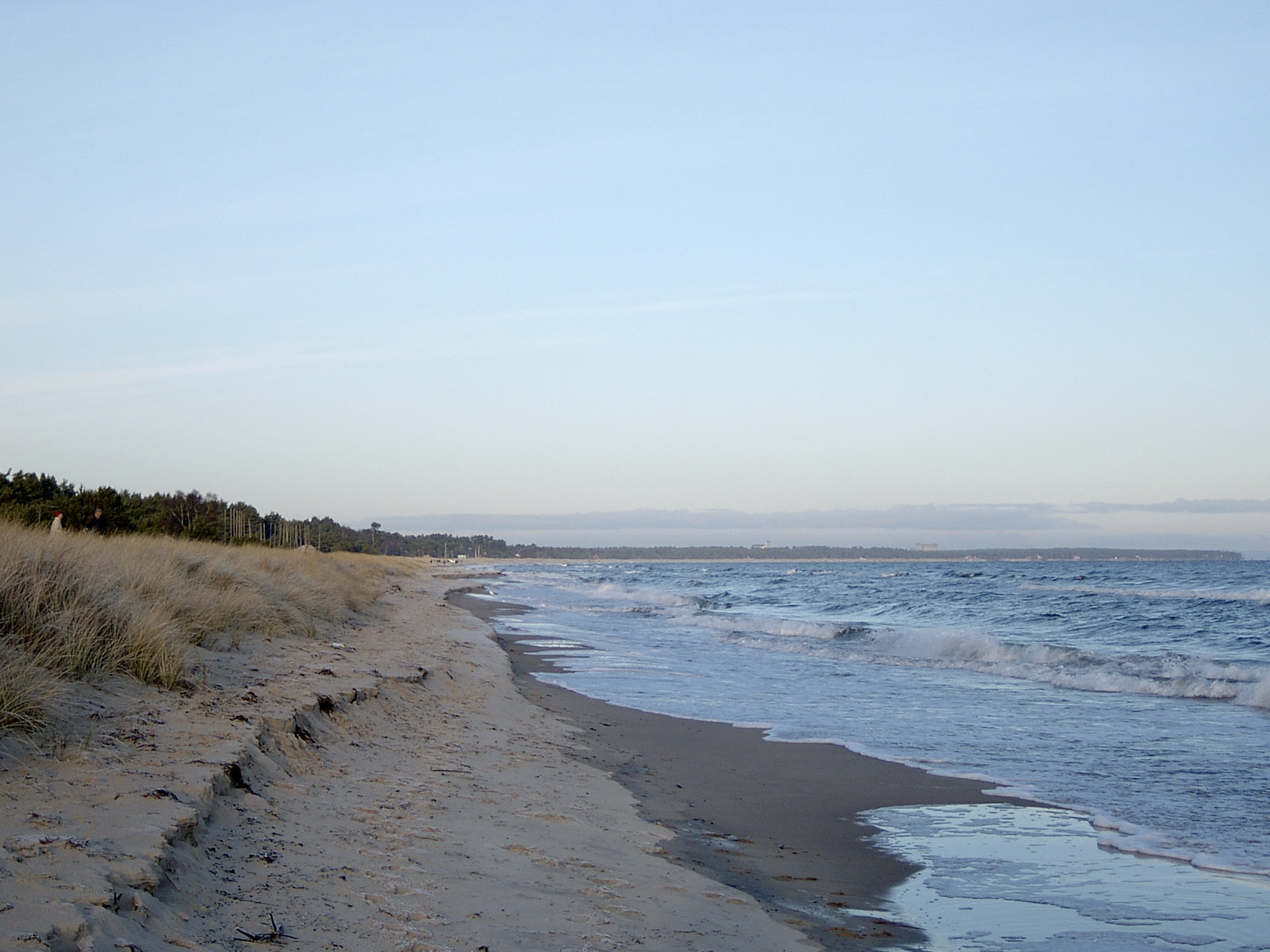
Hanöbukten seen from Yngsjö

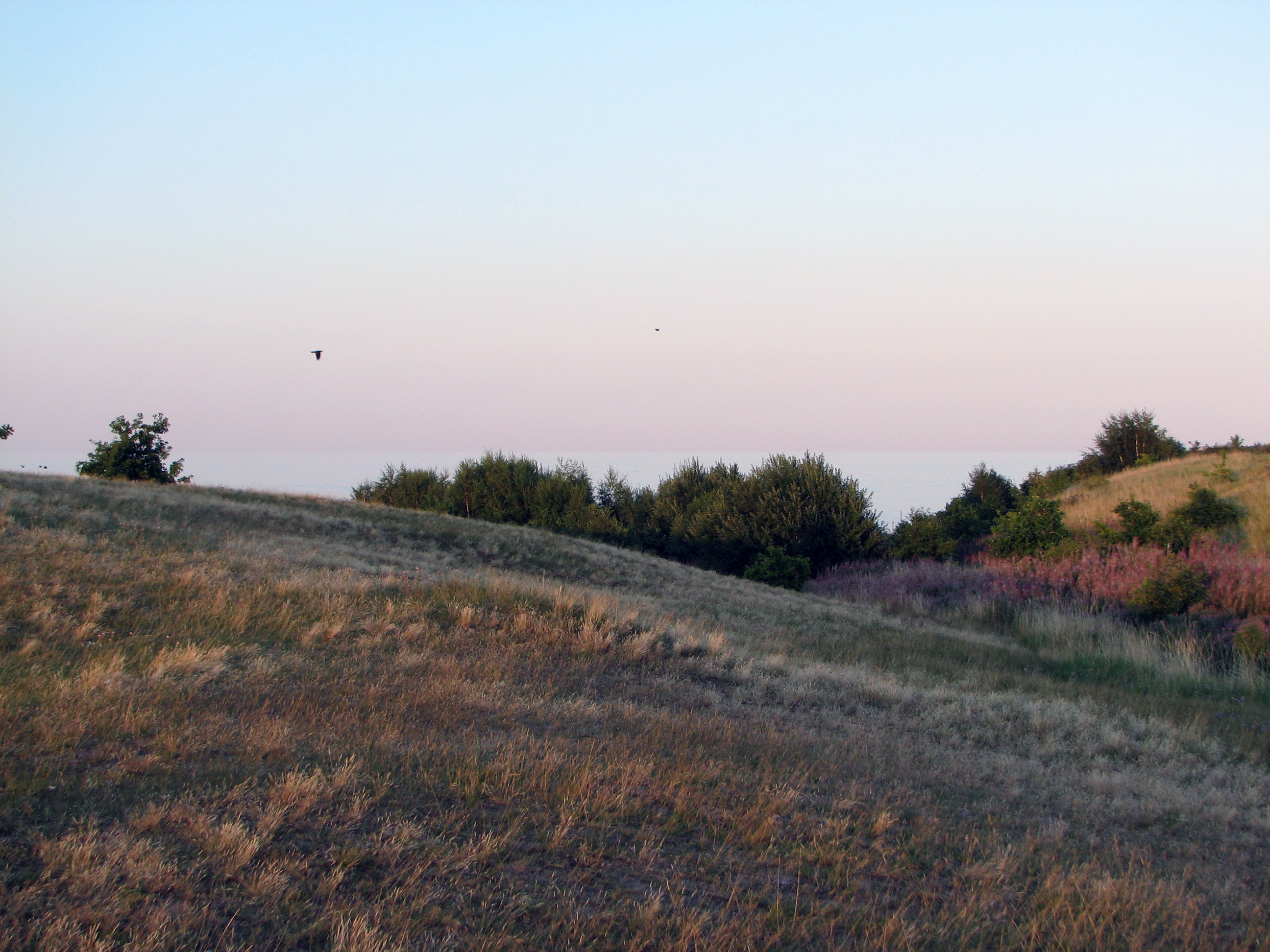
Hanöbukten seen from Kivik
