= Sölvesborg Municipality =

Sölvesborg Municipality Sölvesborgs kommun
- Municipality
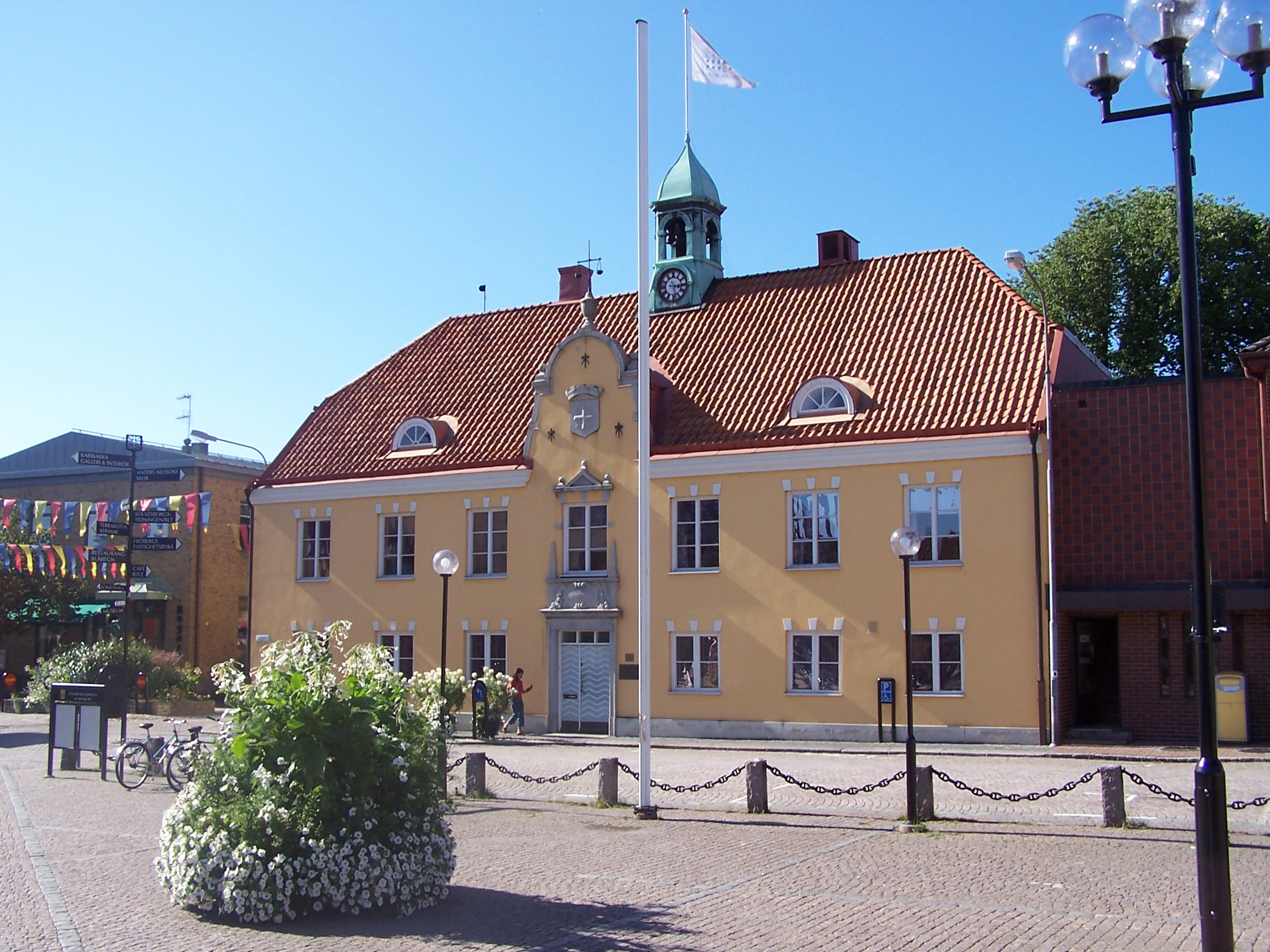
- Sölvesborg City Hall

- Flag Coat of arms

- Coordinates: 56°03′N 14°35′E
- Country: Sweden
- County: Blekinge County
- Seat: Sölvesborg

Area
  - Total: 1,106.4 km^{2} (427.2 sq mi)
  - Land: 185.31 km^{2} (71.55 sq mi)
  - Water: 921.09 km^{2} (355.63 sq mi)
- Area as of 1 January 2014.

Population (30 June 2025)
  - Total: 17,412
  - Density: 93.961/km^{2} (243.36/sq mi)
- Time zone: UTC+1 (CET)
  - Summer (DST): UTC+2 (CEST)
- ISO 3166 code: SE
- Province: Blekinge
- Municipal code: 1083
- Website: www.solvesborg.se

Sölvesborg Municipality (Swedish: Sölvesborgs kommun) is a municipality in Blekinge County in South Sweden in southern Sweden. It borders to Bromölla Municipality, Olofström Municipality and Karlshamn Municipality. The town Sölvesborg is the seat of the municipality.

The present municipality was formed in 1971 when the City of Sölvesborg was amalgamated with the rural municipalities Gammalstorp and Mjällby.

== Politics ==
The Sölvesborg Party was formed ahead of the 2002 election by a group of former Green Party members. Party councillors are Dan Boberg and Bo Sandquist.

In the 2002 elections the party got 4.7% of the votes (472 votes) and two seats in the municipal assembly (kommunfullmäktige)

In the 2006 elections the party got 2.7% of the votes (277 votes) and one seat in the municipal assembly.

The municipality otherwise reflect the same political majorities as in its neighbouring municipalities of Bromölla, Olofström and Karlshamn.

In December 2018 Louise Erixon, partner of Jimmie Åkesson, the populist party's leader of Sweden Democrats, was made mayor of Sölvesborg.

== Localities ==
There are 10 urban areas (also called a Tätort or locality) in Sölvesborg Municipality.

In the table the localities are listed according to the size of the population as of December 31, 2005. The municipal seat is in bold characters.

#	Locality	Population
1	**Sölvesborg**	7,883
2	Mjällby	1,272
3	Hällevik	776
3	Hörvik	776
5	Norje	674
6	Nogersund	532
7	Pukavik	283
8	Lörby	243
9	Ysane	212
10	Valjeviken	211

A minor part of Valje is also situated in the municipality. The main part of Valje is, however, in Bromölla Municipality.

== Demographics ==
This is a demographic table based on Sölvesborg Municipality's electoral districts in the 2022 Swedish general election sourced from SVT's election platform, in turn taken from SCB official statistics.

In total there were 17,519 residents, including 13,897 Swedish citizens of voting age. 35.4% voted for the left coalition and 63.6% for the right coalition. Indicators are in percentage points except population totals and income.

Location	Residents	Citizen adults	Left vote	Right vote	Employed	Swedish parents	Foreign heritage	Income SEK	Degree
Location			%	%					
Falkvik	2,447	1,875	36.3	62.6	81	82	18	24,934	35
Furulund	2,403	1,961	44.9	53.7	73	77	23	20,533	35
Gammalstorp	1,232	952	25.3	73.7	85	87	13	25,622	28
Hjortakroken	1,496	1,109	43.8	55.7	75	77	23	23,729	30
Hällevik	1,578	1,308	28.7	69.6	85	94	6	25,731	39
Hörvik	1,210	988	25.9	72.9	86	94	6	26,862	33
Mjällby	1,935	1,504	31.6	67.4	76	83	17	22,303	25
Möllebacken	2,300	1,799	38.7	60.5	86	89	11	26,915	42
Norje	1,418	1,138	34.6	64.4	81	87	13	24,823	25
Siretorp	1,500	1,263	36.1	62.8	83	91	9	26,236	35
Source: SVT

== Parishes ==
All parishes belonged to Lister Hundred:

- Gammalstorp Parish
- Mjällby Parish
- Sölvesborg Parish
- Ysane Parish

== Twin towns – sister cities ==
Sölvesborg is twinned with:

- Malbork, Poland
- Wolgast, Germany
