= Listerlandet =

Swedish peninsula

Coordinates: 56.04556°N 14.67695°E

Listerlandet is a peninsula in Sölvesborg Municipality, Blekinge County, Sweden. Its main settlement is Sölvesborg.

== History ==
Listerlandet was originally in practice an island, surrounded by the Baltic Sea to the south, west and east, and in north the sound known as Vesan and the Pukavik channel. The sound was deep enough for navigation until the 18th century. After this, the vegetation took over. The project to drain the area, to enable farming to take over the land began in the 1860s and continued until the 1870s, when the sea took over the land. The project was then abandoned for the remainder of the 19th century.

Remains of people have been found in Listerlandet (e.g. in Sandviken and Siretorp) dating back to the Stone Age and Bronze Age.

In 1985 a high-power broadcasting station, Sölvesborg medium wave transmitter, was built at its tip.
