= Blekinge =

Historical province of Sweden

- Historical province
- Flag Coat of arms

- Coordinates: 56°20′N 15°20′E
- Country: Sweden
- Land: Götaland
- County: Blekinge County

Area
  - Total: 3,055 km^{2} (1,180 sq mi)

Population (31 December 2023)
  - Total: 157,973
  - Density: 51.71/km^{2} (133.9/sq mi)

Ethnicity
  - Language: Swedish

Culture
  - Flower: Oak and mullein
  - Animal: Lucanus cervus
  - Bird: Nuthatch
  - Fish: Cod
- Time zone: UTC+1 (CET)
  - Summer (DST): UTC+2 (CEST)
- Area codes: 0454–0457

Blekinge (Swedish pronunciation: [ˈblêːkɪŋɛ]) is one of the traditional Swedish provinces (landskap), situated in the southern coast of the geographic region of Götaland, in southern Sweden. It borders Småland, Scania and the Baltic Sea. It is the country's second-smallest province by area (only Öland is smaller), and the smallest province located on the mainland.

The name "Blekinge" comes from the dialectal adjective bleke, which corresponds to the nautical term for "dead calm".

== Administration ==
The historical provinces of Sweden serve no administrative function. However, Blekinge is the only province, besides Gotland, which covers exactly the same area as the administrative county, which is Blekinge County.

== Heraldry ==
Blekinge was granted its current arms in 1660 at the time of the funeral of King Charles X Gustav of Sweden (1622–1660) based on a seal from the 15th century. Symbolically the three crowns from the Coat of arms of Sweden had been placed on the trunk of the tree to mark the change in status of the former Danish province, that now belonged to Sweden. The arms is represented with a ducal coronet. Blazon: "Azure, an Oak Tree eradicated Or ensigned with three Crowns palewise of the same."

== Geography ==
Relative to the rest of Sweden Blekinge has warm summers and mild winters. Blekinge has a scenic archipelago and is sometimes called "Sweden's garden" (Swedish: Sveriges trädgård).

The nature of Blekinge is characterized by its oak forests with occasional hazel and common hornbeam. The relief is an uneven joint valley terrain with straight and narrow valley bottoms that widen towards the coast. Bedrock in Blekinge is mostly granite and gneiss of the Blekinge-Bornholm rock province.

== History ==
Evidence of human habitation in western Blekinge dates circa 9700 BC in the Vesan area. At this time, Vesan was a small island surrounded by open grassland. A later settlement in the nearby Ljungaviken is dated to 6500 BC and contains the remains of at least 50 wooden houses and a buried dog.

In 2021 a survey and sampling of remnants of a pile barrier in the bay of Lyckeby (beyond Karlskrona in the Blekinge archipelago) established that the wood used was felled in 1113-14. The barrier was 5 metres wide, at points raised 60 cm above the seabed.

Blekinge was a part of Sweden until the early 13th century when it became part of Denmark (the Danish Census Book contains the first secure written evidence of Danish control). It then remained a Danish province until 1658, and together with the provinces of Skåne and Halland, it made up Skåneland, the eastern part of the Danish kingdom where Scanian Law (Skånske Lov) prevailed. As a border province, Blekinge was often raided and looted by Swedish troops during Danish–Swedish wars. In 1658, it was ceded to Sweden according to the Treaty of Roskilde and has remained Swedish ever since.

During the Danish era, the port town of Sölvesborg was the seat of the administration in the western part of the province and Kristianopel in the eastern part. Notable fortifications during this period included sites at Elleholm, Sölvesborg, Lyckeby and Avaskär. Towns in Blekinge with city privileges were: Ronneby (1387), Sölvesborg (1445), Elleholm and Kristianopel. After the Swedish takeover two new towns, Karlshamn (chartered in 1664) and Karlskrona (1680), were built, and the populations of Ronneby and Kristianopel were forcibly relocated to them. Karlskrona has for more than 300 years been the principal naval base in Sweden.

=== Subdivisions ===
Hundreds (in Götaland incl. Blekinge called härad in Swedish, in Svealand called hundare) were the historical subdivisions of a Swedish province. Blekinge's hundreds were Bräkne Hundred, Eastern Hundred, Lister Hundred, and Medelstad Hundred.

== Language ==
In Blekinge the dialect was historically closely related to Danish and eastern Scanian, which is most likely an effect of the former administrative links to Scania. Today, the dialect is not as significant as before, with the exception of Listerlandet with its special language.

== Sports ==
Football in the province is administered by Blekinge Fotbollförbund.

== See also ==
- Blekinge Institute of Technology
- Blekinge archipelago
