= European route E22 in Sweden =

Highway in Sweden

European Road E22
- Europaväg 22
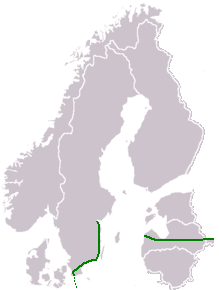

Route information
- Length: 560 km (350 mi)

Major junctions
- West end: Trelleborg
- East end: Norrköping

Location
- Country: Sweden

Highway system
- International E-road network; A Class; B Class

The European route E22 in Sweden goes between Trelleborg and Norrköping and is a part of the European route E22. The Swedish E22 has mixed standard, varying between motorway (motorväg), two-lane expressway (motortrafikled), 2+1 road (mötesfri motortrafikled) and a fairly wide ordinary road. It is generally built from around 1950 until today and more is under construction and even more is planned. Sweden's first motorway Malmö-Lund (from 1953) is included in E22 as well as motorway sections southwest and east of Kristianstad opened 2020 and 2025.

== Notable accidents and incidents ==
- From 3 to 4 January 2024 at least 1000 cars were snowed in between Hörby and Kristianstad for a day with people spending the night in their vehicles. The Swedish Army intervened in the situation, helping citizens get out of their vehicles and supplying them with basic amenities.

== Junctions ==
No	Directions
	Ferry line Trelleborg-Sassnitz
	Maglarp
6	Skegrie
7	Håslöv
8	Vellinge
9	Vellinge
10	Vellinge
11	Västra Klagstorp, Tygelsjö
12	Copenhagen, Malmö
13	Lockarp
14	Ystad, Sturup, Malmö
15	Kvarnby, Klågerup
16	Malmö, Staffanstorp, Simrishamn
17	Arlöv
18	Gothenburg
19	Lund
20	Dalby, Lund
21	Dalby, Lund
22	Bjärred, Lund, Ideon
23	Kävlinge, Sjöbo, Eslöv
24	Flyinge
25	Löberöd, Skarhult, Hurva
26	Höör, Hässleholm, Växjö
27	Landskrona, Eslöv
	Fogdarp
	Osbyholm
28	Osbyholm
29	Höör, Ystad, Hörby
30	Hörby
	Hörby North
	Hörby North
31	Hörby North
32	Ekeröd
33	Linderöd
34	Linderöd
35	Everöd, Åhus, Kristianstad Airport
36	Vä
37	Kristianstad, Helsingborg, Osby
38	Norra Åsum
39	Kristianstad
40	Åhus, Broby
41	Fjälkinge
42	Bäckaskog
43	Gualöv
44	Bromölla, Olofström
45	Sölvesborg
46	Sölvesborg, Gammalstorp
47	Mjällby, Nogersund, Hanö, Hällevik
48	Halmstad, Olofström
	Stensnäs
	Stensnäs
49	Mörrum, Svängsta
50	Mörrum
51	Karlshamn, Växjö
52	Karlshamn, Asarum
53	Karlshamn, Hällaryd
54	Åryd
55	Bräkne-Hoby
56	Ronneby, Kallinge, Växjö, Göteborg
57	Ronneby, Kallinge
58	Ronneby, Ronnebyhamn
	Björketorp
59	Listerby, Johannishus
60	Hasslö
	Nättraby
61	Nättraby
62	Allatorp, Skärva
63	Karlskrona
	Rosenholm
64	Karlskrona
