= List of former municipalities of Sweden =

This list contains some of the defunct municipalities of Sweden. The total number of municipalities has been reduced from 2,500 in 1863 to 290 today.

== 1880–1974 ==
These municipalities were merged into others in between the two major municipality reforms in 1952 and 1974.

- Almunge, merged into Uppsala Municipality 1971
- Asarum merged into Karlshamn Municipality 1967
- Blidö, merged into Norrtälje Municipality 1971
- Boo, merged into Nacka 1971
- Brunskog Municipality, merged into Arvika Municipality och Kil Municipality 1971
- Dalarö, merged into Österhaninge Municipality 1959
- Dalby, merged into Lund Municipality, 1974
- Djursholm, merged into Danderyd Municipality 1971
- Djurö, merged into Värmdö Municipality 1974
- Ed Municipality, merged into Grums Municipality 1969
- Ekshärad Municipality, merged into Hagfors Municipality 1971
- Finnskoga-Dalby Municipality, merged into Torsby Municipality 1974
- Frykerud Municipality, merged into Kil Municipality 1971
- Fryksände Municipality, merged into Torsby Municipality 1967
- Frösåker, merged into Östhammar Municipality 1957
- Frötuna, merged into Norrtälje Municipality 1971
- Färingsö, merged into Ekerö Municipality 1971
- Genarp Municipality
- Gillberga Municipality, merged into Säffle Municipality 1971
- Glava Municipality, merged into Arvika Municipality and Karlstad Municipality 1971
- Gräsmark Municipality, merged into Sunne Municipality 1971
- Grödinge, merged into Botkyrka Municipality 1971
- Gunnarskog Municipality, merged into Arvika Municipality 1971
- Gustaf Adolf Municipality, merged into Hagfors Municipality 1974
- Gustavsberg, merged into Värmdö Municipality 1974
- Holmedal Municipality, merged into Årjäng Municipality 1971
- Hällaryd merged into Karlshamn Municipality 1967
- Häverö, merged into Norrtälje Municipality 1971
- Järna, merged into Södertälje Municipality 1971
- Järnskog Municipality, merged into Eda Municipality 1971
- Klintehamn Municipality, merged into Gotland Municipality 1971
- Knivsta, merged into Uppsala 1971 (recreated 2003)
- Knutby, merged into Uppsala och Norrtälje 1971
- Kroppa Municipality, merged into Filipstad Municipality 1971
- Kvillinge Municipality, merged into Norrköping Municipality 1971
- Kävlinge köping (1946–1971), changed name to Kävlinge Municipality
- Köla Municipality, merged into Eda Municipality 1971
- Lysvik Municipality, merged into Sunne Municipality 1971
- Mörrum merged into Karlshamn Municipality 1967
- Norra Ny Municipality, merged into Torsby Municipality 1974
- Norra Råda Municipality, merged into Hagfors Municipality 1974
- Nor Municipality, merged into Karlstad Municipality 1971
- Nyed Municipality, merged into Karlstad Municipality 1971
- Nätra Municipality, merged into Örnsköldsvik Municipality 1971
- Rämmen Municipality, merged into Filipstad Municipality 1971
- Sillerud Municipality, merged into Årjäng Municipality 1971
- Stavnäs Municipality, merged into Arvika Municipality och Grums Municipality 1969
- Stora Kil Municipality, merged into Kil Municipality 1971
- Stora Sunne Municipality, merged into Sunne Municipality 1963
- Svanskog Municipality, merged into Säffle Municipality 1971
- Södra Sandby Municipality
- Torn Municipality (1952–1967)
- Töcksmark Municipality, merged into Årjäng Municipality 1974
- Ullerud Municipality, merged into Forshaga Municipality 1971
- Ullvättern Municipality, merged into Storfors Municipality 1967
- Veberöd Municipality
- Visnum Municipality, merged into Kristinehamn Municipality 1971
- Vitsand Municipality, merged into Torsby Municipality 1967
- Värmlandsberg Municipality, merged into Filipstad Municipality 1971
- Värmlandsnäs Municipality, merged into Säffle Municipality 1971
- Väse Municipality, merged into Karlstad Municipality and Kristinehamn Municipality 1971
- Västerhaninge, merged into Haninge Municipality 1971
- Åkerbo Municipality, merged into Linköping Municipality 1971
- Älgå Municipality, merged into Arvika Municipality 1971
- Österhaninge, merged into Haninge Municipality 1971
- Östmark Municipality, merged into Torsby Municipality 1971
- Östra Fågelvik Municipality, merged into Karlstad Municipality 1967

== 1952 ==
This is a partial list of the municipalities that were merged into others as part of the municipal reform of 1952.

- Alster Municipality, merged into Nyed Municipality
- Bjurtjärn Municipality, merged into Ullvättern Municipality
- Blomskog Municipality, merged into Holmedal Municipality
- Boda Municipality, merged into Brunskog Municipality
- Bogen Municipality, merged into Gunnarskog Municipality
- Borgvik Municipality, merged into Ed Municipality
- Botilsäter Municipality, merged into Värmlandsnäs Municipality
- Brattfors Municipality, merged into Värmlandsberg Municipality
- Bro Municipality, merged into Värmlandsnäs Municipality
- Elleholm merged into Mörrum Municipality
- Eskilsäter Municipality, merged into Värmlandsnäs Municipality
- Dalby Municipality, merged into Finnskoga-Dalby Municipality
- Färnebo Municipality, merged into Värmlandsberg Municipality
- Gåsborn Municipality, merged into Värmlandsberg Municipality
- Huggenäs Municipality, merged into Värmlandsnäs Municipality
- Hällaryd and Åryd, merged into Hällaryd Municipality
- Högerud Municipality, merged into Stavnäs Municipality
- Igelösa and Odarslöv Municipality (−1952)
- Karlanda Municipality, merged into Holmedal Municipality
- Kila Municipality, merged into Gillberga Municipality
- Lekvattnet Municipality, merged into Fryksände Municipality
- Lungsund Municipality, merged into Ullvättern Municipality
- Långserud Municipality, merged into Svanskog Municipality
- Mangskog Municipality, merged into Brunskog Municipality
- Millesvik Municipality, merged into Värmlandsnäs Municipality
- Nedre Ullerud Municipality, merged into Ullerud Municipality
- Nordmark Municipality, merged into Värmlandsberg Municipality
- Norra Finnskoga Municipality, merged into Finnskoga-Dalby Municipality
- Ny Municipality, merged into Älgå Municipality
- Nyskoga Municipality, merged into Vitsand Municipality
- Ransäter Municipality, merged into Munkfors Municipality
- Ringamåla merged into Asarum Municipality
- Rudskoga Municipality, merged into Visnum Municipality
- Segerstad Municipality, merged into Nor Municipality
- Sillbodal Municipality, merged into Årjängs köping
- Skillingmark Municipality, merged into Järnskog Municipality
- Sunnemo Municipality, merged into Norra Råda Municipality
- Södra Finnskoga Municipality, merged into Finnskoga-Dalby Municipality
- Södra Ny Municipality, merged into Värmlandsnäs Municipality
- Södra Råda Municipality, merged into Visnum Municipality
- Trankil Municipality, merged into Holmedal Municipality
- Tveta Municipality, merged into Säffle
- Varnum Municipality, merged into Kristinehamn
- Visnums-Kil Municipality, merged into Visnum Municipality
- Värmskog Municipality, merged into Stavnäs Municipality
- Västra Fågelvik Municipality, merged into Töcksmark Municipality
- Västra Ämtervik Municipality, merged into Stora Sunne Municipality
- Älvsbacka Municipality, merged into Nyed Municipality
- Ölme Municipality, merged into Väse Municipality
- Ölserud Municipality, merged into Värmlandsnäs Municipality
- Östervallskog Municipality, merged into Töcksmark Municipality
- Östra Ämtervik Municipality, merged into Stora Sunne Municipality
- Övre Ullerud Municipality, merged into Ullerud Municipality
