= 2014 Blekinge county election =

Regional council election in Blekinge County, Sweden

Blekinge County in Sweden held a county council election on 14 September 2014 on the same day as the general and municipal elections.

== Results ==
There were 47 seats, the same number as in 2010. The Social Democrats won the most seats at 19, a loss of one seat.

Party	Votes	%	Seats	±
Social Democrats	39,790	39.3	19	-1
Moderates	19,247	19.0	9	-1
Sweden Democrats	14,308	14.1	7	+2
Centre Party	5,871	5.8	3	0
Left Party	5,450	5.4	3	+1
People's Party	5,318	5.3	2	-1
Green Party	5,089	5.0	2	0
Christian Democrats	3,583	3.5	2	0
Others	2,497	2.5	0	0
Invalid/blank votes	1,937			
Total	104,593	100	47	0
Source:val.se

== Municipal results ==
Location	Turnout	Share	Votes	S	M	SD	C	V	FP	MP	KD	Other
Karlshamn	83.3	20.4	20,662	38.3	21.5	13.6	4.9	5.8	5.1	6.8	3.0	1.2
Karlskrona	85.5	41.9	42,424	40.5	18.8	12.4	5.6	5.2	6.3	5.4	4.2	1.4
Olofström	80.1	8.3	8,352	49.1	12.6	14.5	7.1	5.9	1.5	3.1	5.5	0.7
Ronneby	84.4	18.3	18,475	35.3	17.9	14.8	7.7	6.1	6.5	3.9	2.2	5.7
Sölvesborg	83.8	11.1	11,240	36.2	22.0	20.2	4.2	3.8	2.4	3.5	2.8	4.8
Total	84.2	100.0	101,153	39.3	19.0	14.1	5.8	5.4	5.3	5.0	3.4	2.5
Source: val.se
