= Karlshamn =

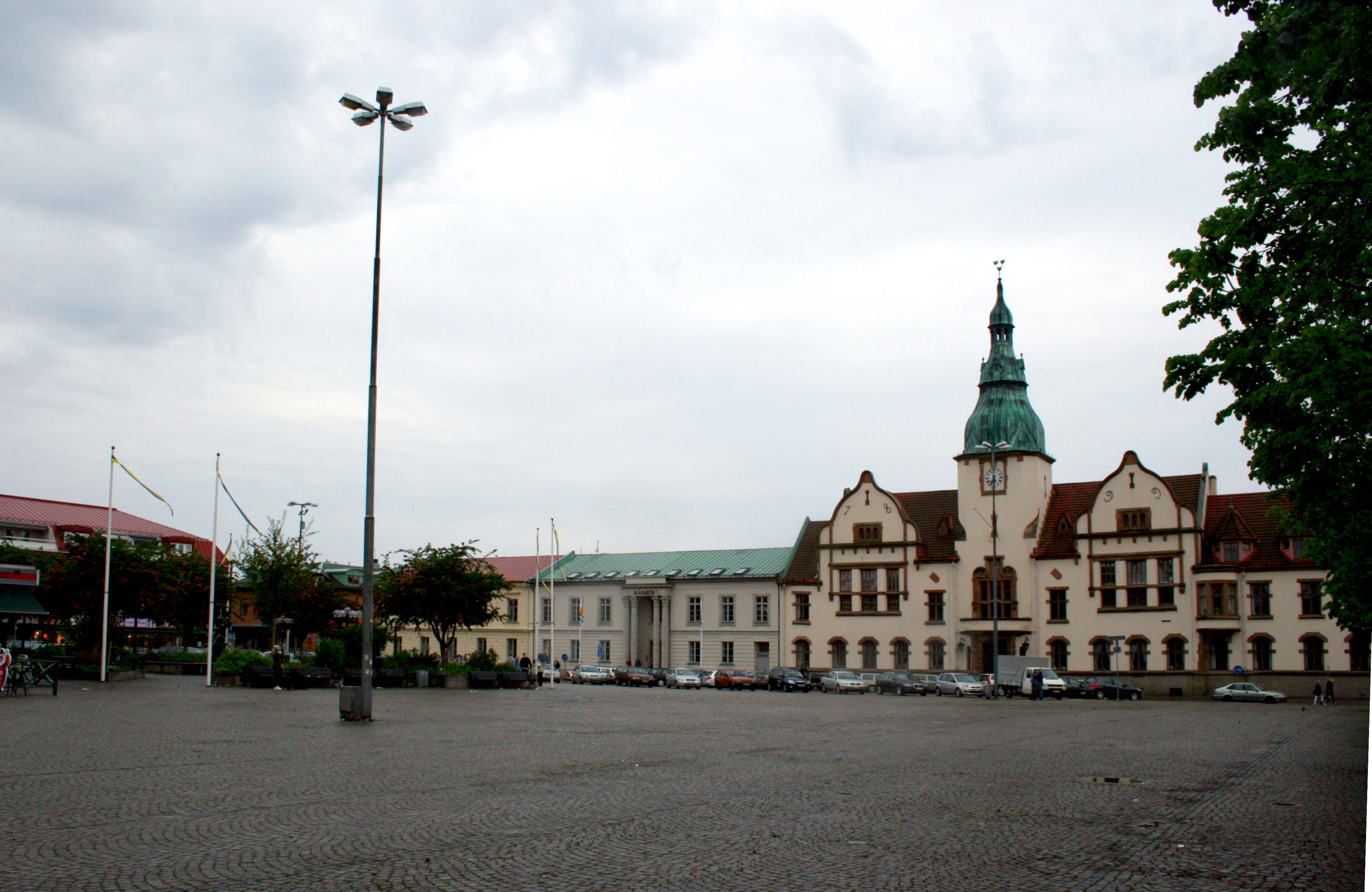
- Main square

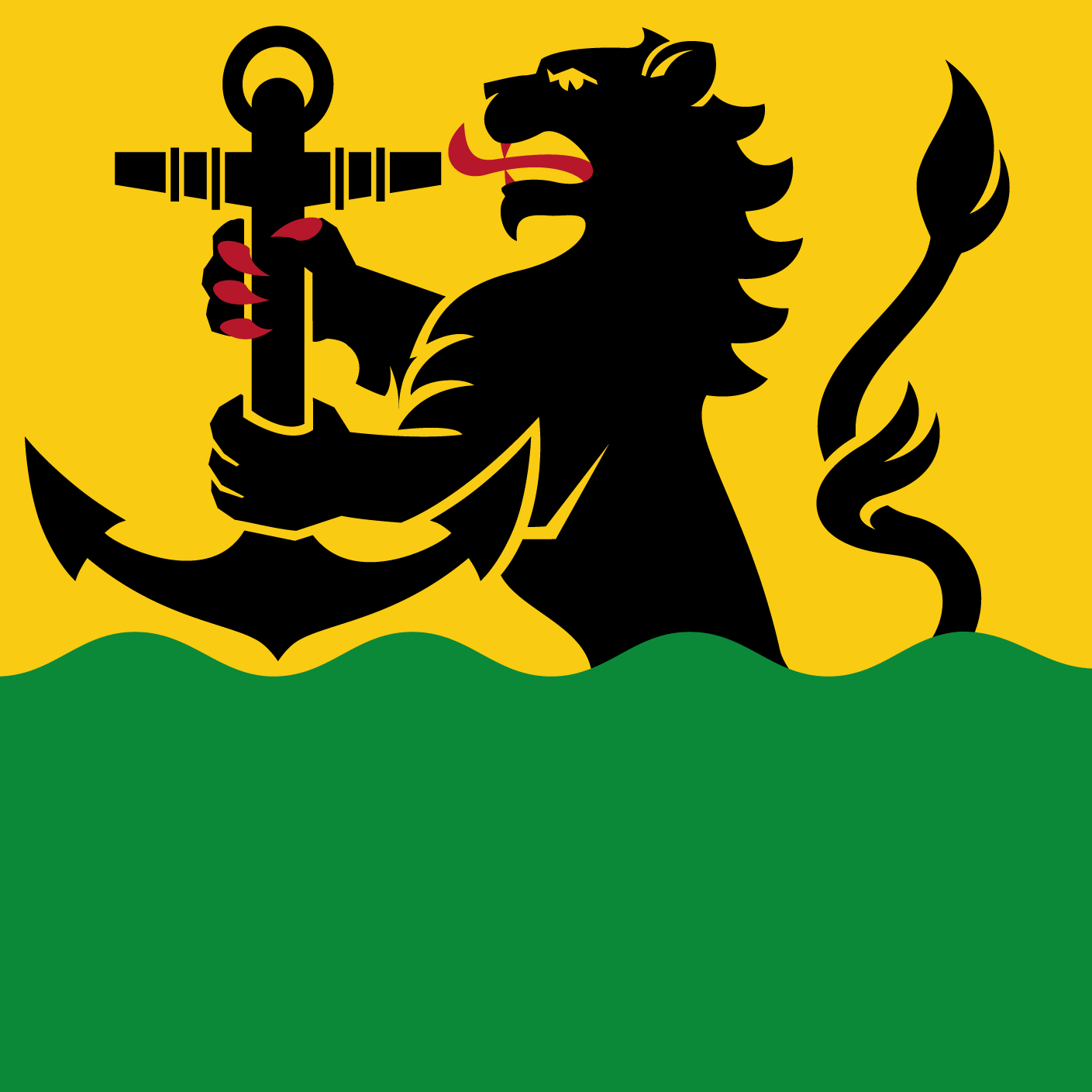
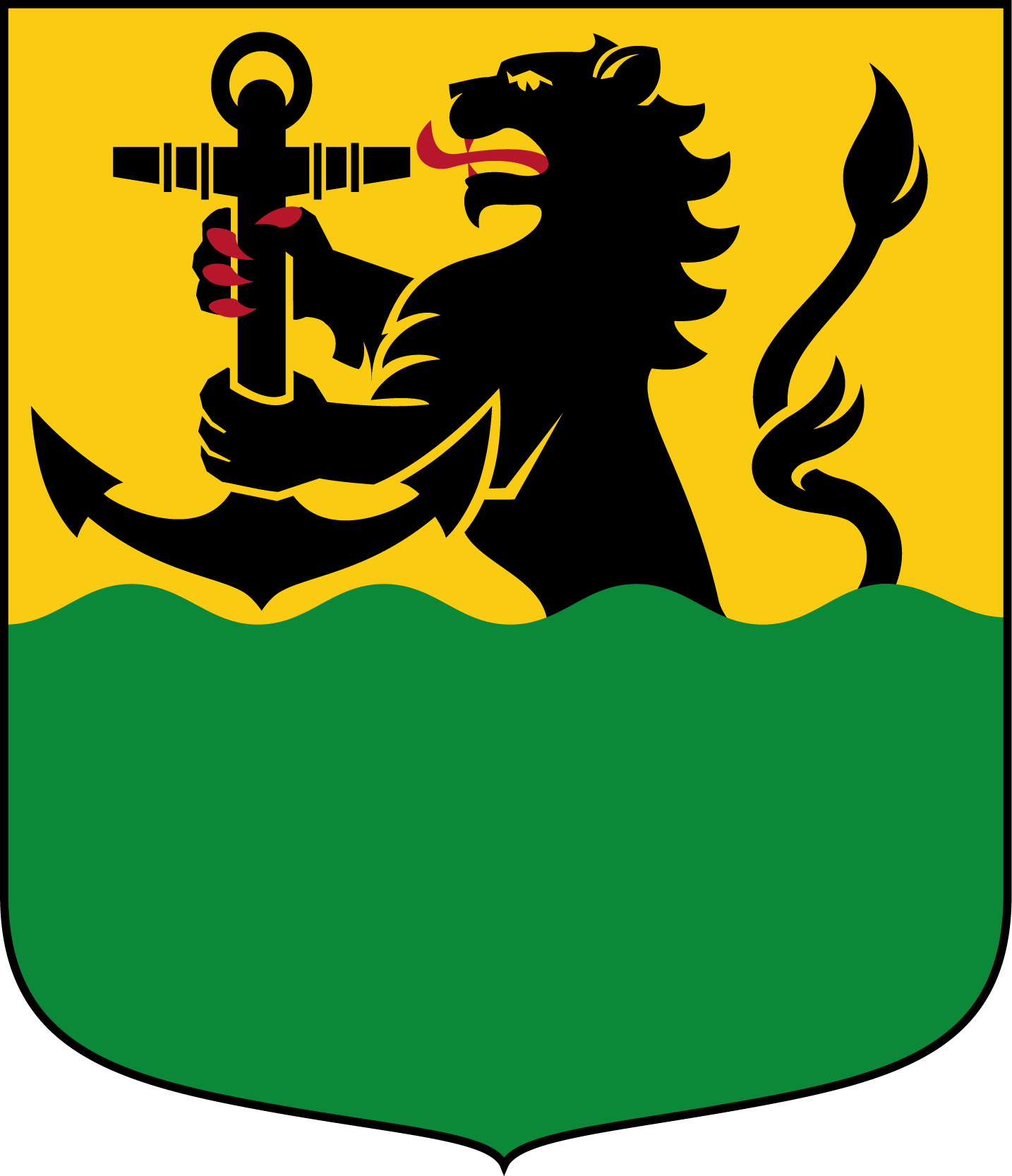
- Flag Coat of arms

- Location within Blekinge Location within Sweden
- Coordinates: 56°10′N 14°51′E
- Country: Sweden
- Province: Blekinge
- County: Blekinge County
- Municipality: Karlshamn Municipality
- Charter: 1664

Area
  - Total: 13.48 km^{2} (5.20 sq mi)

Population (31 December 2010)
  - Total: 19,075
  - Density: 1,415/km^{2} (3,660/sq mi)
- Time zone: UTC+1 (CET)
  - Summer (DST): UTC+2 (CEST)

Karlshamn (Swedish pronunciation: [ˈkɑ̂ːɭshamn]) is a locality and the seat of Karlshamn Municipality in Blekinge County, Sweden. It had 13,576 inhabitants in 2015, out of 31,846 in the municipality.

Karlshamn received a Royal Charter and city privileges in 1664, when King Charles X Gustav, in Swedish Karl, realized the strategic location near the Baltic Sea. In 1666 the town was named Karlshamn, meaning Karl's Port in honour of the Swedish king.

== History ==
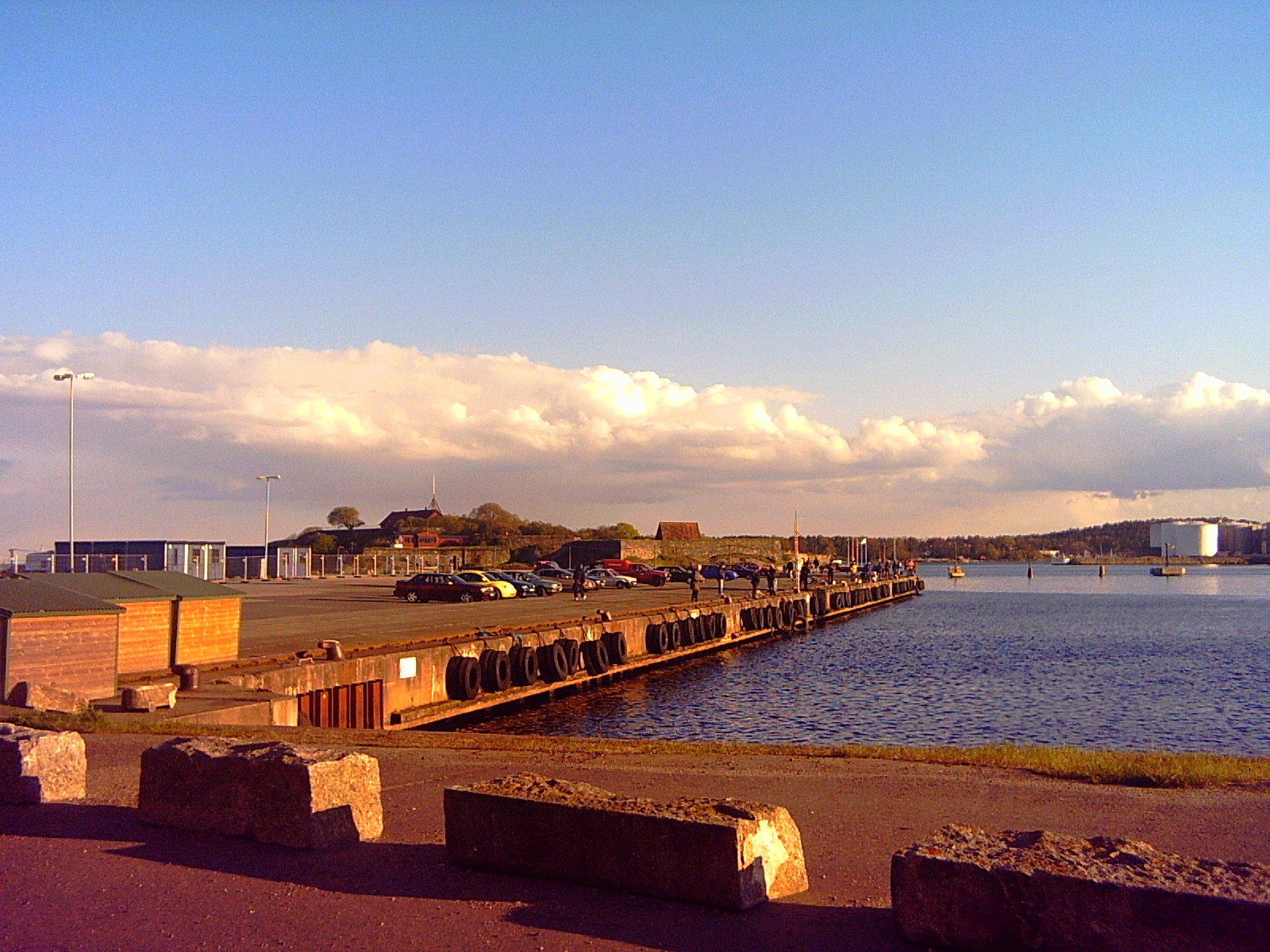
Harbour

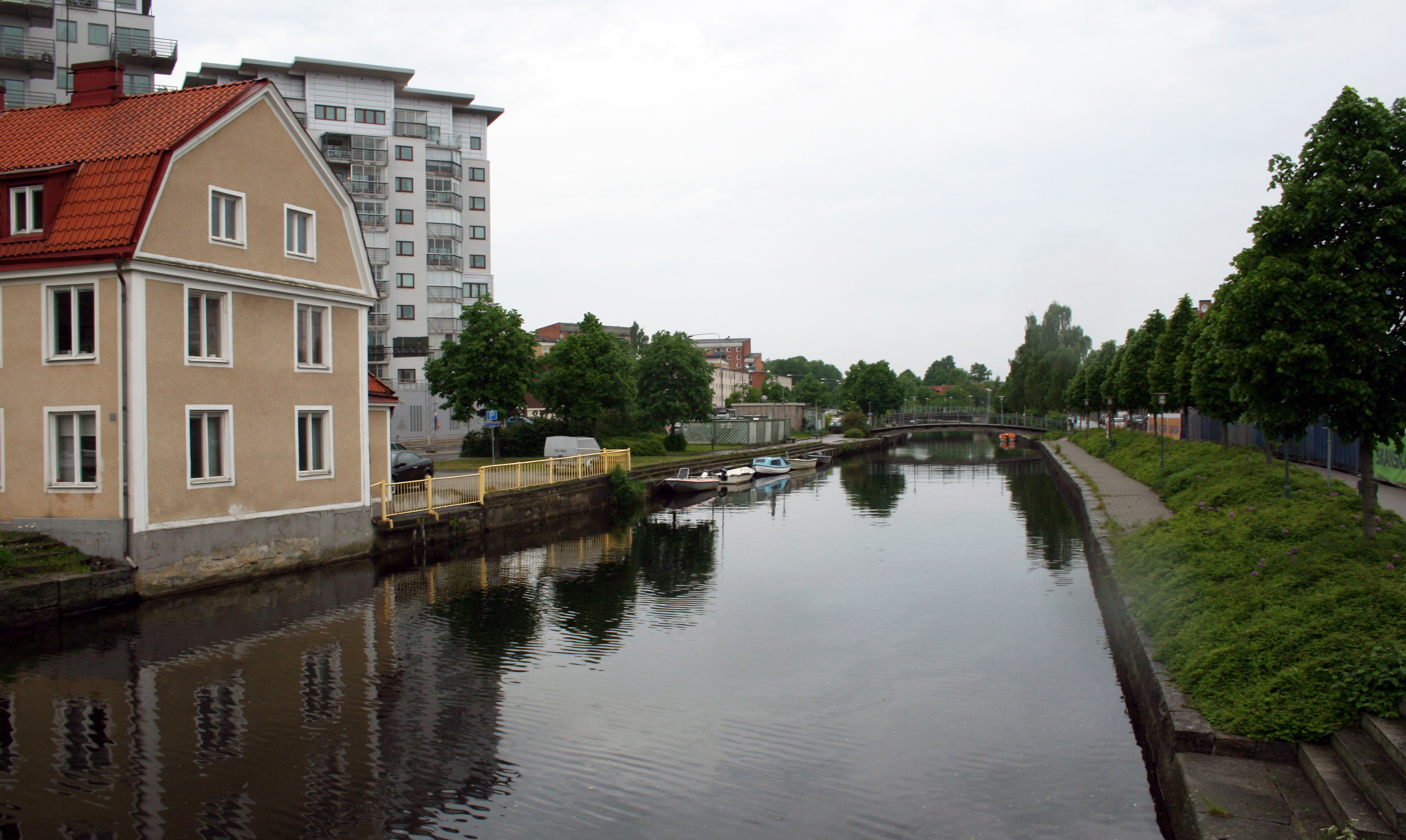
Mieån river

At the outlet of the stream Mieån was found a harbour and fishing village "Bodekull" and a farm "Bodetorp". In the lower parts of "Mörrumsån" was a prosperous salmon fishery.

Sweden gained supremacy over the territory through Treaty of Roskilde 1658. The king Charles X Gustav immediately inspected the coast and found here a tremendously beautiful and incomparable harbour. Fortifications designed by Erik Dahlberg were erected on Boön 1659 and on Friesholmen 1675, called "Kastellet". Troops loyal to the Danish king attacked the town twice in 1676–78. The location attracted foreign merchants and in 1664 royal privileges were issued to establish a town named after the king, meaning "Karl's Port". The settlement expanded rapidly to count 647 citizens in the year 1700. Pestilence reduced the population in 1710.

Industries based on agricultural and mineral products were established during the 18th century. A fire of 1763 destroyed the northern part of the town, another fire ravaged in 1790. The intercontinental war of 1810 gave Karlshamn a rare possibility to trade goods and the citizens prospered. Punch, tobacco and snuff powder were produced in town. Craftsmanship was common until circa 1880, when industrial production took over. The town had 6529 citizens by 1883, the town plan covered 63 hectares and buildings were erected on 693 plots. The railway inaugurated in 1874 connected Karlshamn to Vislanda in the northern province. 1890, the coastal railroad was built. 1876, L.O. Smith established production of aquavit in the town and built a new distillery in 1884 which was effective until 1893, whereafter it was converted into a sugar refinery. In 1912 was established production of vegetable oil in the old refinery, a still continuing operation under the label AAK. Stone cutting in granite quarries was a heavy export industry circa 1850–1940. In Mörrum a paper mill was built in 1962. Since 1975 the port of Karlshamn has gradually transferred its operations to the Stilleryd location, west of town. 1965 was a new hospital building in operation.

Karlshamn is considered to situate in strategically sensitive area, about 50 kilometres from the Swedish main naval base at Karlskrona. Gazprom would lease Karlshamn's port to construct Nord Stream 2 gas pipeline after the national government dropped its objections.

== Climate ==
Karlshamn has an oceanic climate typical of Southern Sweden, with relatively mild winters for the latitude and summers that are relatively warm. It is influenced by its southerly position on the coastline, which causes particularly mild autumn average temperatures as the maritime influence moderates the cooling. The precipitation pattern is highly variable from year to year depending on prevailing wind patterns.

Climate data for Karlshamn 2002–2021 (extremes since 1901)
Month	Jan	Feb	Mar	Apr	May	Jun	Jul	Aug	Sep	Oct	Nov	Dec	Year
Record high °C (°F)	11.6 (52.9)	16.7 (62.1)	20.6 (69.1)	25.5 (77.9)	27.9 (82.2)	32.0 (89.6)	32.0 (89.6)	33.0 (91.4)	27.1 (80.8)	22.1 (71.8)	14.8 (58.6)	12.7 (54.9)	33.0 (91.4)
Mean maximum °C (°F)	8.1 (46.6)	9.5 (49.1)	14.5 (58.1)	19.3 (66.7)	24.5 (76.1)	27.1 (80.8)	28.3 (82.9)	27.1 (80.8)	23.0 (73.4)	17.4 (63.3)	12.6 (54.7)	9.3 (48.7)	29.7 (85.5)
Mean daily maximum °C (°F)	2.8 (37.0)	3.5 (38.3)	7.1 (44.8)	12.2 (54.0)	17.0 (62.6)	20.8 (69.4)	22.7 (72.9)	22.1 (71.8)	18.3 (64.9)	12.4 (54.3)	7.8 (46.0)	4.4 (39.9)	12.6 (54.7)
Daily mean °C (°F)	0.4 (32.7)	0.7 (33.3)	3.1 (37.6)	7.2 (45.0)	11.9 (53.4)	15.8 (60.4)	18.1 (64.6)	17.5 (63.5)	13.9 (57.0)	8.9 (48.0)	5.3 (41.5)	2.2 (36.0)	8.8 (47.8)
Mean daily minimum °C (°F)	−2.0 (28.4)	−2.1 (28.2)	−0.9 (30.4)	2.1 (35.8)	6.7 (44.1)	10.7 (51.3)	13.4 (56.1)	12.9 (55.2)	9.5 (49.1)	5.3 (41.5)	2.7 (36.9)	−0.3 (31.5)	4.8 (40.7)
Mean minimum °C (°F)	−11.8 (10.8)	−10.1 (13.8)	−8.3 (17.1)	−3.5 (25.7)	0.2 (32.4)	5.0 (41.0)	8.6 (47.5)	7.0 (44.6)	2.5 (36.5)	−2.9 (26.8)	−5.8 (21.6)	−9.5 (14.9)	−13.8 (7.2)
Record low °C (°F)	−27.0 (−16.6)	−22.5 (−8.5)	−19.5 (−3.1)	−5.7 (21.7)	−3.3 (26.1)	−1.2 (29.8)	3.0 (37.4)	2.7 (36.9)	−1.8 (28.8)	−8.6 (16.5)	−14.0 (6.8)	−20.7 (−5.3)	−27.0 (−16.6)
Average precipitation mm (inches)	51.8 (2.04)	37.2 (1.46)	36.4 (1.43)	27.0 (1.06)	39.3 (1.55)	57.0 (2.24)	63.8 (2.51)	62.5 (2.46)	40.8 (1.61)	65.3 (2.57)	62.0 (2.44)	56.2 (2.21)	599.3 (23.58)
Source 1: SMHI Open Data for Karlshamn, precipitation
Source 2: SMHI Open Data for Karlshamn, temperature

== Education ==
University
In Karlshamn a branch of the Blekinge Institute of Technology (BTH) was established in 2000. It focuses on media technology, such as digital games, digital visual production, digital audio production and interactions with web technologies.
Secondary Schools
The upper secondary school (grade 10 to 13) is Väggaskolan in Karlshamn. There are many primary schools (grade 0-9) in the boroughs.

== Culture ==
=== Performing arts ===
The theatre association is named "Teatersmedjan" and draws members from all ages, although the youth dominates. They have rehearsal and venues in a converted locomotive workshop called "Lokstallarna", this is also the venue for young musical bands - "Musikforum", which was saved economically by the music producer Johan "Shellback" Schuster, who comes from Karlshamn, in 2014. There are several vocal choirs. The most notable secular choirs are "Karlshamn Chamber Choir" and "ABF-kören". The parishes also have choirs. Classical music is performed by "Karlshamns musiksällskap". "Karlshamns musikkår" is a concert band of wind instruments marching through the city center regularly during the summer season. The jazz association "Munthe" invites musicians to play on restaurant "Gourmet Grön". A musical outdoor fair "Östersjöfestivalen" is held in the town centre the third week of July each summer. There is a municipal music school.

=== Media ===
"Karlshamns Allehanda" is the name of the daily newspaper founded in the 19th century and since 2003 merged with the regional daily "Blekinge Läns Tidning", owned by "Gota media". The second newspaper covering the region is "Sydöstran". Radio and television has local agencies in the county main town Karlskrona.

Karlshamn is the port where Karl Oskar and Kristina Nilsson and their family departed for America in 1850 in the well-known historical novel The Emigrants by Vilhelm Moberg.

== Townplan and architecture ==
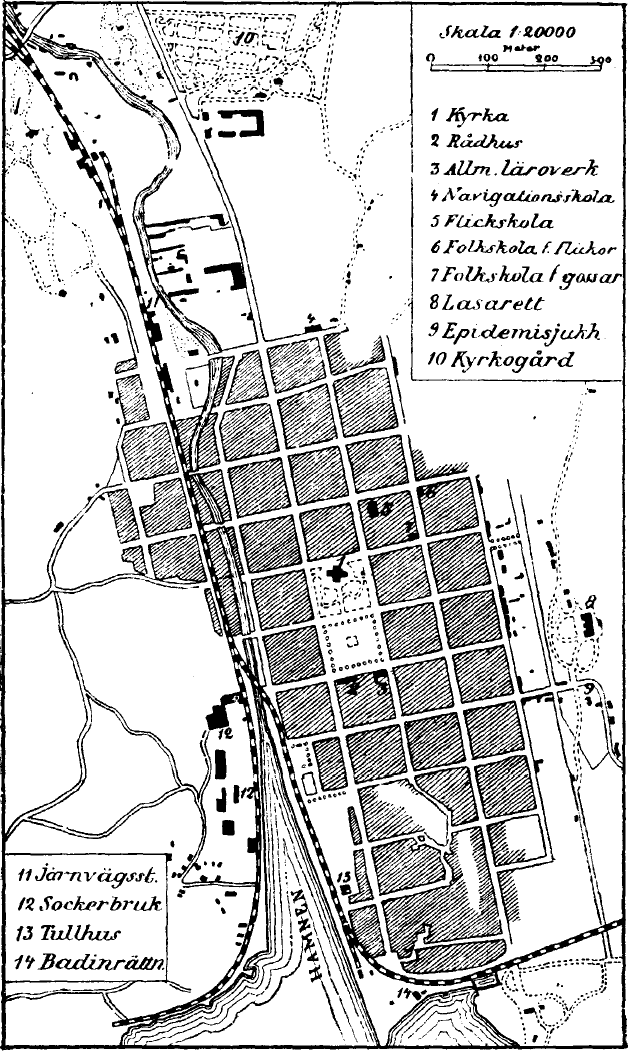
Old map of Karlshamn

The settlement of Bodekull naturally took place on the flat area between the steep rocks east and west of town. The designer of the regular town plan for Karlshamn from 1666 is not known. This first map "Regulierung der Gassen in Bodekulla" shows 24 rectangular blocks of which one is open as a square. The main street "Drottninggatan" is parallel to the river and linear with the navigable inlet to the inner harbour. The grid expanded gradually during the 18th and 19th centuries. Later the town expanded over the meadows and hills to merge with the adjacent Asarum, a rural village north of town. Two old houses remain from the founding time at the square, one is "Asschierska huset" erected as town hall in 1682. The streets of the town was orderly lined with one-two storey buildings, generally a block was subdivided into ten lots on more posh streets and even smaller subdivisions in poorer parts of the town. The church was erected north of the square 1680–1702, the drawing being approved by Erik Dahlbergh. The separate belltower is from 1792. "Skottsbergska gården" is a courtyard shaped by a complete set of merchant buildings from 1766 open to visitors. During the early 19th century the merchants of the town experienced a boom which materialised in added storeys and more decorations on the facades. At the end of this century and the following years some public buildings were erected: the school at the southeast corner of the square inaugurated 1864, the girls school 1879 (now parish's meeting rooms) the navigation school 1863 (demolished), the hospital erected 1883 (now partly police post and music school) the Bodestorp folk school 1909, the "realskola" designed 1912-17 by architect Gunnar Asplund and his 1929 addition in modernist/"functionalist" style. 1900 the town hall eas erected south of the square replacing a wooden building. It was substantially expanded in 1990-95 by a series of additional buildings designed by Nyréns architects.

== Buildings and structures ==
Near Karlshamn, in the village of Gungvala, you can find Gungvalamasten, a 335-metre-tall (1,099 ft) guyed mast for FM and TV transmission. It is together with three other guyed masts, of same height, the tallest structure in Sweden. At Karlshamn, there is Stärnö Power Station with its three chimneys and the static inverter of HVDC SwePol, the power cable to Poland.

== Tourism ==
Karlshamn attracts visitors to the salmon fisheries in "Mörrumsån", to the rocky coastline and the Hällaryd archipelago and to the wooded hinterland. East of the city centre the famous Eriksbergs Viltpark is located. It is an old farmstead with surrounding land now host to a variety of native animals such as European Bison, Crown Deer, Moose and wild boar amongst others. Tourism peaks in June–August, when there is regular boat connection and accommodation service to islands like Tärnö.

== Sports ==
The following sports clubs are located in Karlshamn:

- IFK Karlshamn - football
- Högadals IS - football
- CI85 - floorball
- Karlshamns HF - handball

== Transport ==
=== Road ===
The bikepath network of Karlshamn is gradually expanding, connecting the localities Mörrum-Svängsta-Asarum-Karlshamn. The road network is mostly covered by tarmac. The European trunk road E22 transverses the municipality, and the national road 29 connects the port to the province Småland in the north.

=== Rail ===
The railroad "Blekinge kustbana", electrified in 2006, connects the towns of the region with trains every hour.

=== Port ===
The port in Stilleryd is number six in Sweden as related to tonnes of cargo, is the largest and deepest in southeast Sweden and has a regular ferry service with Klaipėda in Lithuania.

== Notable people from Karlshamn ==
- Christopher Schröder (1628–1699), mayor of Karlshamn
- Alice Tegnér (1864–1943), songwriter
- Lars Olsson Smith (1836–1913), industrialist
- Janne M. Sjödahl (1853–1939), author
- Ida Schmidt (1857–1932, women's rights activist, educator, politician
- Bengt Berg (1885–1967), ornithologist, author, photographer
- Git Gay (1921–2007), cabaret performer
- Per Ragnar (born 1941), actor
- Per Svensson (born 1965), actor
- Ola Lindholm (born 1970), TV host
- Johan Petersson (born 1973), handball player
- Bingo Rimér (born 1975), photographer
- Emma Igelström (born 1980), champion swimmer
- Blinded Colony, metal band established 2000
- Shellback (real name Johan Schuster, born 1985), songwriter, music producer and musician
