= Johannishus Castle =

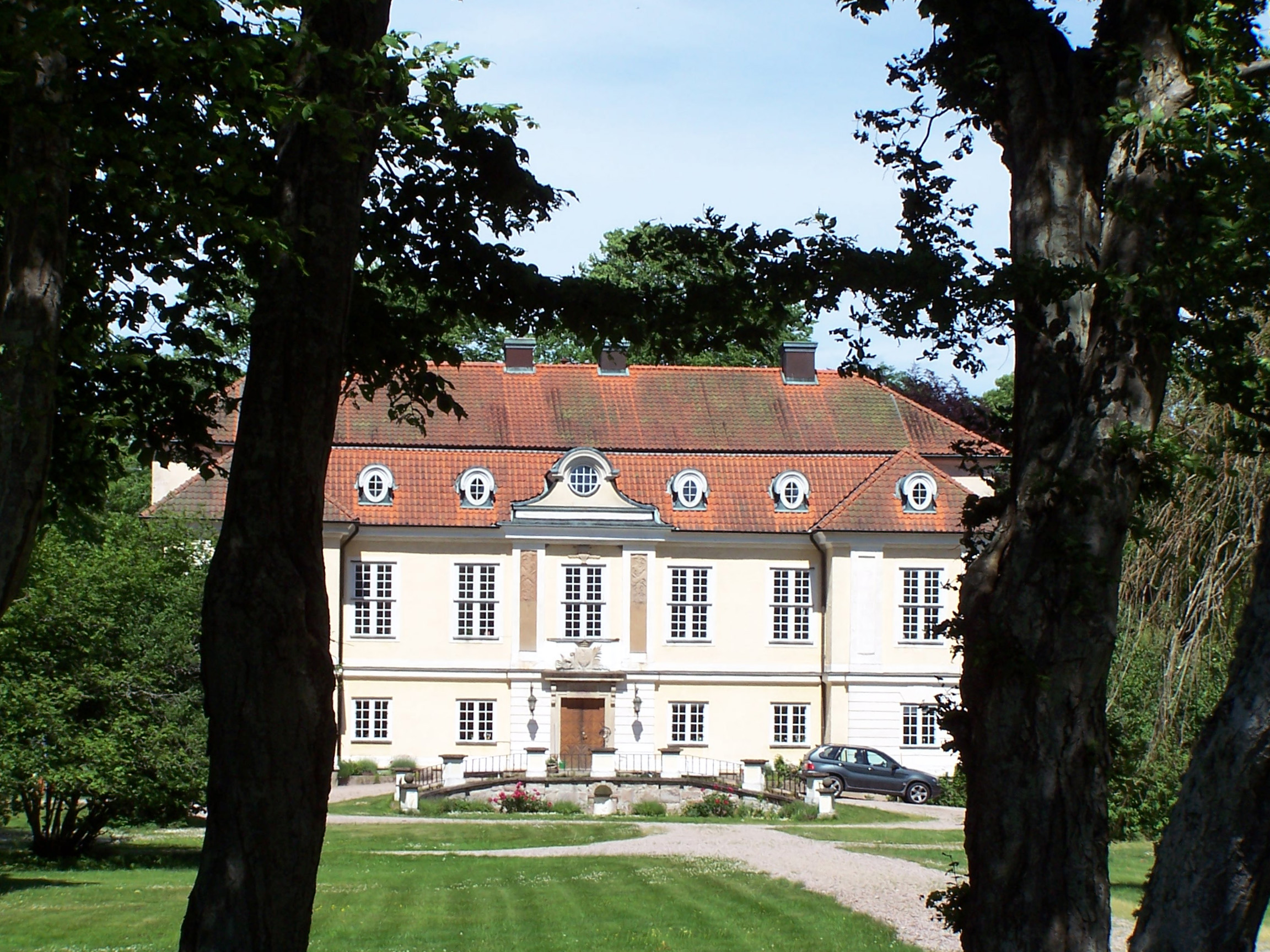
- Interactive map of the Johannishus Castle area

General information
- Location: Ronneby Municipality, Sweden

Johannishus Castle (Swedish: Johannishus slott) is a castlelike manor house in Ronneby Municipality, Blekinge County, Sweden. The town of Johannishus is located a few kilometers south of the estate.

== History ==
The manor was founded around 1670-1680 by Hans Wachtmeister (1641-1714), Admiral general of the Swedish Royal Navy. The main building was completed in 1779 under the ownership of Count Fredrik Georg Hans Carl Wachtmeister (1720–1792). It was designed by architect Carl Fredric Adelcrantz (1716-1796). The estate has belonged to the Wachtmeister family for eleven generations. The estate is now managed by Johannishus Gods which conducts forestry, agriculture and game management on the property.

== See also ==
- List of castles in Sweden
