= Mörrumsån =

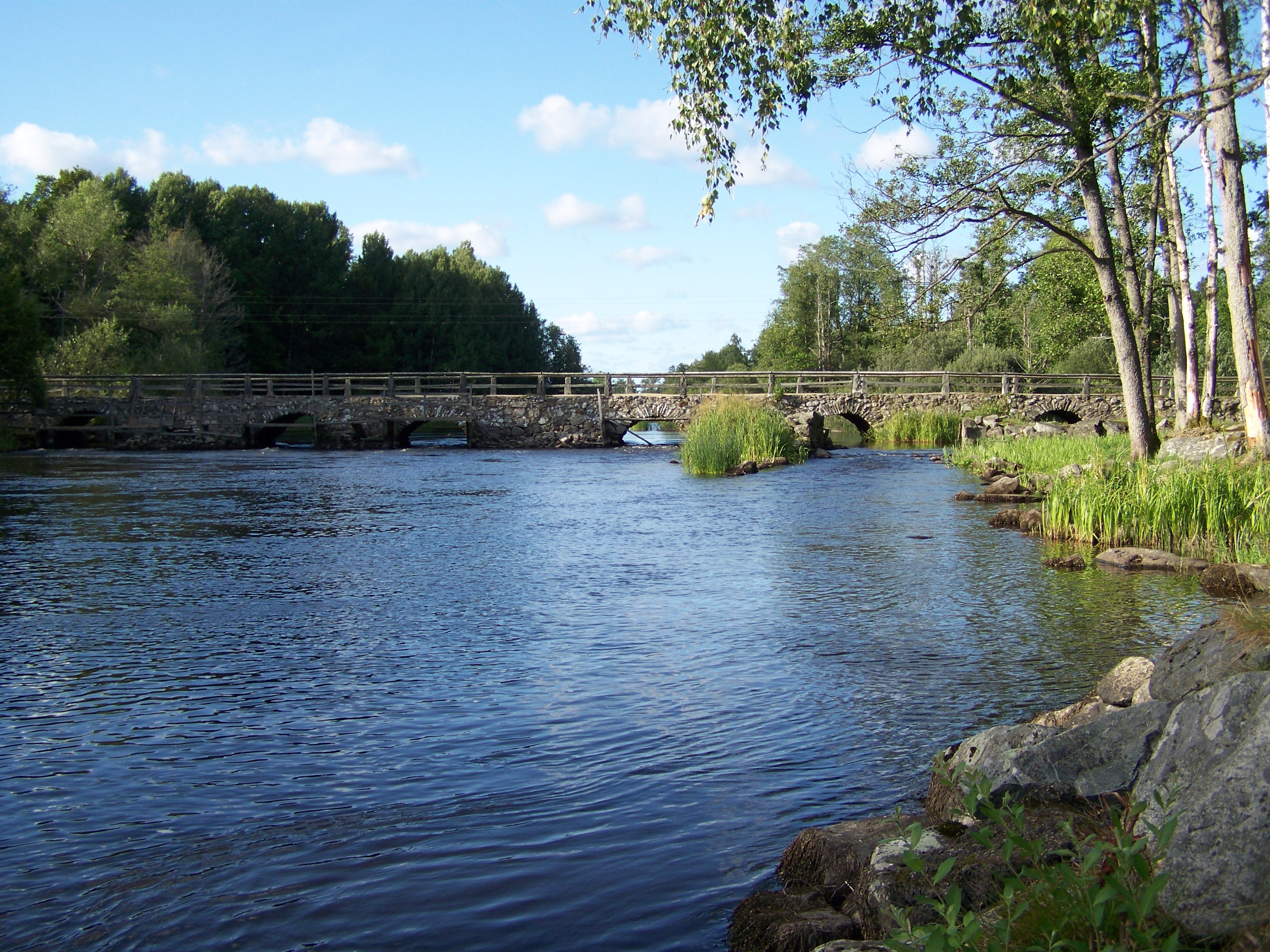
- Mörrumsån (Blidingsholm)

Location
- Country: Sweden

Physical characteristics
- Mouth: Baltic Sea
  - location: Mörrum, Blekinge, Sweden
  - coordinates: 56°09′15″N 14°44′50″E
  - elevation: 0 m (0 ft)
- Length: 175 km (109 mi)
- Basin size: 3,369.1 km^{2} (1,300.8 sq mi)
- Discharge
  - average: 27 m^{3}/s (950 cu ft/s)

Basin features
- Designation

Ramsar Wetland
- Official name: Mörrumsån-Pukavik
- Designated: 14 November 2001
- Reference no.: 1123

Mörrumsån is a river in Blekinge County and Kronoberg County, Sweden. It is roughly 185 km (115 mi) long, with its tributary in the lake Asnen, from which it flows south, into the Baltic Sea. The river is known among fishing enthusiasts around the world, because of the salmon fishing that is considered to be among the best in Sweden. The most prominent villages where the river flows through are Mörrum and Svängsta, both located in Karlshamn Municipality.
