= 2010 Blekinge county election =

Regional council election in Blekinge County, Sweden

Blekinge County in Sweden held a county council election on 19 September 2010 on the same day as the general and municipal elections.

== Results ==
There were 47 seats, the same number as in 2006. The Social Democrats won the most seats at 20, a loss of one seat. The party received 38.9% of a valid vote of 98,646.

| Party | Votes | % | Seats | ± |
|---|---|---|---|---|
| Social Democrats | 38,416 | 38.9 | 20 | -1 |
| Moderates | 23,069 | 23.4 | 10 | 0 |
| Sweden Democrats | 8,405 | 8.5 | 5 | +2 |
| Centre Party | 6,593 | 6.7 | 3 | -1 |
| People's Party | 5,692 | 5.8 | 3 | 0 |
| Left Party | 5,299 | 5.4 | 2 | 0 |
| Green Party | 4,593 | 4.7 | 2 | 0 |
| Christian Democrats | 3,529 | 3.6 | 2 | 0 |
| Others | 3,050 | 3.1 | 0 | 0 |
| Invalid/blank votes | 2,007 | | | |
| Total | 100,653 | 100 | 47 | 0 |
Source:val.se

== Municipal results ==
| Location | Turnout | Share | Votes | S | M | SD | C | FP | V | MP | KD | Other |
|---|---|---|---|---|---|---|---|---|---|---|---|---|
| Karlshamn | 82.1 | 20.5 | 20,229 | 37.6 | 20.0 | 6.9 | 6.7 | 5.1 | 5.8 | 6.2 | 2.8 | 8.8 |
| Karlskrona | 84.4 | 41.5 | 40,942 | 38.7 | 25.7 | 8.7 | 5.7 | 7.5 | 4.5 | 4.8 | 3.8 | 0.6 |
| Olofström | 78.3 | 8.3 | 8,225 | 49.9 | 12.5 | 7.5 | 6.6 | 3.1 | 6.2 | 2.6 | 7.0 | 4.6 |
| Ronneby | 83.0 | 18.6 | 18,315 | 36.3 | 24.0 | 9.2 | 10.0 | 5.0 | 6.5 | 4.4 | 2.8 | 1.8 |
| Sölvesborg | 82.2 | 11.1 | 10,935 | 38.5 | 28.2 | 10.3 | 4.9 | 3.5 | 5.3 | 3.3 | 3.1 | 3.0 |
| Total | 82.9 | 100.0 | 98,646 | 38.9 | 23.4 | 8.5 | 6.7 | 5.8 | 5.4 | 4.7 | 3.6 | 3.1 |
Source: val.se
