= Matvik =

Harbor in Sweden

Coordinates: 56°10′04″N 14°58′06″E

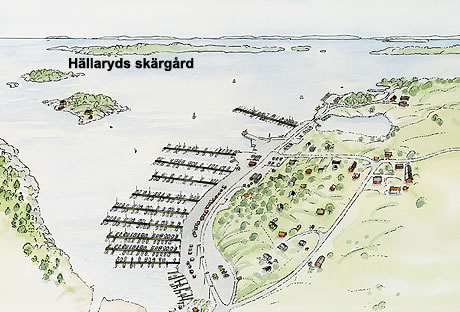
Overview of Matvik harbor

Matvik is a small harbor in Karlshamn Municipality in southeastern Sweden. It is used for ferry services into the Hällaryd, or Karlshamn, archipelago out south to Tärnö, its biggest island. Matvik is also the largest harbor for private vessels in Karlshamn Municipality with some 600 slots.
