= Torarp =

- Location within Blekinge Location within Sweden
- Coordinates: 56°13′N 14°48′E
- Country: Sweden
- Province: Blekinge
- County: Blekinge County
- Municipality: Karlshamn Municipality

Area
  - Total: 0.79 km^{2} (0.31 sq mi)

Population (31 December 2010)
  - Total: 263
  - Density: 332/km^{2} (860/sq mi)
- Time zone: UTC+1 (CET)
  - Summer (DST): UTC+2 (CEST)

Torarp is situated in Karlshamn Municipality, Blekinge County, Sweden with 263 inhabitants as of 2010.
