= Hallabro =

- Location within Blekinge Location within Sweden
- Coordinates: 56°23′N 15°06′E
- Country: Sweden
- Province: Blekinge
- County: Blekinge County
- Municipality: Ronneby Municipality

Area
  - Total: 0.49 km^{2} (0.19 sq mi)

Population (31 December 2010)
  - Total: 254
  - Density: 520/km^{2} (1,300/sq mi)
- Time zone: UTC+1 (CET)
  - Summer (DST): UTC+2 (CEST)

Hallabro is a locality situated in Ronneby Municipality, Blekinge County, Sweden with 254 inhabitants in 2010.
