= Trolleboda =

- Village
- Location in Blekinge County
- Coordinates: 56°9′30″N 15°10′30″E
- Country: Sweden
- County: Blekinge County
- Municipality: Ronneby Municipality
- Time zone: UTC+1 (CET)
  - Summer (DST): UTC+2 (CEST)

Trolleboda is a village in Ronneby Municipality, Blekinge County, southeastern Sweden. It contains a 17th-century windmill.
