= Åryd =

Åryd may refer to:

- Åryd, Karlshamn Municipality, a village in Karlshamn Municipality, Sweden
- Åryd, Växjö Municipality, a village in Växjö Municipality, Sweden
