= Bräkne =

Bräkne can refer to:

- Bräkne Hundred - a hundred of Blekinge in Sweden
- Bräkne-Hoby Parish - a parish in Bräkne Hundred
