= Backaryd =

- Location within Blekinge Location within Sweden
- Coordinates: 56°20′N 15°11′E
- Country: Sweden
- Province: Blekinge
- County: Blekinge County
- Municipality: Ronneby Municipality

Area
  - Total: 0.67 km^{2} (0.26 sq mi)

Population (31 December 2010)
  - Total: 365
  - Density: 545/km^{2} (1,410/sq mi)
- Time zone: UTC+1 (CET)
  - Summer (DST): UTC+2 (CEST)

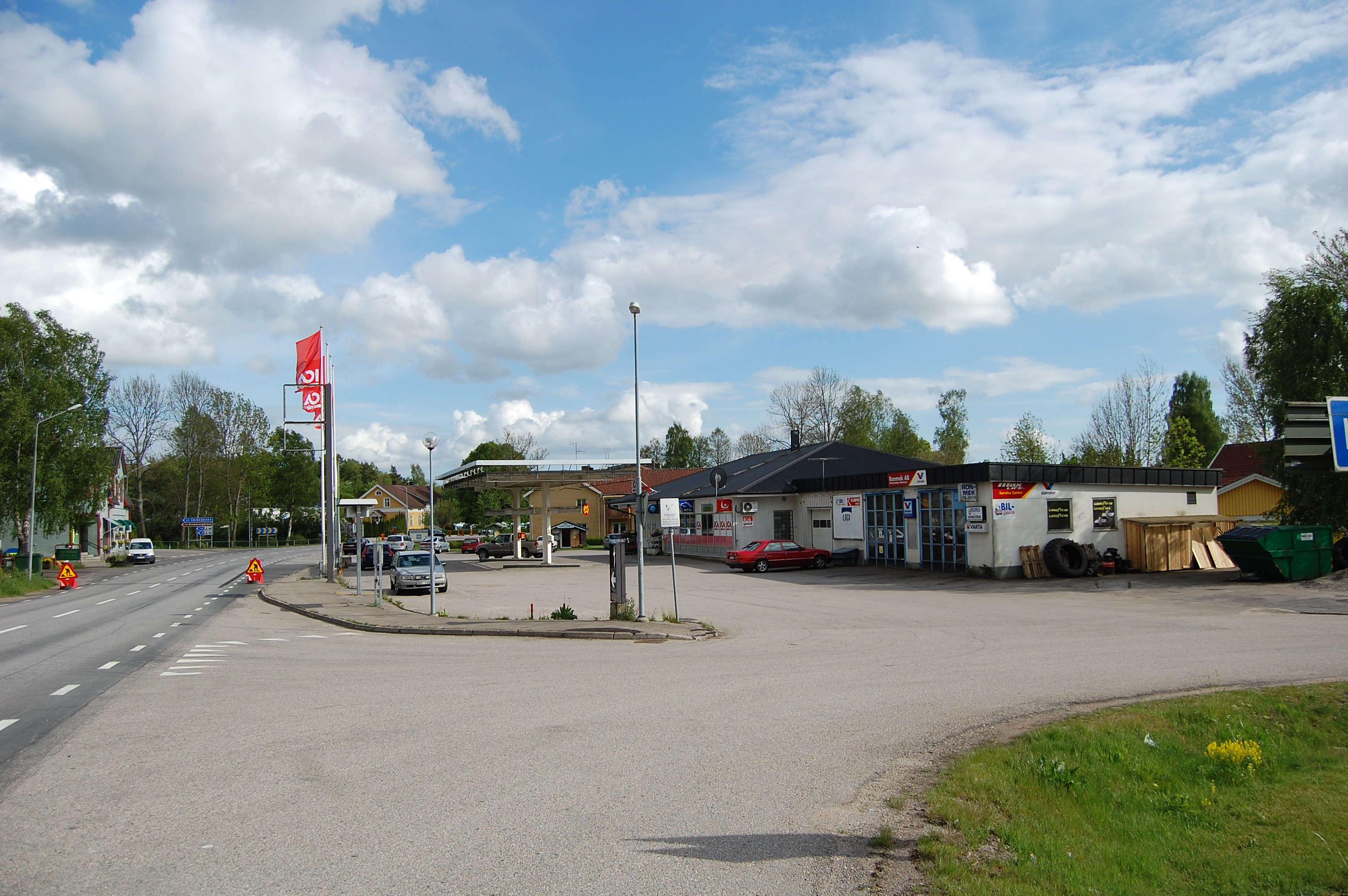
Backaryd, Ronneby Municipality

Backaryd is a locality situated in Ronneby Municipality, Blekinge County, Sweden with 365 inhabitants in 2010.
