= Ronnebyhamn =

- Location within Blekinge Location within Sweden
- Coordinates: 56°11′N 15°18′E
- Country: Sweden
- Province: Blekinge
- County: Blekinge County
- Municipality: Ronneby Municipality

Area
  - Total: 1.30 km^{2} (0.50 sq mi)

Population (31 December 2010)
  - Total: 537
  - Density: 413/km^{2} (1,070/sq mi)
- Time zone: UTC+1 (CET)
  - Summer (DST): UTC+2 (CEST)

Ronnebyhamn is a locality situated in Ronneby Municipality, Blekinge County, Sweden with 537 inhabitants in 2010.
