= Marks-Roos =

Named after its legislative sponsors, the Marks-Roos Local Bond Pooling Act (California Government Code §6584-6599.1) is a law enacted by the California Legislature in 1985. The main purpose of this statute is to allow local California governments to work together to get financing in a way that will conceivably lower borrowing costs. Underlying this concept is the belief that money can be saved through economies of scale by selling one large bond issue to finance several small projects. Through this legislation, local municipalities and other political subdivisions can join together by signing a Joint Powers Agreement, which creates a Joint Powers Authority ("JPA"). In its broadest terms, the Marks-Roos Act authorizes JPAs to issue Marks-Roos bonds and loan the proceeds to local governmental agencies and non-profit corporations to finance public capital improvements, working capital or insurance programs. Alternatively, JPAs can purchase the bonds of local agencies with the proceeds of Marks-Roos bonds. Marks-Roos bonds do not require voter approval. Instead they are approved by resolution of the JPAs. However, there is a requirement for the JPA to make the finding that the financing would result in significant public benefit prior to bond.

== Background ==
In 1978 Californians enacted Proposition 13, which limited the ability of local public agencies to increase property taxes based on a property’s assessed value. This change in law, combined with sharp cuts in federal aid to state and local governments, severely limited local government’s ability to fund public infrastructure. The Marks-Roos Bond Pooling Act was thus created with the intent of providing a flexible alternative method of financing needed improvements, along with the benefit of reduced borrowing costs through the use of bond pools.
