= Åsnen =

Lake in Kronoberg County, Sweden

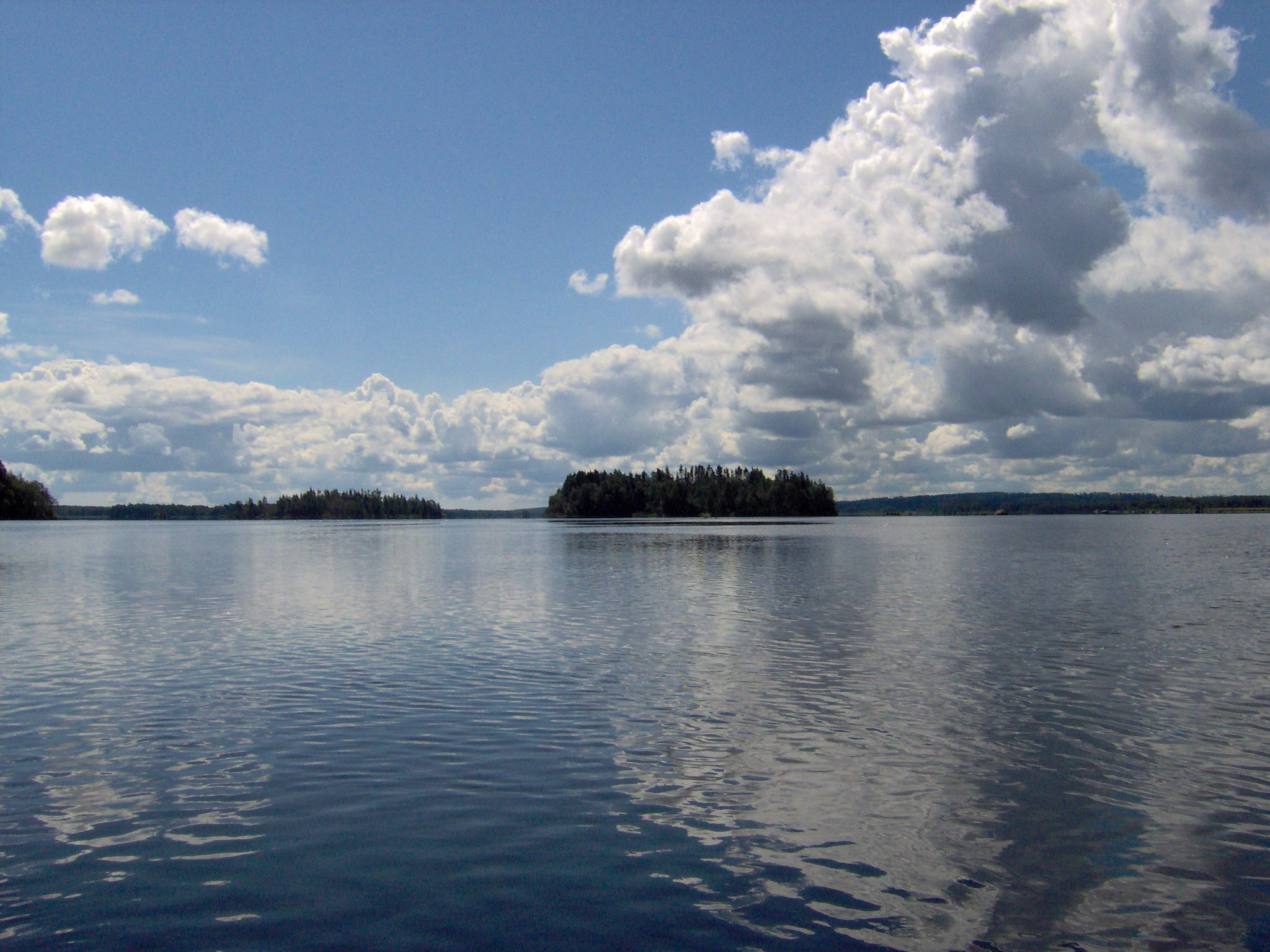

- Location within Kronoberg Location within Sweden
- Location: Småland
- Coordinates: 56°38′N 14°44′E
- Primary outflows: Mörrumsån
- Basin countries: Sweden
- Surface area: 147.5 km^{2} (57.0 sq mi)
- Average depth: 3.1 m (10 ft)
- Max. depth: 14.2 m (47 ft)
- Water volume: 459,500,000 m^{3} (1.623×10^{10} cu ft)
- Surface elevation: 138 m (453 ft)

Ramsar Wetland
- Official name: Åsnen
- Designated: 12 June 1989
- Reference no.: 429

Åsnen (Swedish pronunciation: [ˈôːsnɛn]) is a large lake in southern Småland, Sweden, roughly 150 km^{2} in size. The river Mörrumsån flows south from Åsnen into the Baltic Sea. The lake lies south of Alvesta and Växjö and northwest of Tingsryd and is the third-largest lake in Småland, after Vättern and Bolmen. Approximately 19 km^{2} of the lake's area is occupied by small islands. Åsnen has many small bays and islands, the largest of which is Sirkön. The lake has been designated as a Ramsar site since 1989. The lake is home to Åsnen National Park, established in 2018.

Fruit (mainly apples and strawberries) is grown in the southern parts of the surrounding area, including on Sirkön.

== Activities ==
Åsnen is well known for its richness in native fish, and is a popular attraction for anglers. The most common types of fish are pikeperch, pickerel, perch, and eels.

The lake is also a popular destination for boating and canoeing, with camping areas along the lake shore.
