= Johannishus =

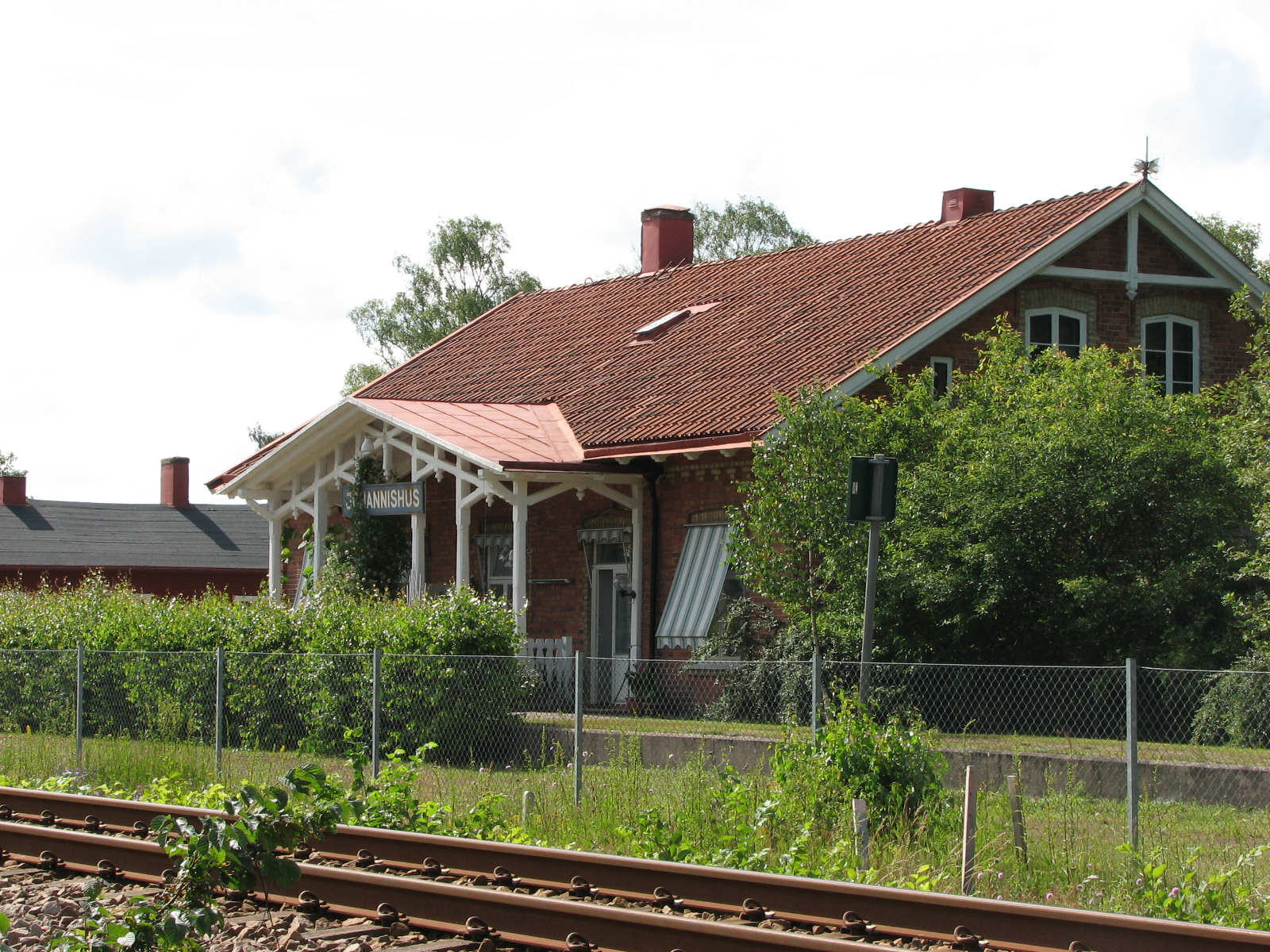
- Johannishus former railway station

- Location within Blekinge Location within Sweden
- Coordinates: 56°13′N 15°25′E
- Country: Sweden
- Province: Blekinge
- County: Blekinge County
- Municipality: Ronneby Municipality

Area
  - Total: 0.96 km^{2} (0.37 sq mi)

Population (31 December 2010)
  - Total: 748
  - Density: 780/km^{2} (2,000/sq mi)
- Time zone: UTC+1 (CET)
  - Summer (DST): UTC+2 (CEST)

Johannishus is a locality situated in Ronneby Municipality, Blekinge County, Sweden with 748 inhabitants in 2010. Johannishus castle is situated some kilometers north of locality. There exist a school for 150 pupils and a library.

The locality is also seat of the Hjortsberga natur-& kulturförening (Hjortsberga nature and culture club). The club is recording and publishing information on the history of the localities Hjortsberga, Johannishus, Edestad, Förkärla and Listerby.
