= Svängsta IF =

Swedish football club

- Full name: Svängsta Idrottsförening
- Nickname: SIF
- Ground: Marieborg; Svängsta; Sweden
- Head coach: Magnus Wedin
- Coach: Niclas Olsson
- League: Division 4 Blekinge
Home colours

Svängsta IF is a Swedish football club located in Svängsta.

== Background ==
Svängsta IF currently plays in Division 4 Blekinge which is the sixth tier of Swedish football. They play their home matches at the Marieborg in Svängsta.

The club is affiliated to Blekinge Fotbollförbund. Svängsta IF have competed in the Svenska Cupen on 2 occasions.

== Season to season ==
Season	Level	Division	Section	Position	Movements
2006*	Tier 6	Division 4	Blekinge	11th	Relegation Playoffs – Relegated
2007	Tier 7	Division 5	Blekinge	5th	
2008	Tier 7	Division 5	Blekinge	1st	Promoted
2009	Tier 6	Division 4	Blekinge	13th	Relegated
2010	Tier 7	Division 5	Blekinge	1st	Promoted
2011	Tier 6	Division 4	Blekinge	4th	

* League restructuring in 2006 resulted in a new division being created at Tier 3 and subsequent divisions dropping a level.
