= Ida Schmidt =

Politician, women's rights activist

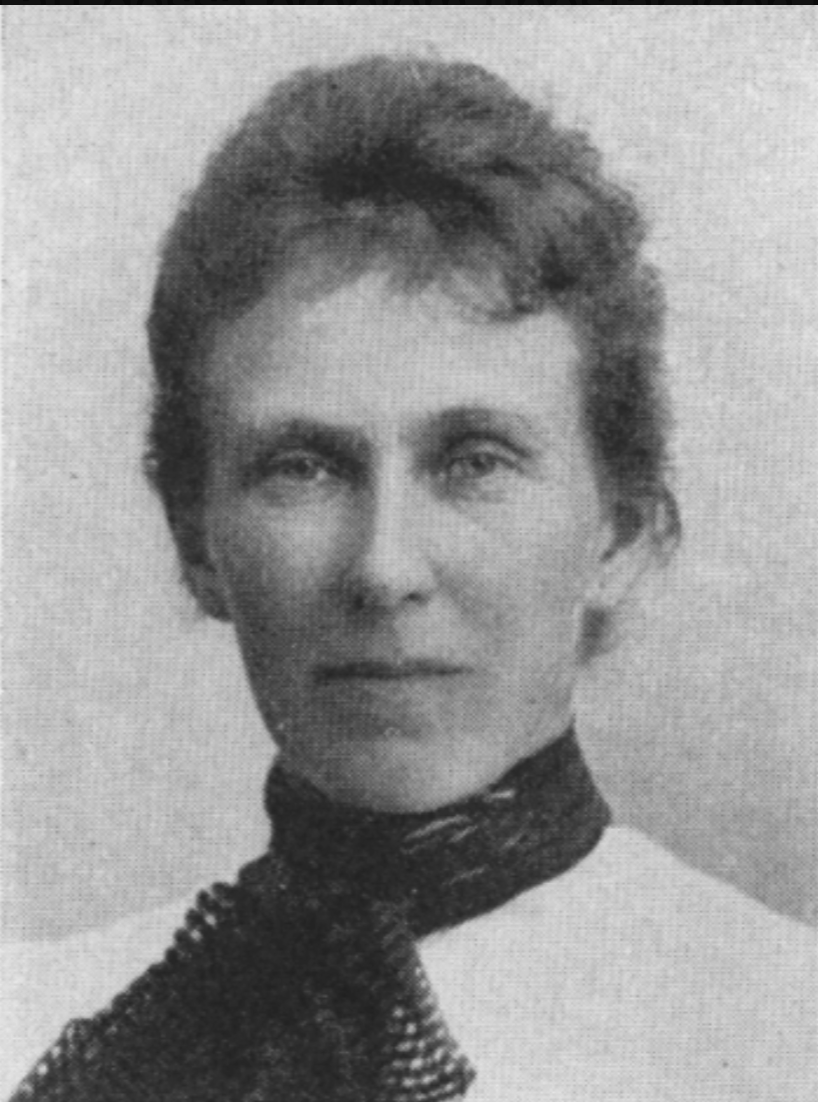
- Born: Ida Carolina Schmidt; 19 September 1857; Karlshamn, Sweden
- Died: 27 December 1932 (aged 75); Karlshamn, Sweden
- Burial place: Hvilan cemetery
- Occupations: Business owner, city council member
- Parents: Herman Schmidt (father); Carolina Böös (mother)

Ida Schmidt (1857-1932) was a Swedish women's rights activist, and she founded one of the first gardening schools for women in the country. In 1910, the first year that women were allowed to run for municipal office, she was one of Sweden's first females elected to the city council.

== Biography ==
Schmidt was born 19 September 1857 in Karlshamn, Sweden into a well-to-do family. Her father was Herman Schmidt and her mother was Carolina Schmidt, born Böös.

=== Educator ===
Schmidt had received training in gardening in Germany, Denmark and Finland. For instance, she visited Heyl's garden school in Charlottenburg, Germany in 1892. In 1896-1897 she studied at Norrviken's garden school at Bråviken in Östergötland, led by Rudolf Abelin, and at Roskilde garden school in Denmark.

In 1900, with her friend Sigrid Hård, she started a garden school called Agdatorp in Blekinge, that could accommodate 14–16 students per year. It was one of the first educational institutions to offer garden training to women in Sweden. Every year, from one to four students were admitted free of charge using funds provided by the county. In several garden exhibitions, the school won prizes in competition. By the time the school closed in 1910 because of financial difficulties, 132 students had studied there over ten years.

=== Changing attitudes toward women ===
According to Inger, the establishment of a gardening school for women was not without controversy, sometimes because of the awkward design of women's skirts.

Opinions on whether women belonged in the gardening profession or did not varied over time. During the 19th century, there were a few articles that were critical of women, perhaps because women were not many. During the first decades of the 20th century, the number of female garden educational institutions increased and thus also the negative articles. How the women were portrayed differs between different newspapers and the editor's attitude prevailed to a great extent. The most negative articles can be found in Svensk trädgårdstidning, a body for the Swedish Association of Conditioned Gardeners. In, for example, the General Swedish garden newspaper, on the other hand, there were more and more pictures of women in practical work clothes in the process of carrying out heavier work.

=== Activist ===
While she was running the garden school, Schmidt became involved in the Association for Women's Political Voting Rights (FKPR, the local branch of the National Association for Women's Political Voting Rights, LKPR). She was named its chairman in 1905.

In 1910, the first year that women were allowed to run for office, Schmidt was elected to the Karlshamn City Council for the Liberals. In 1914, she became one of the first women on the pension board, as a new law concerning municipal pension boards had been enacted that year, which allowed her to run.

In addition, she worked for the Red Cross's local branch in the city and was its secretary beginning in 1914 with the start of World War I, and continuing through 1927.

Schmidt died at 75 in Karlshamn on 27 December 1932 and is buried in the city's Hvilan cemetery.
