= Svängsta =

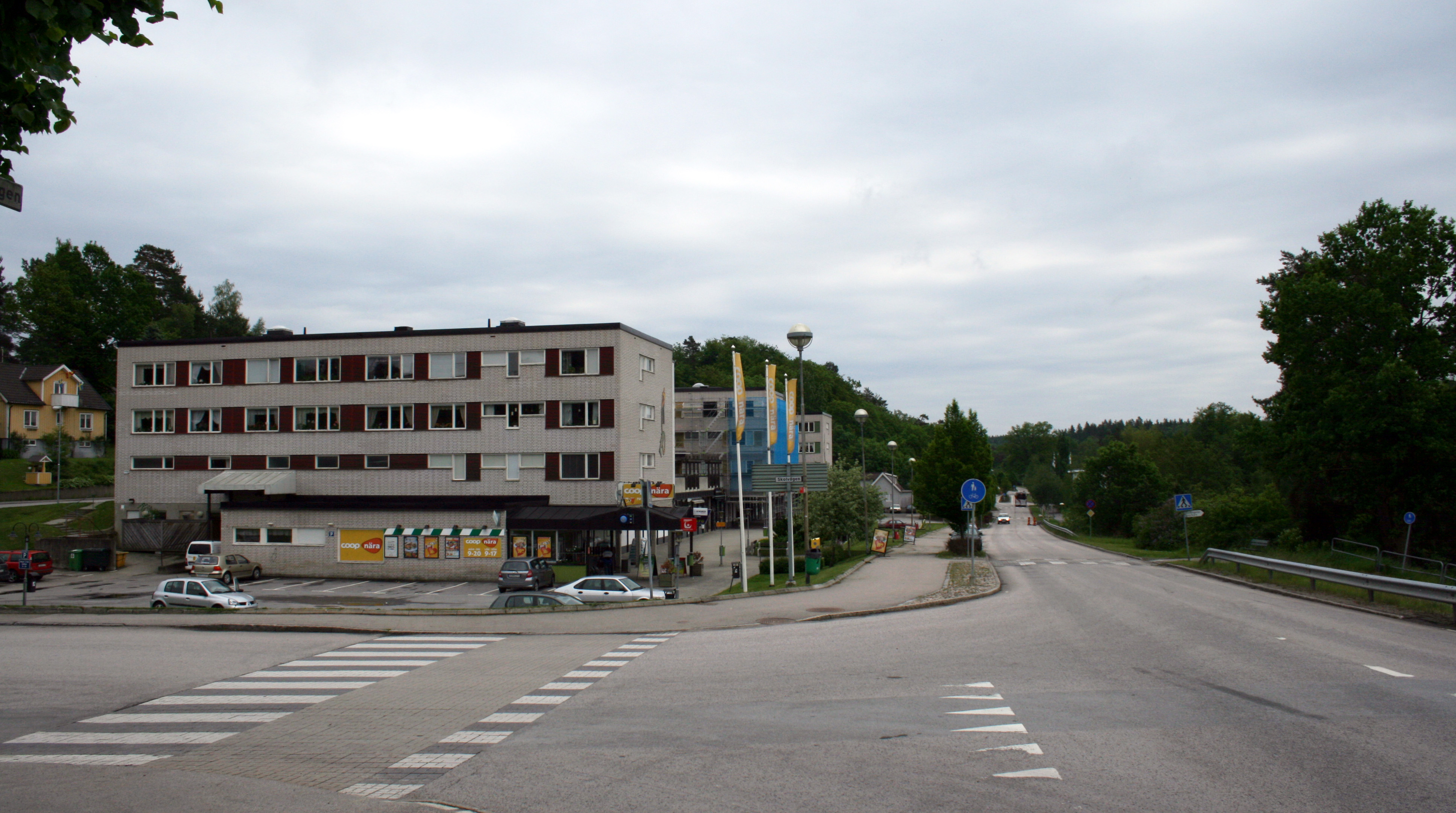

- Location within Blekinge Location within Sweden
- Coordinates: 56°16′N 14°46′E
- Country: Sweden
- Province: Blekinge
- County: Blekinge County
- Municipality: Karlshamn Municipality

Area
  - Total: 2.26 km^{2} (0.87 sq mi)

Population (31 December 2010)
  - Total: 1,682
  - Density: 746/km^{2} (1,930/sq mi)
- Time zone: UTC+1 (CET)
  - Summer (DST): UTC+2 (CEST)

Svängsta is a locality situated in Karlshamn Municipality, Blekinge County, Sweden with 1,682 inhabitants in 2010. It is around 12 km north-west of Karlshamn.

Svängsta has a local football club Svängsta IF in a minor division of Swedish football.
