= Mieån =

Coordinates: 56°10′N 14°52′E

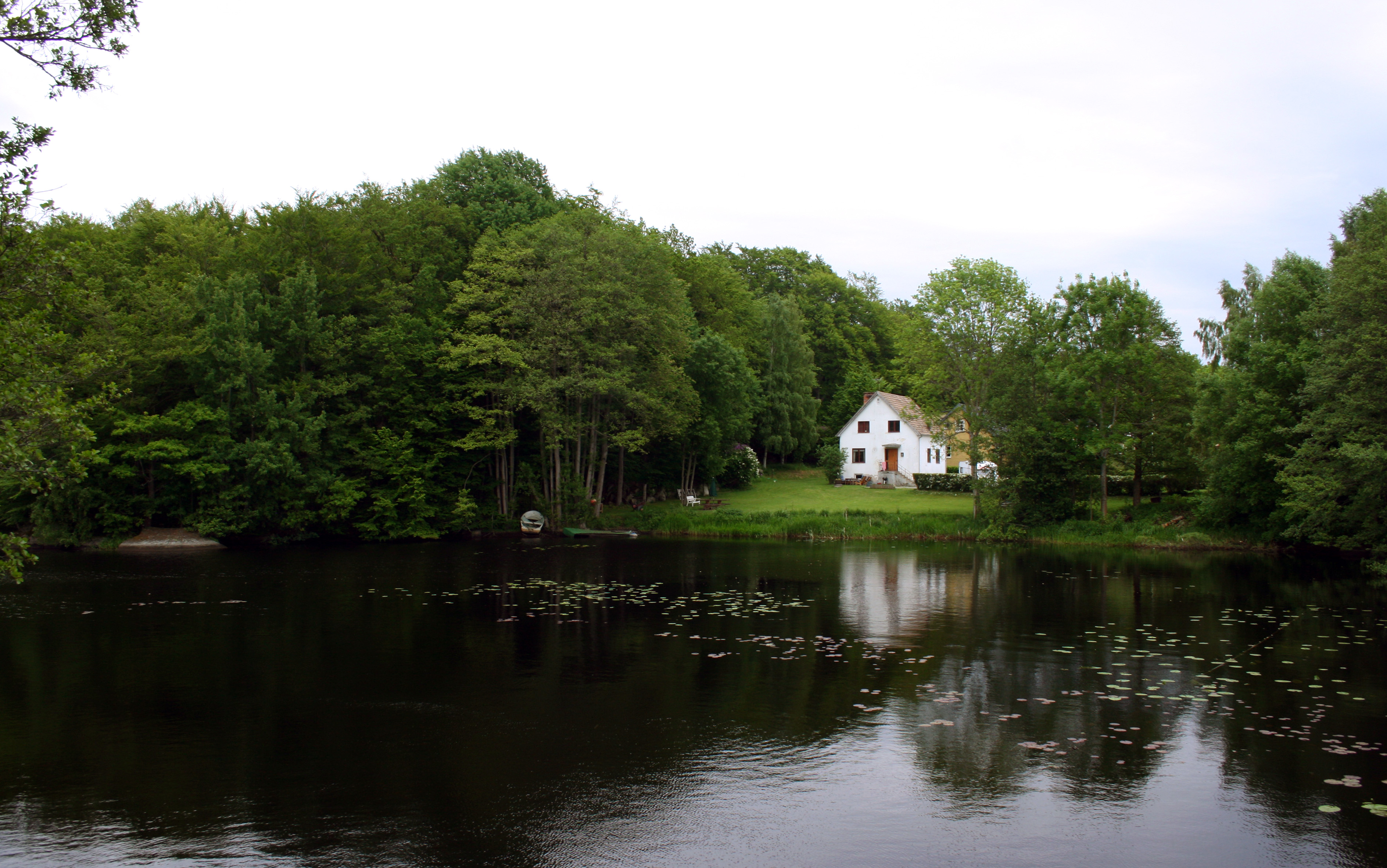

Location
- Country: Sweden

Physical characteristics
- Length: 47.6 km (29.6 mi)
- Basin size: 284.3 km^{2} (109.8 sq mi)

Mieån is a river in Blekinge County and Kronoberg County, Sweden, which it flows south, into the Baltic Sea in the city of Karlshamn.
