= Local federation =

Form of local government

Municipalities and county councils in Sweden may form local federations (Swedish: kommunalförbund) and transfer to such federations the management of local government concerns. When a local federation attends to a matter for which provisions exist in a special enactment, the provisions of that enactment concerning municipalities or county councils shall apply to the local federation.

A local federation shall have as a decision-making body a federation assembly or a federation directorate. Members and alternates of the decision-making assembly are elected, as indicated in the federation statutes, by the assemblies of the federation members.

== See also ==
- County councils of Sweden
- Municipalities of Sweden
- Mancomunidad, a similar construction in Spain
- Joint powers authority, a similar construction in the United States, especially California
