= Bräkne-Hoby =

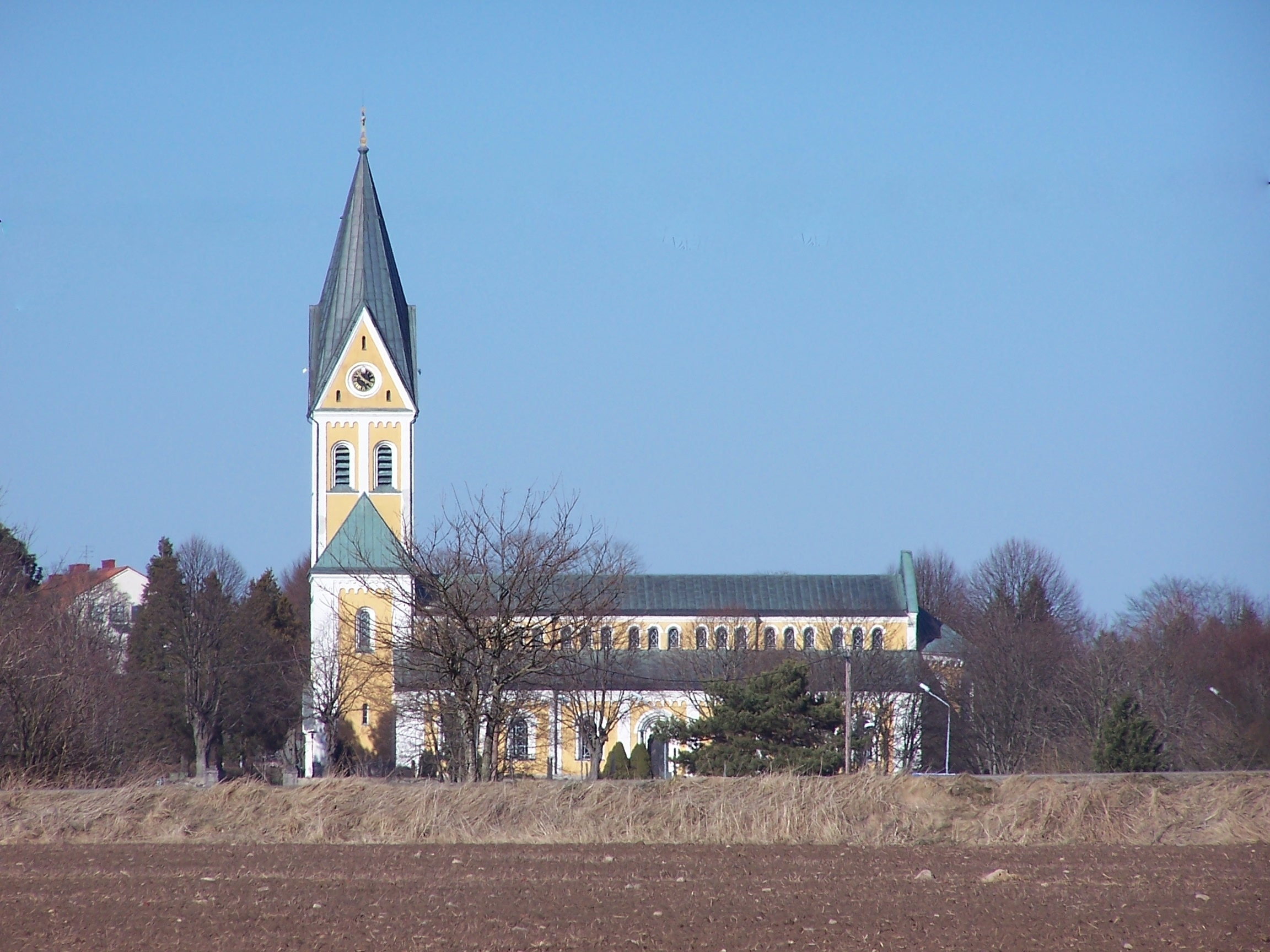
- Bräkne-Hoby church

- Location within Blekinge Location within Sweden
- Coordinates: 56°13′51″N 15°07′15″E
- Country: Sweden
- Province: Blekinge
- County: Blekinge County
- Municipality: Ronneby Municipality

Area
  - Total: 2.07 km^{2} (0.80 sq mi)

Population (31 December 2010)
  - Total: 1,689
  - Density: 815/km^{2} (2,110/sq mi)
- Time zone: UTC+1 (CET)
  - Summer (DST): UTC+2 (CEST)

Bräkne-Hoby is a locality situated in Ronneby Municipality, Blekinge County, Sweden with 1,689 inhabitants in 2010.

It has a middle school and used to have a högstadie (junior-high school). Bräkne-Hoby Parish is a parish in the Church of Sweden. Historically the inhabitants of the parish belonged to Bräkne Hundred in Blekinge. Later a civil parish responsible for municipal tasks, became the separate entity Bräkne-Hoby.
