= Åryd, Karlshamn Municipality =

Åryd
- Location within Blekinge Location within Sweden
- Coordinates: 56°12′30″N 15°01′00″E
- Country: Sweden
- Province: Blekinge
- County: Blekinge County
- Municipality: Karlshamn Municipality

Area
  - Total: 0.67 km^{2} (0.26 sq mi)

Population (31 December 2010)
  - Total: 336
  - Density: 500/km^{2} (1,300/sq mi)
- Time zone: UTC+1 (CET)
  - Summer (DST): UTC+2 (CEST)

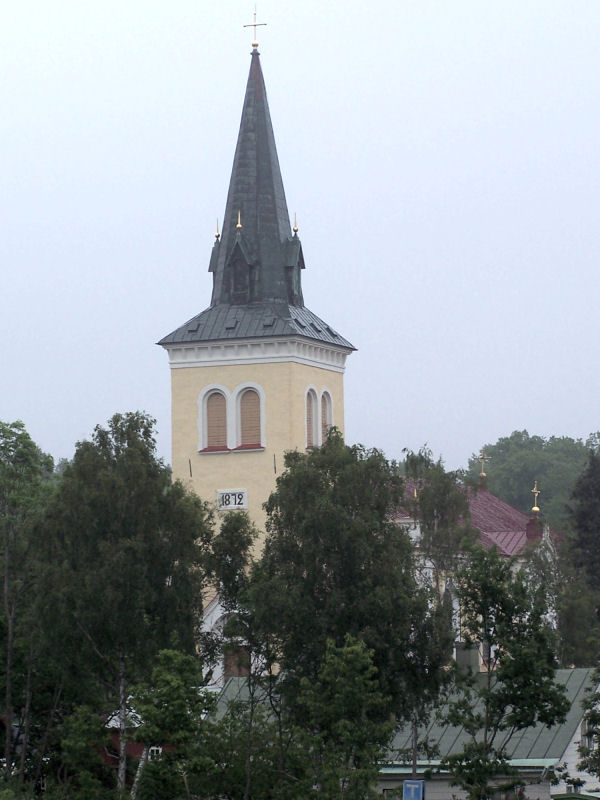
Åryd church

Åryd is a locality situated in Karlshamn Municipality, Blekinge County, Sweden with 336 inhabitants in 2010.
