= Tärnö =

Island in the Blekinge archipelago, Sweden

Coordinates: 56°7′0.49″N 14°58′19.68″E

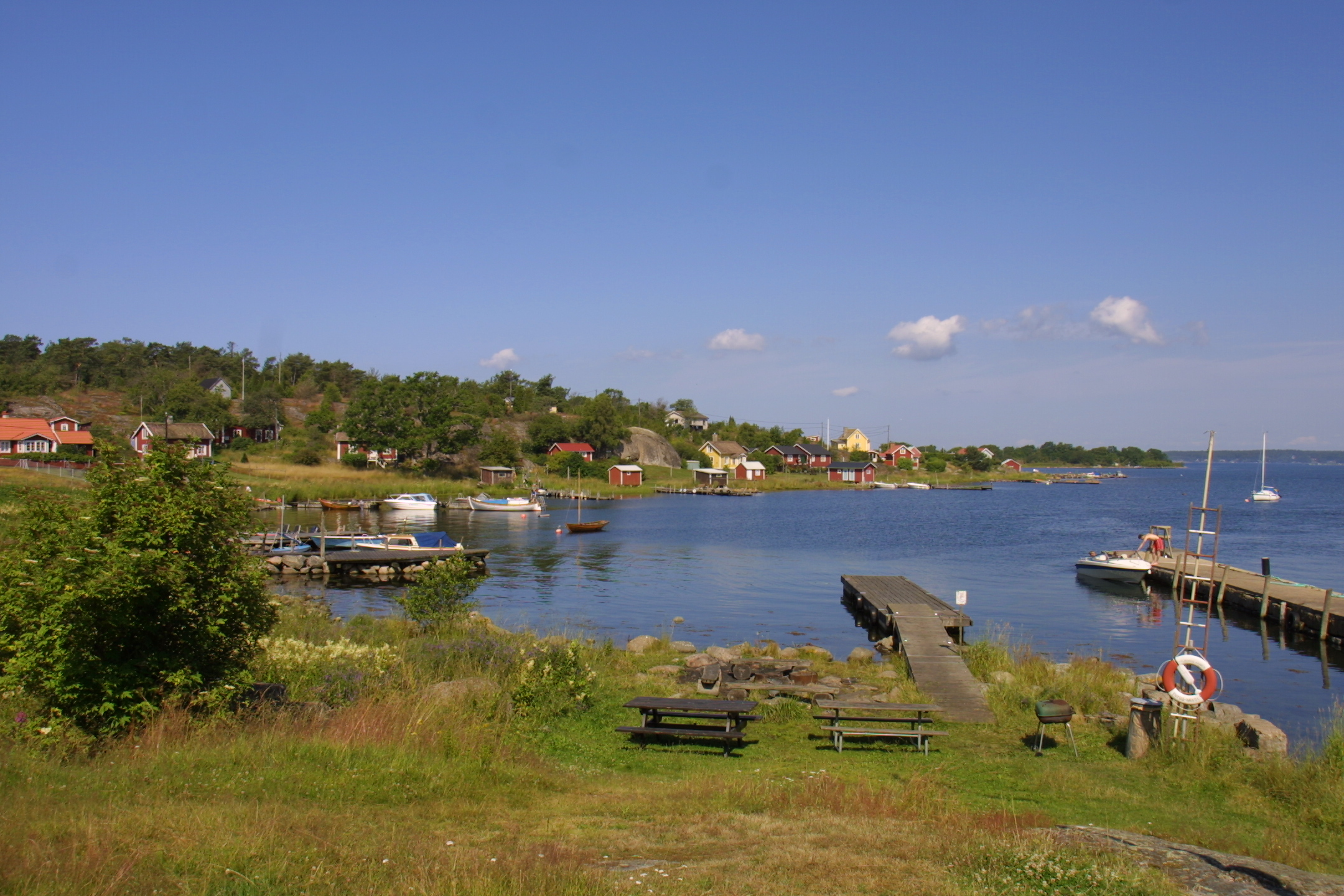
View of Tarno Island

Tärnö is an island in the Blekinge archipelago, the largest and southernmost island in Hällaryd archipelago, in Karlshamn municipality, Blekinge County.

== Geography ==
The island measures 115.7 ha (285.9 acres) in surface. The island has around forty homesteads, now nearly all in use as summer residences.

== History ==
The island's population was once a farming and fishing community, to which many traces bear witness to this day. Tärnö was an important piloting centre during the first half of the 20th century. During that same period, cobblestones were hewn on the island for shipping to Germany and other countries. The island featured in a number of Per Gunnar Evander's novels.

== Communications and services ==
Ferry services to Tärnö are maintained from Karlshamn and from Matvik. Additionally, taxi boats frequent the island. A kiosk is found on the island serving simple food items and other necessities as well as a community centre which is rented out for summer camps and the like. The island's old teacher's residence is also rented out during summer, as are many smaller cottages, both municipally and privately owned.

== Sights ==
Tärnö has two lighthouses. A large wooden one featuring a drum lens at the island's highest point was built in 1910 to replace a predecessor. The other one is a simple structure for guiding coastal fishery which only has a 40 Watt bulb. A known sight apart from the picturesque cottages and the unique natural surroundings is the fiskgökaeken (a hollow centuries-old oak tree), a few Iron Age graves as well as a large naturally formed stone terrace. A number of military installations is still found on the island as a remnant of the time it formed part of the Swedish Navy's shooting range which made the island off-limits to all non-Swedes.
