= Joint powers authority =

Type of government entity in some US states

A joint powers authority (JPA) is an entity permitted under the laws of some U.S. states, whereby two or more public authorities (e.g. local governments, or utility or transport districts) may jointly exercise any power common to all of them. Joint powers authorities may be used where:

- an activity naturally transcends the boundaries of existing public authorities. An example is the Transbay Joint Powers Authority, set up to promote the construction of a new transit center in San Francisco, with several transportation boards and counties around the San Francisco Bay Area as members.
- by combining their commercial efforts, public authorities can achieve economies of scale or market power. An example is National IPA, a purchasing consortium of local government and education agencies, also known as cooperative purchasing.

Joint powers authorities are particularly widely used in California (where they are permitted under Section 6502 of the Government Code), but they are also found in other states.

A joint powers authority is distinct from the member authorities; they have separate operating boards of directors. These boards can be given any of the powers inherent in all of the participating agencies. The authorizing agreement states the powers the new authority will be allowed to exercise. The term, membership, and standing orders of the board of the authority must also be specified. The joint authority may employ staff and establish policies independently of the constituent authorities.

Joint powers authorities receive existing powers from the creating entities; thus, they are distinct from special districts, which receive new delegations of sovereign power from the state.

== See also ==
- Local federation, a similar entity in Sweden
- Mancomunidad, a similar entity in Spain
