= Hällaryd =

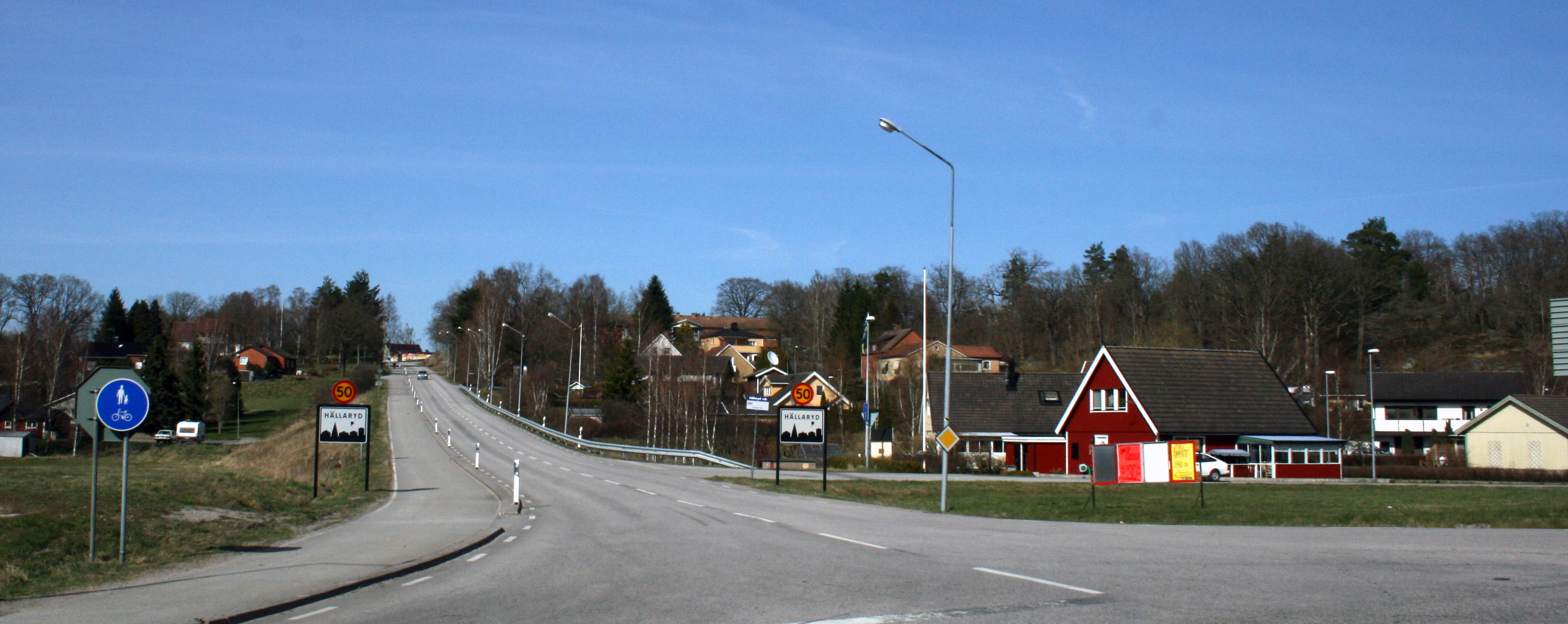

- Location within Blekinge Location within Sweden
- Coordinates: 56°12′10″N 14°56′50″E
- Country: Sweden
- Province: Blekinge
- County: Blekinge County
- Municipality: Karlshamn Municipality

Area
  - Total: 0.70 km^{2} (0.27 sq mi)

Population (31 December 2010)
  - Total: 546
  - Density: 778/km^{2} (2,020/sq mi)
- Time zone: UTC+1 (CET)
  - Summer (DST): UTC+2 (CEST)

Hällaryd is a locality in Karlshamn Municipality, Blekinge County, Sweden with 546 inhabitants in 2010. It is between Karlshamn and Ronneby, featuring the archipelago south of Matvik with Tärnö as its far out landmark.

Historical population
Year	1960	1970	1980	1990	2000	2010
Pop.	350	592	605	595	578	546
±%	—	+69.1%	+2.2%	−1.7%	−2.9%	−5.5%
