= Listerby =

- Location within Blekinge Location within Sweden
- Coordinates: 56°12′N 15°24′E
- Country: Sweden
- Province: Blekinge
- County: Blekinge County
- Municipality: Ronneby Municipality

Area
  - Total: 1.32 km^{2} (0.51 sq mi)

Population (31 December 2010)
  - Total: 883
  - Density: 671/km^{2} (1,740/sq mi)
- Time zone: UTC+1 (CET)
  - Summer (DST): UTC+2 (CEST)

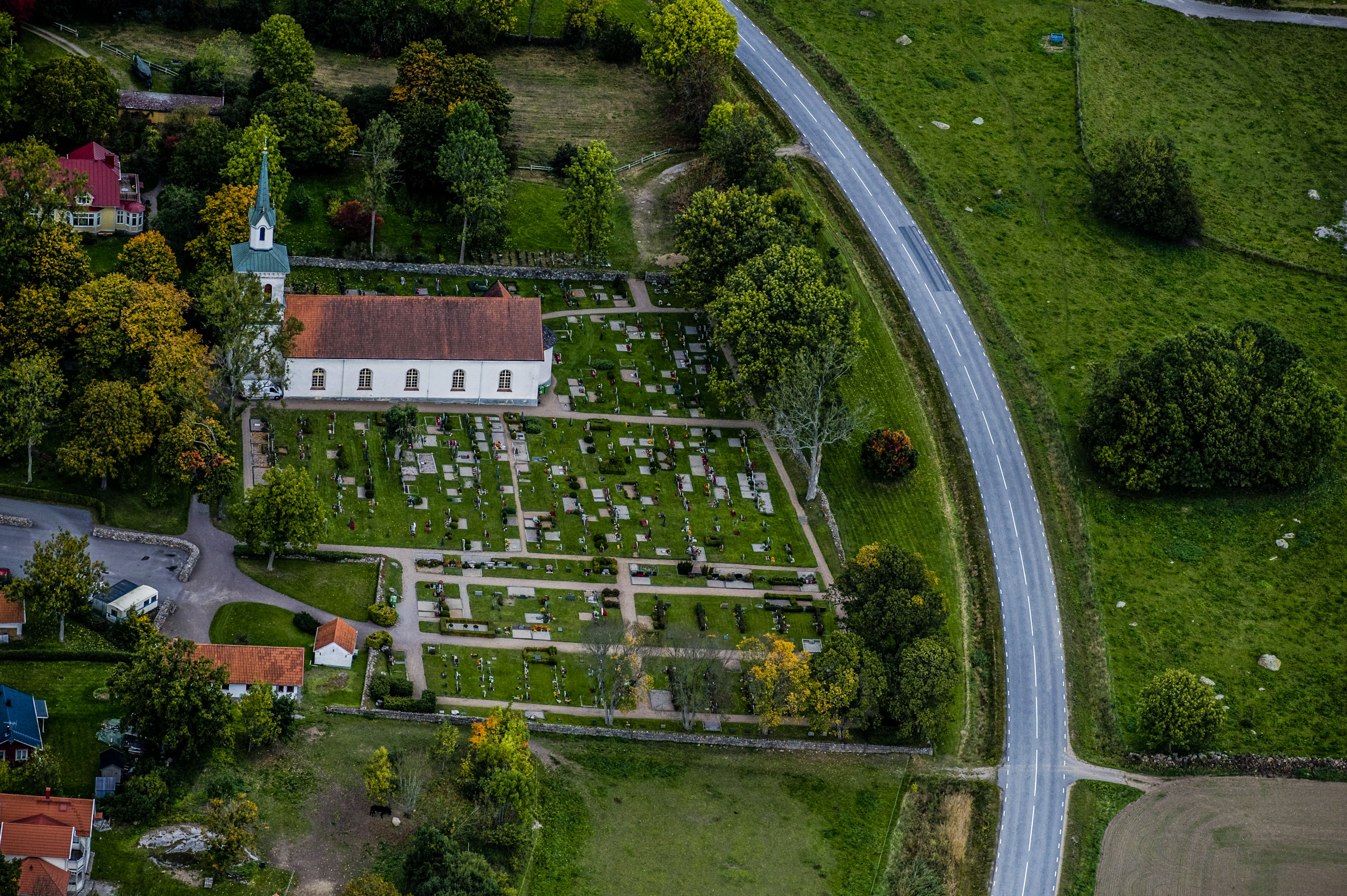
Listerby church

Listerby is a locality situated in Ronneby Municipality, Blekinge County, Sweden with 883 inhabitants in 2010.
