= Mörrum =

- Location within Blekinge Location within Sweden
- Coordinates: 56°11′N 14°44′E
- Country: Sweden
- Province: Blekinge
- County: Blekinge County
- Municipality: Karlshamn Municipality

Area
  - Total: 3.44 km^{2} (1.33 sq mi)

Population (31 December 2010)
  - Total: 3,695
  - Density: 1,074/km^{2} (2,780/sq mi)
- Time zone: UTC+1 (CET)
  - Summer (DST): UTC+2 (CEST)

Mörrum is the second largest locality situated in Karlshamn Municipality, Blekinge County, Sweden with 3,695 inhabitants in 2010.
