= Ronneby Municipality =

Ronneby Municipality Ronneby kommun
- Municipality
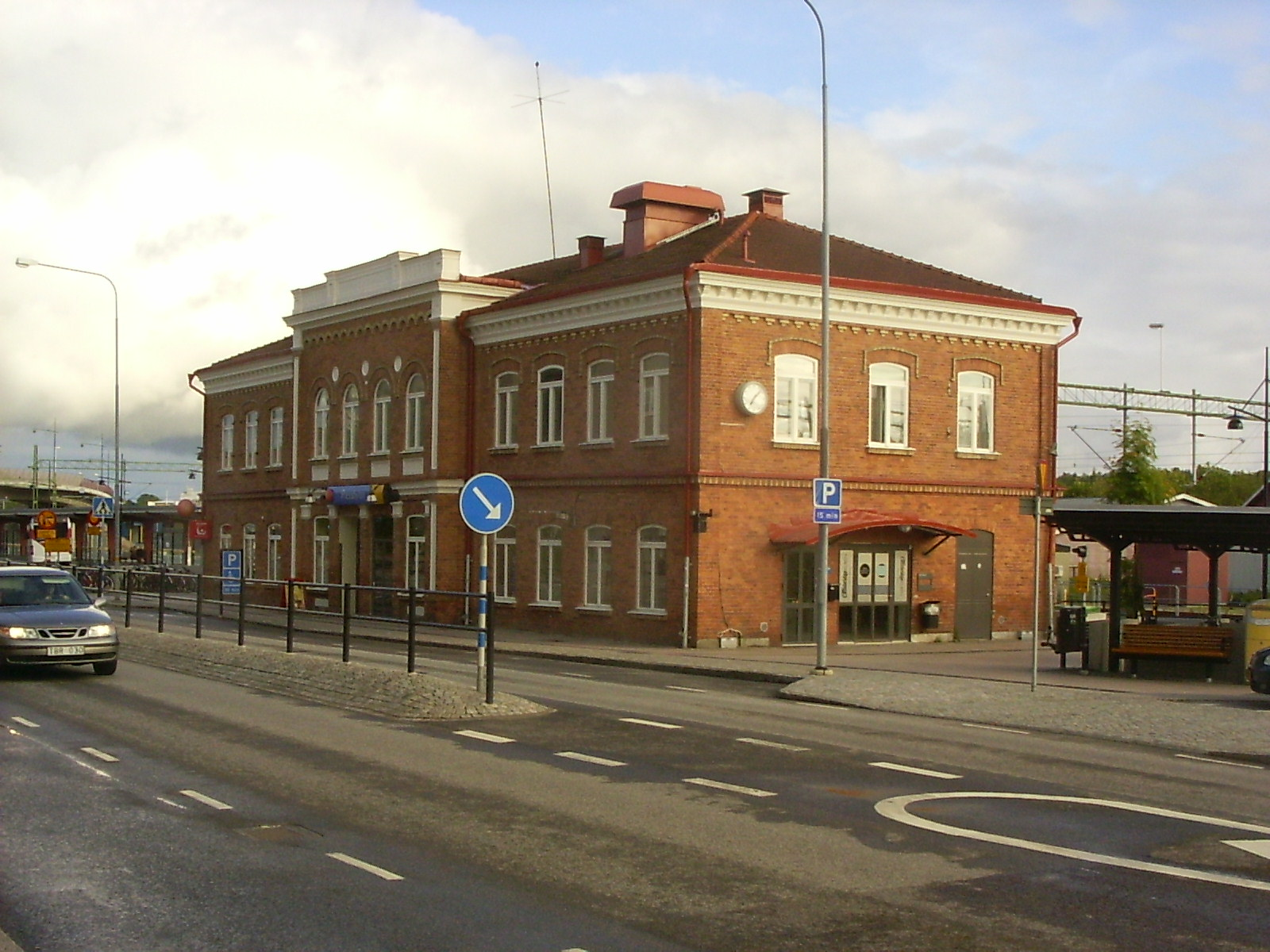
- Ronneby Train Station

- Flag Coat of arms

- Coordinates: 56°12′N 15°17′E
- Country: Sweden
- County: Blekinge County
- Seat: Ronneby

Area
  - Total: 1,241.85 km^{2} (479.48 sq mi)
  - Land: 825.34 km^{2} (318.67 sq mi)
  - Water: 416.51 km^{2} (160.82 sq mi)
- Area as of 1 January 2014.

Population (30 June 2025)
  - Total: 28,744
  - Density: 34.827/km^{2} (90.201/sq mi)
- Time zone: UTC+1 (CET)
  - Summer (DST): UTC+2 (CEST)
- ISO 3166 code: SE
- Province: Blekinge
- Municipal code: 1081
- Website: www.ronneby.se

Ronneby Municipality (Swedish: Ronneby kommun) is a municipality in Blekinge County in South Sweden in southern Sweden. It borders to Tingsryd Municipality, Emmaboda Municipality, Karlskrona Municipality and Karlshamn Municipality. The town of Ronneby is the seat of the municipality.

The present municipality was created in 1967 through the amalgamation of the City of Ronneby with three surrounding units.

== Localities ==
There are 8 urban areas (also called a Tätort or locality) in Ronneby Municipality.

In the table the localities are listed according to the size of the population as of December 31, 2010. The municipal seat is in bold characters.

#	Locality	Population
1	**Ronneby**	12,029
2	Kallinge	4,561
3	Bräkne-Hoby	1,689
4	Johannishus	748
5	Listerby	883
6	Backaryd	365
7	Eringsboda	299
8	Hallabro	254

== Demographics ==
This is a demographic table based on Ronneby Municipality's electoral districts in the 2022 Swedish general election sourced from SVT's election platform, in turn taken from SCB official statistics.

In total there were 29,148 residents, including 21,933 Swedish citizens of voting age. 42.4 % voted for the left coalition and 56.0 % for the right coalition. Indicators are in percentage points except population totals and income.

Location	Residents	Citizen adults	Left vote	Right vote	Employed	Swedish parents	Foreign heritage	Income SEK	Degree
Location			%	%					
Backaryd-Öljehult	1,523	1,167	35.8	62.9	75	87	13	20,790	28
Blekan	1,584	1,233	44.0	54.8	69	73	27	20,377	36
Bräkne-Hoby	1,438	1,140	39.4	59.7	84	94	6	27,397	38
Bräkne-Hoby C	1,719	1,336	47.9	50.6	78	89	11	21,139	28
Centrum	1,715	1,321	45.8	52.6	71	70	30	20,680	34
Espedalen	1,871	1,128	60.6	36.1	55	39	61	16,142	30
Fredriksberg	1,636	1,200	42.1	56.8	76	83	17	25,503	52
Förkärla-Listerby N	1,437	1,138	39.4	60.1	87	94	6	28,624	46
Hasselstad-Eringsboda	1,349	1,072	30.9	68.3	79	91	9	22,070	28
Hjortsberga-Edestad	1,623	1,284	37.4	61.8	87	95	5	25,967	34
Hulta	1,593	1,211	44.1	54.6	89	90	10	28,619	48
Häggatorp	1,576	1,151	38.8	60.0	73	78	22	21,603	22
Kalleberga	1,623	1,219	39.4	58.9	83	80	20	23,580	24
Kallinge	1,753	1,250	43.5	52.9	67	70	30	19,995	24
Listerby S	922	773	34.9	63.9	82	93	7	27,640	46
Lugnet	1,707	1,325	41.5	57.4	80	80	20	25,192	38
Persborg	1,407	1,248	39.7	59.2	82	86	14	26,801	43
Varan	1,003	810	43.2	55.9	86	94	6	28,165	53
Älgbacken	1,669	927	59.1	35.1	56	37	63	15,655	26
Source: SVT

== Parishes ==
Parishes ordered by hundreds:

1. Bräkne Hundred
  - Bräkne-Hoby Parish
  - Öljehult Parish
2. Medelstad Hundred
  - Backaryd Parish
  - Edestad Parish
  - Eringsboda Parish
  - Förkärla Parish
  - Hjortsberga Parish
  - Listerby Parish
  - Ronneby Parish

== International relations ==
- Bornholm, Denmark
- Mänttä, Finland
- Steglitz-Zehlendorf, Germany
- Schopfheim, Germany
- Høyanger, Norway
- Elbląg, Poland
- Slavsk, Russia
- Enfield, Connecticut, United States
- Johnson City, Tennessee, United States

== See also ==
- Trolleboda, a village located here
