= Karlshamn Municipality =

Karlshamn Municipality Karlshamns kommun
- Municipality
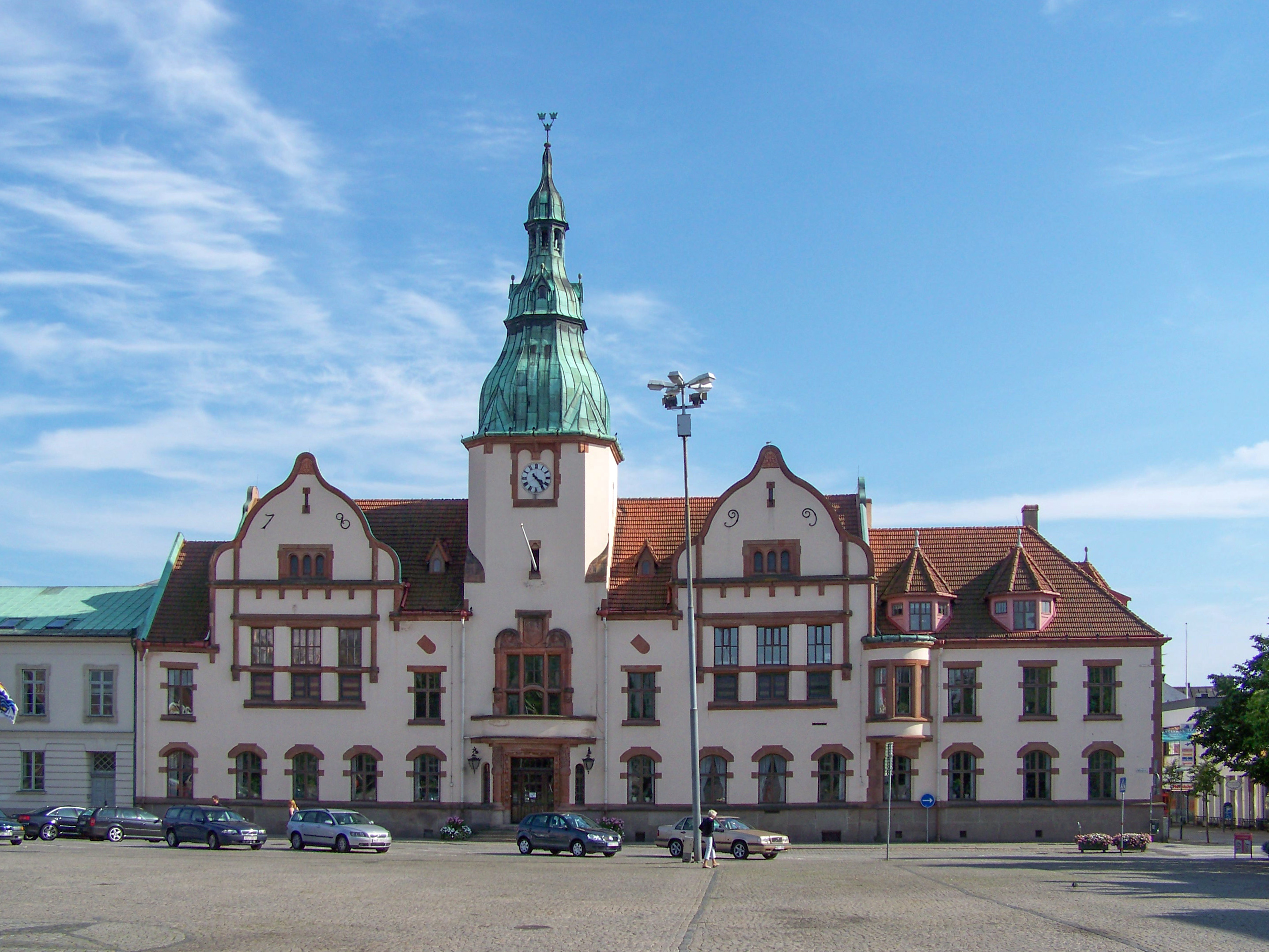
- Karlshamn Town Hall

- Coat of arms

- Coordinates: 56°10′N 14°51′E
- Country: Sweden
- County: Blekinge County
- Seat: Karlshamn

Area
  - Total: 832.42 km^{2} (321.40 sq mi)
  - Land: 488.68 km^{2} (188.68 sq mi)
  - Water: 343.74 km^{2} (132.72 sq mi)
- Area as of 1 January 2014.

Population (30 June 2025)
  - Total: 31,742
  - Density: 64.955/km^{2} (168.23/sq mi)
- Time zone: UTC+1 (CET)
  - Summer (DST): UTC+2 (CEST)
- ISO 3166 code: SE
- Province: Blekinge
- Municipal code: 1082
- Website: www.karlshamn.se

Karlshamn Municipality (Swedish: Karlshamns kommun) is a municipality in Blekinge County in South Sweden in southern Sweden. It borders to Olofström Municipality, Sölvesborg Municipality, Ronneby Municipality and Tingsryd Municipality. The city of Karlshamn is the seat of the municipality.

== Administrative territory ==
In 1863, at the time of first municipal legislation in Sweden, the area was divided into the City of Karlshamn and five rural municipalities. In 1881 a further subdivision was made by Asarum into Ringamåla. The administrative reform in 1952 reduced the number of municipalities surrounding the town to Hällaryd (Hällaryds plus Åryds municipalities), Asarum (reunition of Asarum and Ringamåla), Mörrum (municipalities Elleholm plus Mörrum). In 1/1 1967 the town of Karlshamn was united with Asarum, Hällaryd och Mörrum to form the present municipality when all local government units in Sweden became municipalities of unitary type.

== Localities ==
There are 6 urban areas (also called a Tätort or locality) in Karlshamn Municipality.

In the table the localities are listed according to the size of the population as of December 31, 2010. The municipal seat is in bold characters.

#	Locality	Population
1	**Karlshamn**	19,075
2	Mörrum	3,695
3	Svängsta	1,682
4	Hällaryd	546
5	Åryd	336
6	Torarp	263

In total, just above 32,000 people live in Karlshamn, which makes it the second largest municipality in Blekinge County.

== Demographics ==
This is a demographic table based on Karlshamn Municipality's electoral districts in the 2022 Swedish general election sourced from SVT's election platform, in turn taken from SCB official statistics.

In total there were 32,182 residents, including 24,986 Swedish citizens of voting age. 44.4 % voted for the left coalition and 54.5 % for the right coalition. Indicators are in percentage points except population totals and income.

Location	Residents	Citizen adults	Left vote	Right vote	Employed	Swedish parents	Foreign heritage	Income SEK	Degree
Location			%	%					
Centrala Asarum	2,186	1,660	49.6	49.8	72	75	25	20,679	34
Froarp	2,244	1,690	42.1	57.6	86	92	8	27,708	38
Gustavstorp	1,432	1,175	39.8	59.1	83	89	11	24,338	30
Horsaryd	2,315	1,763	41.9	57.3	83	86	14	26,718	31
Hällaryd	2,123	1,689	40.7	58.2	83	90	10	24,160	36
Högadal	1,997	1,408	48.8	50.0	67	67	33	20,769	41
Korpadalen	1,754	1,339	42.5	56.4	87	87	13	29,583	51
Mörrum V	1,750	1,242	41.0	57.6	75	76	24	21,805	27
Mörrum Ö	1,716	1,304	45.2	54.5	85	88	12	25,385	39
Prästslätten	1,684	1,378	47.9	50.2	80	81	19	25,255	46
Skogsborg	1,405	1,156	46.8	52.1	85	92	8	28,784	56
Stadsporten	1,655	1,363	45.2	53.3	74	78	22	21,896	36
Svängsta NO	2,083	1,455	46.3	52.7	70	73	27	20,680	28
Svängsta SV	1,339	1,000	33.9	64.6	79	87	13	23,396	28
Torget	1,597	1,392	42.7	55.8	70	80	20	22,188	36
Tubbaryd	1,520	1,166	48.0	50.6	74	69	31	23,700	41
Vägga	1,819	1,527	45.7	53.8	84	92	8	28,624	53
Österslätt	1,563	1,279	47.9	50.8	73	69	31	22,423	41
Source: SVT

== Economy ==
The municipal tax is deducted as a percentage of individual citizens income. It is 21.89% 2009. The average personal income in the municipality was 158594 SEK year 2009. This is 96% of the national average (SCB). The council also derives income from the municipal harbour, the energy services etc.

== Parishes ==
Parishes ordered by city and hundreds:

1. Karlshamn
  - Karlshamn Parish
2. Bräkne Hundred
  - Asarum Parish
  - Hällaryd Parish
  - Mörrum Parish
  - Ringamåla Parish
  - Åryd Parish
3. Lister Hundred
  - Elleholm Parish
  - Mörrum Parish
