= Municipalities of Sweden =

Local administrative subdivisions of Sweden

Municipalities of Sweden Sveriges kommuner (Swedish)
- Sweden's municipal borders
- Category: Municipality
- Location: Sweden
- Found in: Counties
- Number: 290 (list)
- Possible types: Municipality
- Government: municipal assembly

The municipalities of Sweden (Swedish: Sveriges kommuner) are its generally smaller but co-equal local government entities. There are 290 municipalities which are responsible for a large proportion of local services, including schools, emergency services and physical planning.

== Foundation ==
The Local Government Act of 1991 specifies several responsibilities for the municipalities, and provides outlines for local government, such as the process for electing the municipal assembly. It also regulates a process (laglighetsprövning, "legality trial") through which any citizen can appeal the decisions of a local government to a county court.

Municipal government in Sweden is similar to city commission government and cabinet-style council government. A legislative municipal assembly (kommunfullmäktige) of between 31 and 101 members (always an odd number) is elected from party-list proportional representation at municipal elections, held every four years in conjunction with the national general elections. The assembly in turn appoints a municipal executive committee (kommunstyrelse) from its members. The executive committee is headed by its chairman, (Swedish: kommunstyrelsens ordförande). Swedish municipalities generally employ one or more politicians as Municipal Commissioners, (Swedish: kommunalråd) one of which is usually the chairman of the executive committee.

The government of the Stockholm municipality is partially based on its own, separate municipal government law.

== History ==
The first local government acts were implemented on 1 January 1863. There were two acts, one for the cities and one for the countryside. The total number of municipalities was about 2,500.

The rural municipalities were based on the country-side civil parishes or administrative parishes (socknar), often formed in the Middle Ages around a church. The municipality acts of 1862 formally separated the civil municipalities from the parishes, establishing the municipality assembly as the decision-making body of rural municipalities and the church assembly as the decision-making body of parishes.

The then 89 cities/towns (städer) (the same word is used for both city and town in Swedish) were based on the old chartered cities. There was also a third type, köping or market town. The status of these was somewhere between the rural municipalities and the cities. There were only eight of them in 1863, rising to a peak of 96 in 1959.

Up until 1930, when the total number of municipalities reached its peak (2,532 entities), there were more partitions than amalgamations.

In 1943 more than 500 of Sweden's municipalities had fewer than 500 inhabitants, and the 1943 års kommunindelningskommitté ("Municipal subdivision commission of 1943") proposed that the number of rural municipalities should be drastically reduced.

After years of preparations the first of the two nationwide municipal reforms of the 20th century was implemented in 1952. The number of rural municipalities was reduced from 2,281 to 816. The cities (by then 133) were not affected.

Rather soon it was established that the reform of 1952 was not radical enough. A new commission, 1959 års indelningssakkunniga ("Subdivision experts of 1959") concluded that the next municipal reform should create new larger mixed rural/urban municipalities.

The Riksdag decided in 1962 that the new reform should be implemented on a voluntary basis. The process started in January 1964, when all municipalities were grouped in 282 kommunblock ("municipal blocks"). The co-operation within the blocks should ultimately lead to amalgamations. The target year was 1971, when all municipalities should be of uniform type and all the remaining formal differences in government and privileges between cities and rural municipalities should be abolished.

The amalgamations within the "blocks" started in 1965 and more were accomplished in 1967 and 1969, when the number of municipalities dropped from 1006 to 848. The Riksdag, however, found the amalgamation process too slow, and decided to speed it up by ending the voluntary aspect. In 1971 the unitary municipality (kommun) was introduced and the number of entities went down to 464; three years later it was 278. In one case (Svedala Municipality) the process was not accomplished until 1977.

Most of the municipalities were soon consolidated, but in some cases the antagonism within the new unities was so strong that it led to "divorces". The total number of municipalities has today risen to 290.

The question of whether a new municipality will be created is at the discretion of the central Swedish government. It is recommended that the lower limit of a new municipality shall be 5,000 inhabitants.

Some municipalities still use the term "City" (Swedish: stad) when referring to themselves, a practice adopted by the largest and most urban municipalities Stockholm, Gothenburg and Malmö. Thirteen municipalities altogether, some of them including considerable rural areas, have made this choice, which is unofficial and has no effect on the administrative status of the municipality. The practice can, however, create some confusion as the term stad nowadays normally refers to a larger built-up area and not to an administrative entity.

== Geographical boundaries ==
The municipalities in Sweden cover the entire territory of the nation. Unlike the United States or Canada, there are no unincorporated areas. The municipalities in the north cover large areas of sparsely populated land. Kiruna, at 19,446 km^{2}, is sometimes held to be the world's largest "city" by area, although places like La Tuque, Quebec (28,421 km^{2}, official style Ville), the City of Kalgoorlie-Boulder in Western Australia (95,575.1 km^{2} and the Altamira in Northern Brazil (159,533 km^{2}) are larger. (By comparison, the total area of the state of Lebanon is 10,452 km^{2}.) At any rate, several northern municipalities are larger than many counties in the more densely populated southern part of the country.

=== Sub-division ===
The municipalities were earlier also divided into parishes, or församlingar. As these were subdivisions of the Church of Sweden, the separation of church and state along with a shift in responsibility for the population registration in Sweden transferring to the Swedish Tax Agency led to a new formal subdivision called districts, which have been in force since 2016. These districts correspond by and large to the previous parishes as they existed on 31 December 1999, without later amalgamations. Many of the districts still correspond to the earlier 17th century division socknar, though the Swedish municipality reforms of 1862–63, 1952 and to some extent 1971, did perform some amalgamations and transferrals of land (including populations) between municipalities.

== Duties ==
According to law, the municipalities are responsible for:

- Childcare and pre-school
- Primary and secondary schools
- Social service
- Elderly care
- Support to people with disabilities
- Health and environmental issues
- Emergency services (not policing, which is the responsibility of the central government)
- Urban planning
- Sanitation (waste, sewage)

Many municipalities in addition have services like leisure activities for youths and housing services to make them attractive in getting residents.

== See also ==
- List of municipalities of Sweden
- List of former municipalities of Sweden
- List of Swedish municipalities by wealth
- Local federation, when two or more municipalities form a joint organ to which they transfer some of their responsibilities, like a joint powers authority.
