= Thomas Askebrand =

Swedish football manager

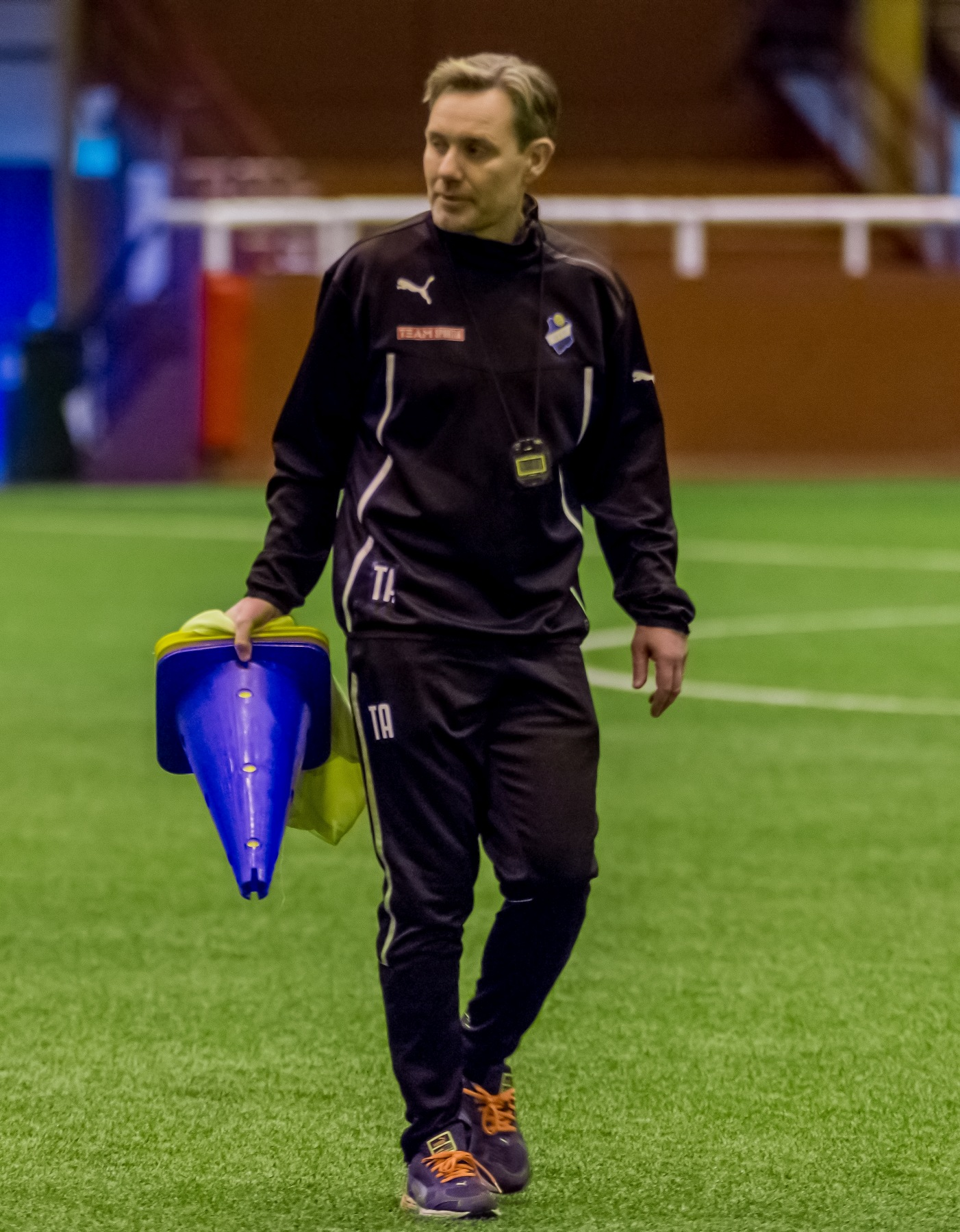

Personal information
- Full name: Thomas Anders Roland Askebrand
- Date of birth: 23 January 1969 (age 57)
- Place of birth: Åsa, Sweden

Team information
- Current team: Varbergs BoIS

Managerial career
- Years: Team
- 1995–1998: Hanhals BK
- 1999–2001: Bua IF
- 2002–2004: Lerkils IF
- 2005: Västra Frölunda (assistant)
- 2006–2008: Lerkils IF
- 2008–2012: Falkenbergs FF
- 2013–2014: GAIS
- 2015–2017: Östers IF
- 2018–2019: Örgryte IS
- 2020–2021: Västerås SK
- 2023–: Varbergs BoIS

Thomas Askebrand, born Johansson 23 January 1969 in Åsa, is a Swedish football manager. He is the sporting director and formally manager of Varbergs BoIS.

== Management career ==
Thomas started out his managing career for small local clubs in Hanhals, Bua and Lerkil. After one year in the Gothenburg club Västra Frölunda, as an assistant coach, he joined Superettan side Falkenberg. After five good seasons, Thomas left for the bigger club GAIS in January 2013.

After a defeat against Östersund at home in the 9th game of the 2014-season, Gais officially sacked Askebrand due to bad results. The supporters and the board didn't think 8 points and a 13th place was good enough.

On 10 December 2014 Östers IF announced Thomas Askebrand as their new head coach for two years. Östers played in Allsvenskan in 2013 but got relegated from both Allsvenskan and later Superettan the following year.

In November 2017, it was confirmed that Askebrand would take charge of Örgryte IS from the 2018 season. He left the club at the end of the 2019 season and was appointed head coach of Västerås SK.
