= Gundal =

Gundal may refer to:

- Gundal och Högås, a locality in Sweden
- Gundal, Ranga Reddy, a village in India
