= Lygnern =

Lake in Sweden

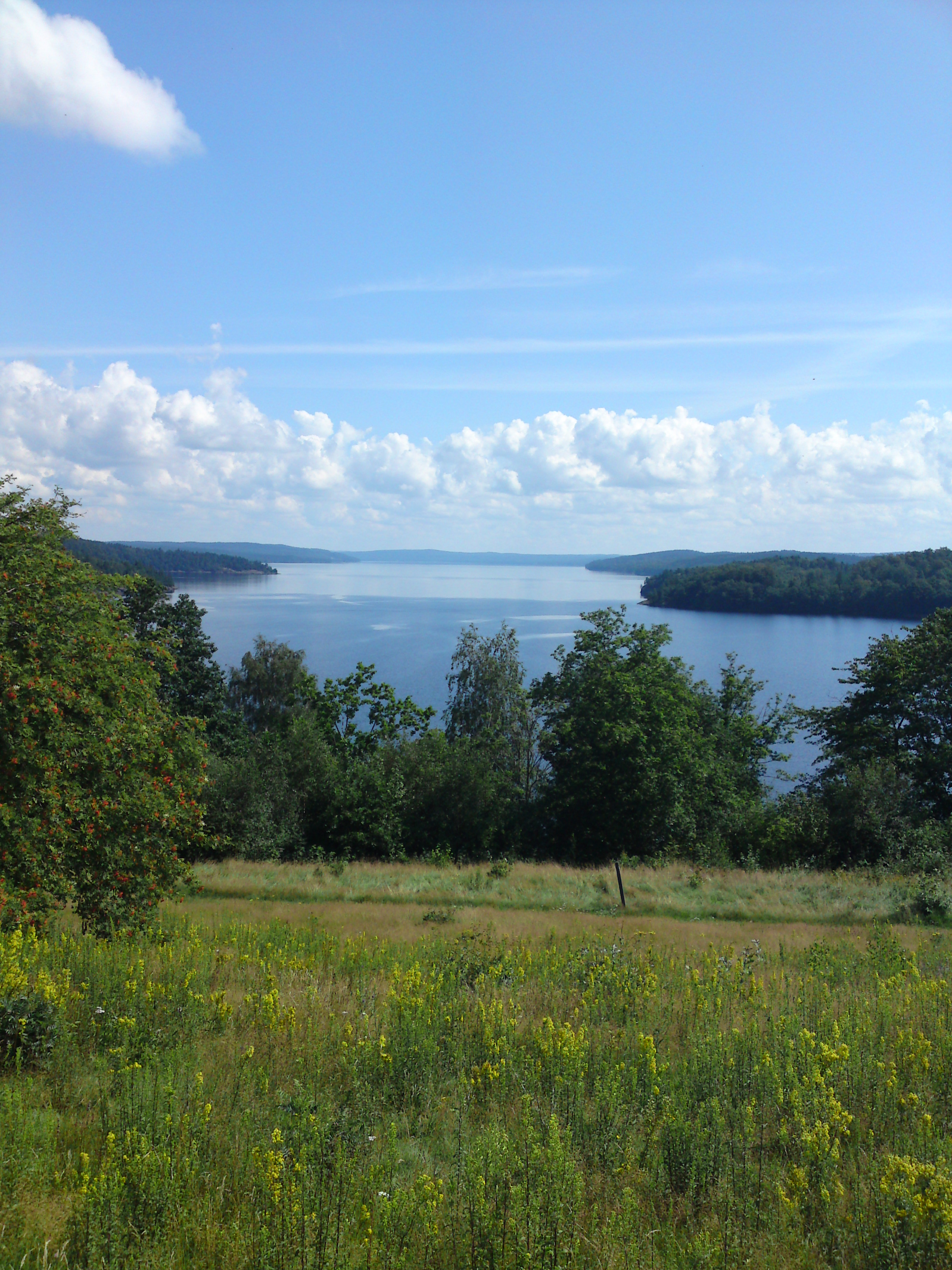

- Location within Västra Götaland Location within Sweden
- Location: Halland County, Västra Götaland County, Sweden
- Coordinates: 57°28′36″N 12°20′22″E
- Primary outflows: Rolfsån
- Basin countries: Sweden
- Max. length: 20 km (12 mi)
- Max. width: 2.5 km (1.6 mi)
- Surface area: 33 km^{2} (13 sq mi)
- Max. depth: 50 m (160 ft)
- Surface elevation: 15 m (49 ft)
- Settlements: Fjärås kyrkby, Sätila

Lygnern (Swedish pronunciation: [ˈlʏ̂ŋːnɛɳ]) is a lake in the municipalities of Kungsbacka and Mark, western Sweden. With an area of 33 km², it is the largest lake in Halland County. Its main outflow is Rolfsån, which in turn empties out into the Kungsbacka Fjord.

The lake serves as a source of drinking water for Kungsbacka. In 2006, it was nominated as the cleanest lake in Sweden, as 98% of the surveyed residents of the municipality were satisfied with the water quality.

== Fishing ==
Ten fish species have been found in the lake, which is particularly rich in pike, trout and European perch.
