= Brataas =

Brataas is a surname. Notable people with the surname include:

- Nancy Brataas (1928–2014), American politician and consultant
- Tone Heimdal Brataas (born 1970), Norwegian politician

== See also ==
- Brattås
