= Vassbäck =

- Location within Halland Location within Sweden
- Coordinates: 57°20′30″N 12°08′30″E
- Country: Sweden
- Province: Halland
- County: Halland County
- Municipality: Kungsbacka Municipality

Area
  - Total: 1.32 km^{2} (0.51 sq mi)

Population (31 December 2010)
  - Total: 617
  - Density: 466/km^{2} (1,210/sq mi)
- Time zone: UTC+1 (CET)
  - Summer (DST): UTC+2 (CEST)

Vassbäck is a locality situated in Kungsbacka Municipality, Halland County, Sweden with 617 inhabitants in 2010.
