= Frillesås =

- Location within Halland Location within Sweden
- Coordinates: 57°19′N 12°10′E
- Country: Sweden
- Province: Halland
- County: Halland County
- Municipality: Kungsbacka Municipality

Area
  - Total: 2.30 km^{2} (0.89 sq mi)

Population (31 December 2010)
  - Total: 2,044
  - Density: 889/km^{2} (2,300/sq mi)
- Time zone: UTC+1 (CET)
  - Summer (DST): UTC+2 (CEST)

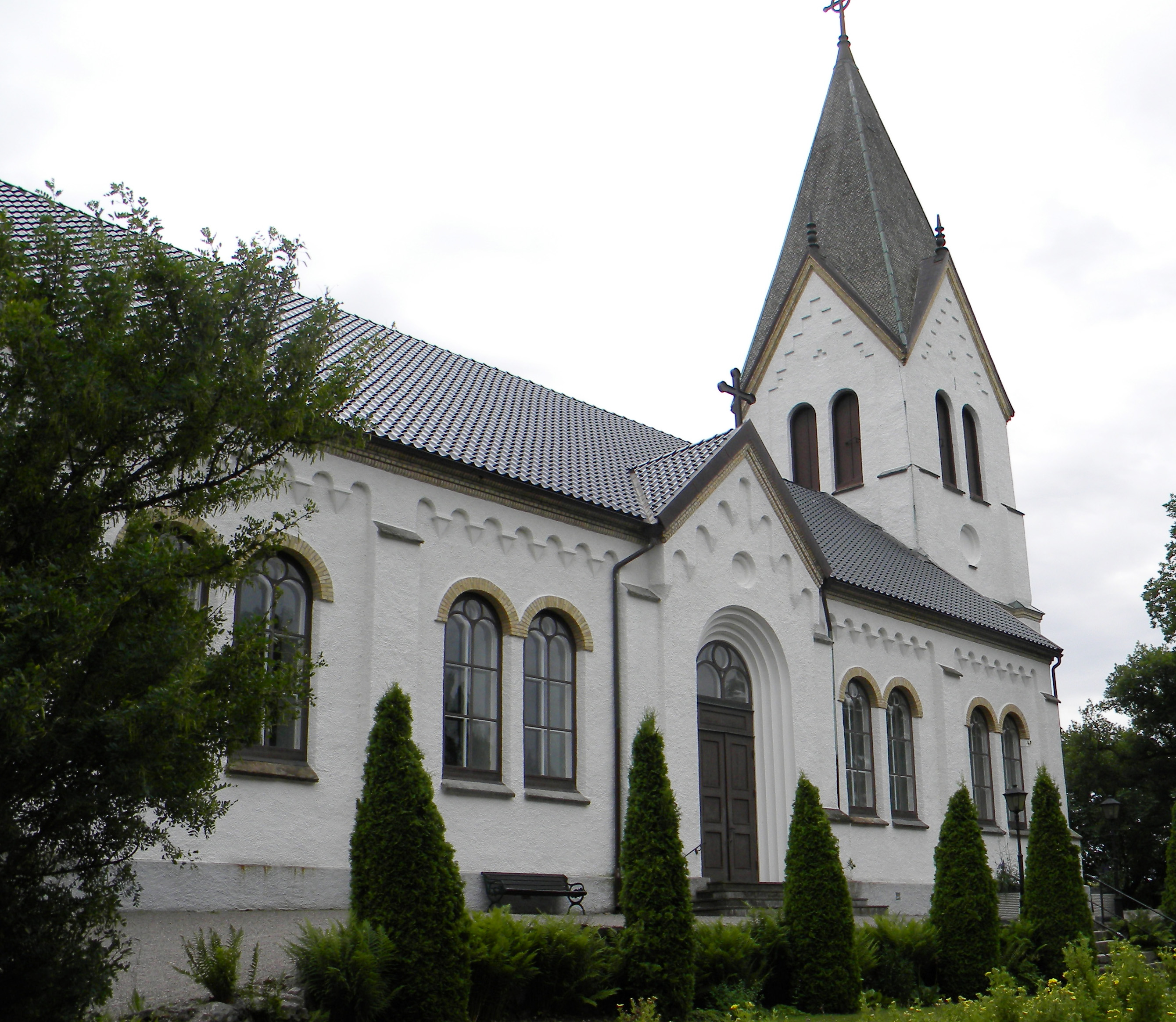
Frillesås Church

Frillesås is a locality situated in Kungsbacka Municipality, Halland County, Sweden, with 2,044 inhabitants in 2010. Frillesås BK is a bandy club.

The locality has a population of approximately 3,000 residents. It is located on the coast facing the Kattegat, where the Löfta River flows into the sea at Frillesås.

Frillesås has been classified as a locality since 1960. In 1990, Statistics Sweden (SCB) designated a small locality with the same name just west of the existing settlement. During the 1995 and 2000 delimitations, both localities existed side by side, but in 2005, the small locality was incorporated into the main settlement.

== Etymology ==
The name Frillesås, recorded as Fridlessos in 1559, is believed to derive from the personal name Frithlef combined with ås, referring to a ridge west of the church.

According to legend and local tradition, the name originates from a king named Fridlef, also known as Frille. His grave is said to be located on a ridge just east of the settlement and is identified as an archaeological site from the Late Iron Age.

Frillesås has long been a popular destination for vacationers, drawn by the sandy bays and rocky shores of Kattegat, particularly in Torstensvik and Vallersvik. Many visitors own summer homes, while others stay at the Vallersvik facility, which includes a campsite, guesthouse, and conference center. This facility was previously owned by the Baptist Union for over a century.

In the past, Frillesås had several guesthouses, and special "bathing trains" operated from Gothenburg to the now-closed Frillesås railway station on the West Coast Line. Although the station is no longer in use, Frillesås has regained partial rail connectivity through feeder buses (line 777) to the nearby Åsa station. The locality also has bus connections to Kungsbacka station (line 732, with transfers to commuter trains toward Gothenburg) and Varberg (line 615).

While the settlement is increasingly adapting to year-round residency, its population continues to rise significantly during the summer months.

Frillesås is home to Rya Church, which belongs to Frillesås Parish within the Church of Sweden. However, the northern part of the locality falls under Landa Parish. Additionally, the Vallersvik Ecumenical Congregation represents the free church tradition in the area.

== Sports ==
Frillesås BK is the local sports club, primarily known for its bandy team. On February 24, 2018, the club secured promotion to the Elitserien for the 2018–2019 season, becoming the first team from Halland to compete in Sweden's top division of men's bandy.

== Notable People from Frillesås ==
- F. O. Nilsson – Founder of Sweden's first Baptist congregation, originally known as Sveriges baptistförsamling.
- Johannes Ericson i Borekulla – Schoolteacher and member of the Swedish Parliament in the 19th century.
- Johannes Antonsson – Centre Party politician, Minister of Municipal Affairs, and Governor.
- Mikael Sandklef – Footballer who played in Allsvenskan for Västra Frölunda, IFK Göteborg, and GAIS.
- Albert Sandklef – Folklore researcher, cultural historian, and director of Varberg Museum.
- Janne Lucas Persson – Musician.
- Rasmus Sjöberg – Motocross rider.
