= Särö Västerskog =

Nature reserve in Kungsbacka, Sweden

Coordinates: 57°30′20″N 11°55′29″E

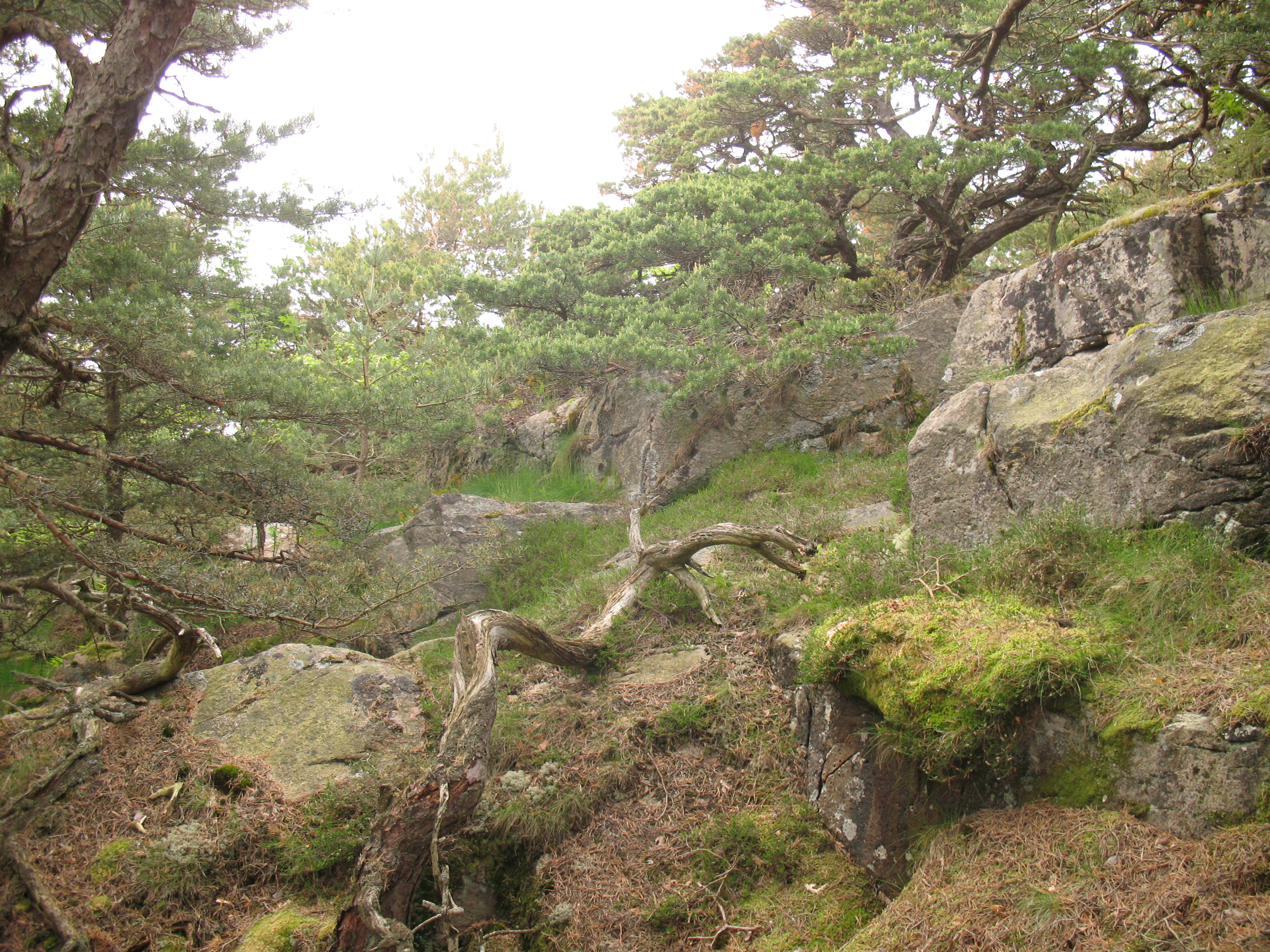
Särö Västerskog in 2007.

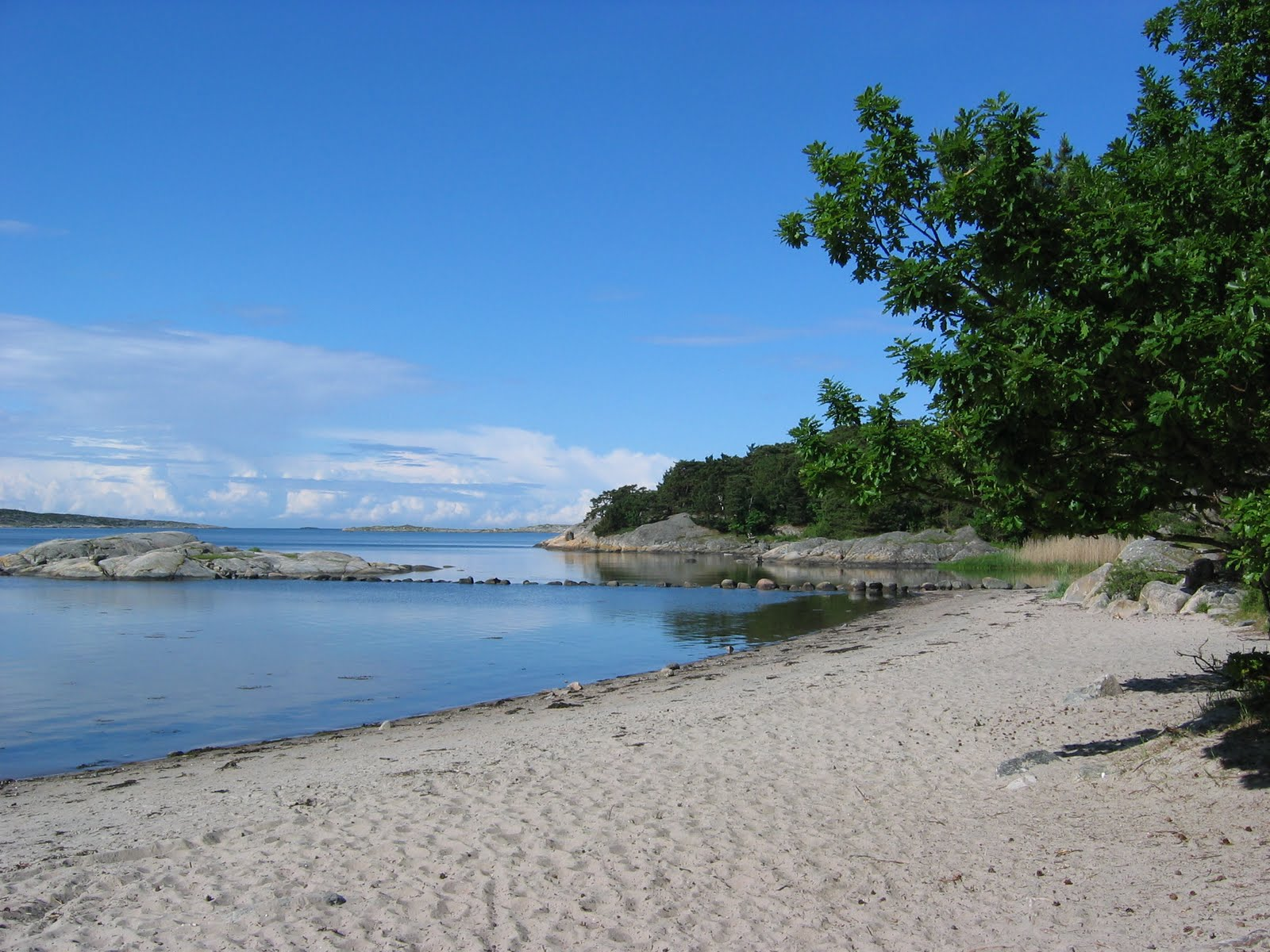
A beach in Särö Västerskog.

Särö Västerskog is a nature reserve located in Kungsbacka Municipality, Sweden, on a peninsula west of the locality of Särö. It was established in 1974 and is currently part of the Natura 2000 ecological network.

The reserve has an area of 55 hectares; it is mostly covered with forest, but there are also pastures and beaches, as well as graves from the Nordic Bronze Age. The most common trees are oak and pine, some of which are 200–300 years old. In 1914, a pine tree with 480 growth rings was found - probably the oldest known pine in Halland. Furthermore, the reserve houses the largest population of the common yew in Sweden.

55 species in the IUCN Red List have been found in the reserve, including many lichens and beetles.
