= Kungsbackaån =

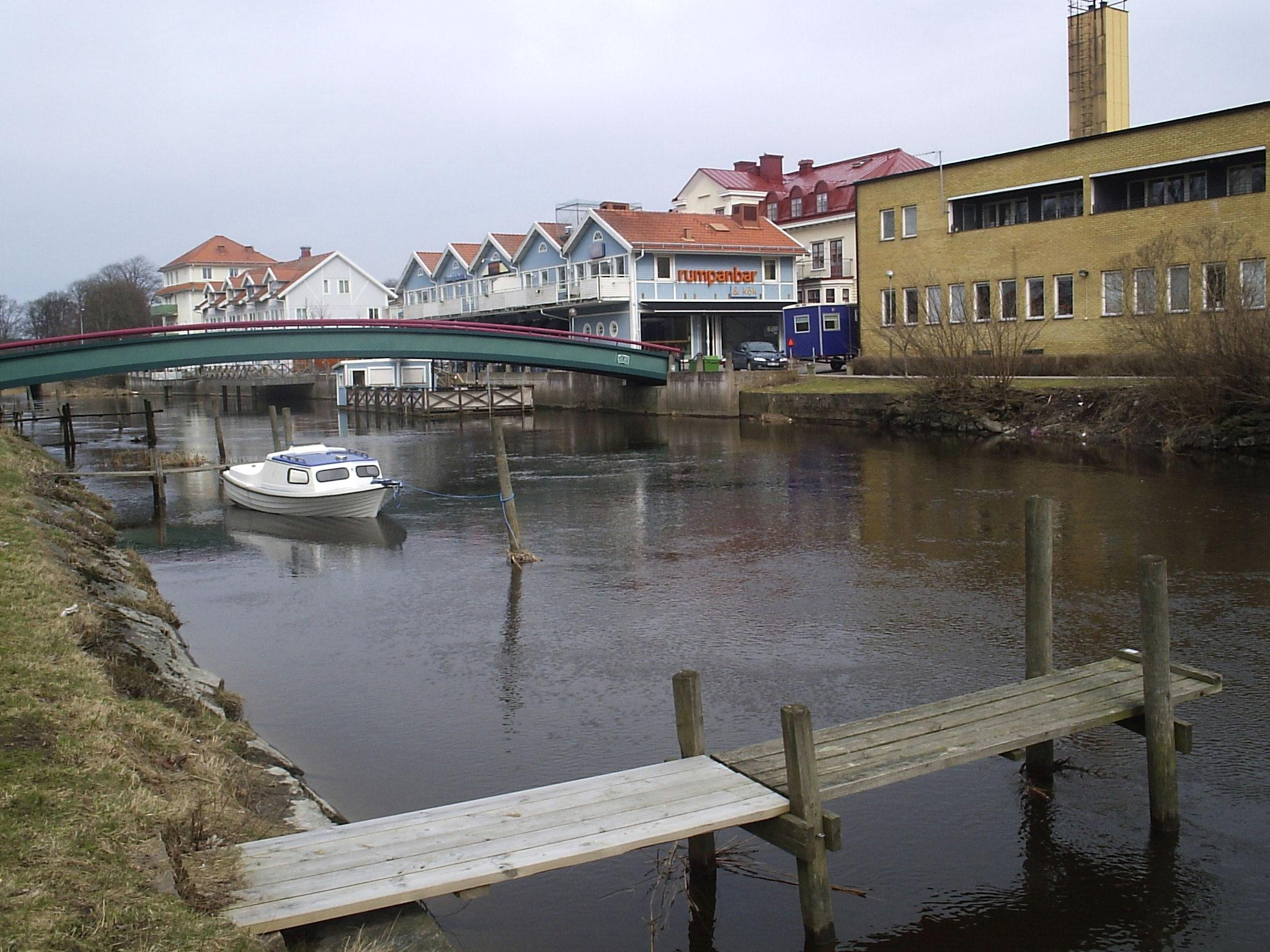
- Kungsbackaån in April 2006

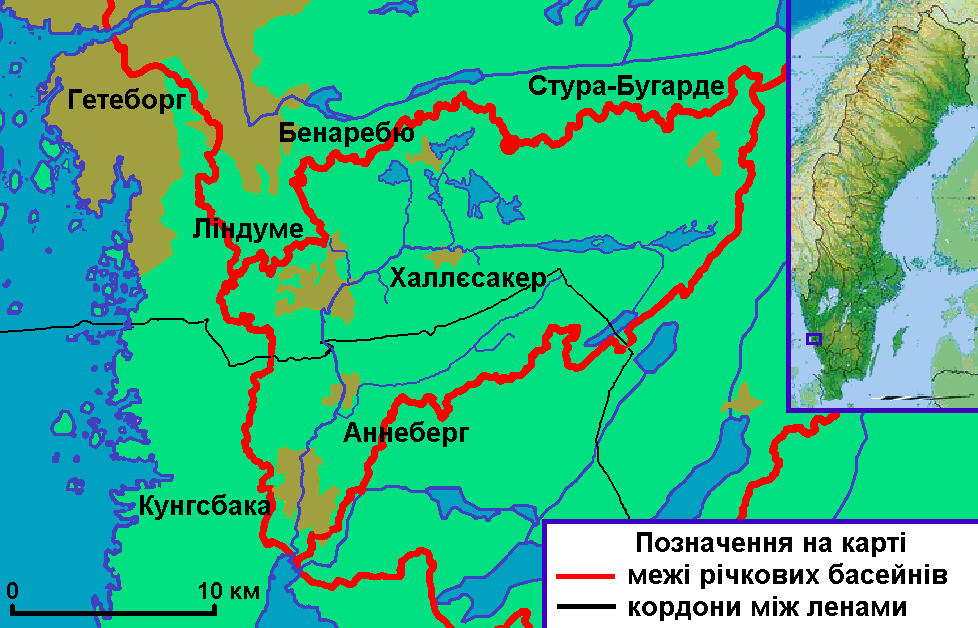
- Map of Kungsbackaån's drainage basin.

Location
- Country: Sweden

Physical characteristics
- Mouth: Kungsbackafjorden in Kattegat
  - coordinates: 57°27′10″N 12°03′40″E
- Length: 45 km (28 mi)
- Basin size: 301.9 km^{2} (116.6 sq mi)

Kungsbackaån is a river in Sweden. It is located in Halland County.
