= Hjälmared, Kungsbacka =

Hjälmared
- Location within Halland Location within Sweden
- Coordinates: 57°32′N 12°09′E
- Country: Sweden
- Province: Halland
- County: Halland County
- Municipality: Kungsbacka Municipality

Area
  - Total: 0.89 km^{2} (0.34 sq mi)

Population (31 December 2010)
  - Total: 360
  - Density: 403/km^{2} (1,040/sq mi)
- Time zone: UTC+1 (CET)
  - Summer (DST): UTC+2 (CEST)

Hjälmared is a locality situated in Kungsbacka Municipality, Halland County, Sweden, with 360 inhabitants in 2010.
