= Kungsbacka Fjord =

Fjord in Halland County, Sweden

Coordinates: 57°24′4″N 12°3′22″E

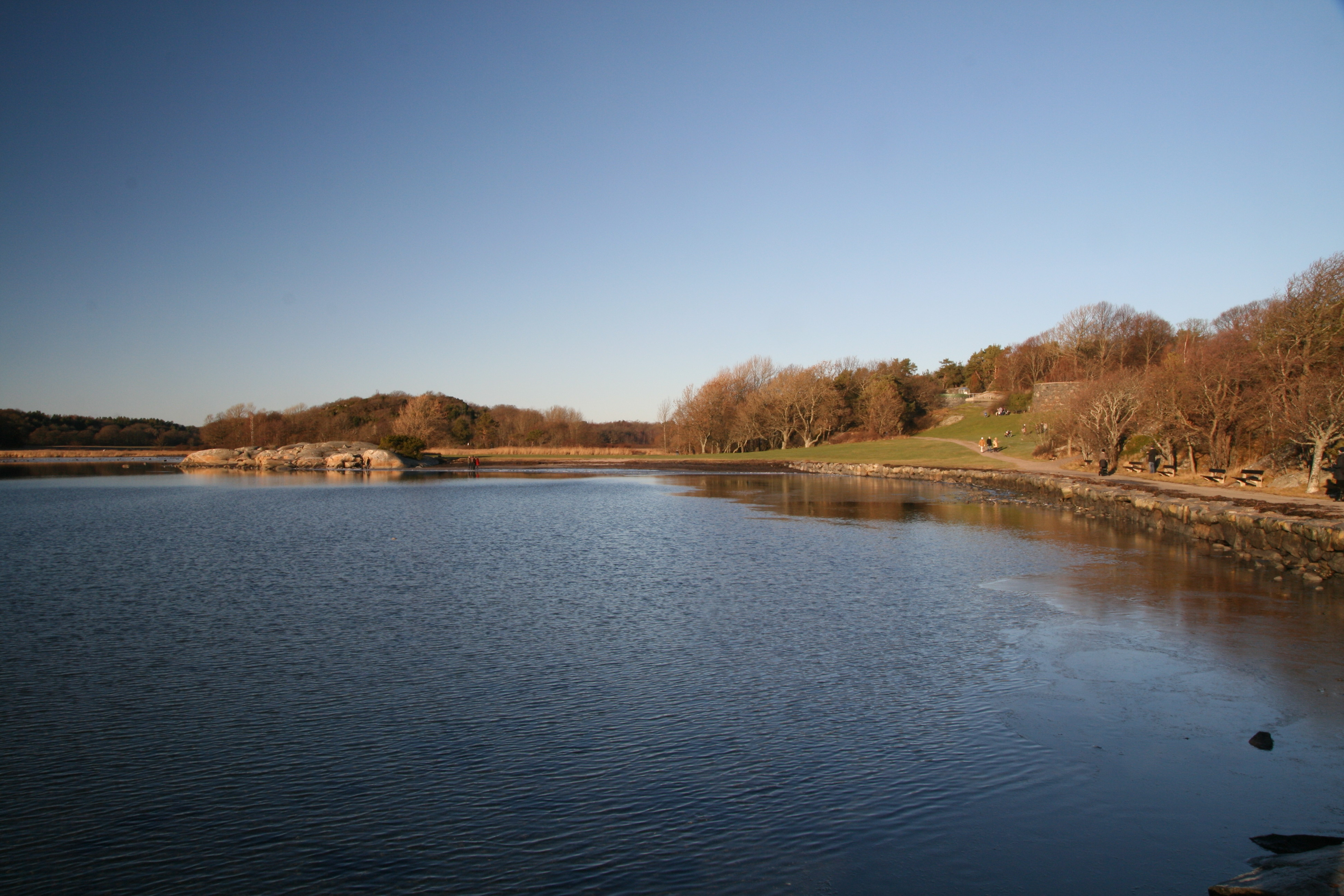
The shore of the Kungsbacka Fjord, close to the Tjolöholm Castle.

The Kungsbacka Fjord (Swedish: Kungsbackafjorden) is a fjord and a nature reserve in Halland County, western Sweden. The fjord is about 10 km long. It is delimited to the west by the Onsala Peninsula and to the east by the parish of Fjärås. The rivers Rolfsån and Kungsbackaån empty out into the fjord, which in turn opens to the Kattegat.

The Kungsbacka Fjord Nature Reserve (Swedish: Kungsbackafjordens naturreservat), established in 2005, has an area of 5200 hectares and is included in the Natura 2000 network. More than 240 bird species have been noted, including the common redshank, the yellow wagtail, the tufted duck and the rare smew.
