= Halla Heberg =

- Location within Halland Location within Sweden
- Coordinates: 57°27′N 11°58′E
- Country: Sweden
- Province: Halland
- County: Halland County
- Municipality: Kungsbacka Municipality

Area
  - Total: 0.46 km^{2} (0.18 sq mi)

Population (31 December 2010)
  - Total: 518
  - Density: 1,120/km^{2} (2,900/sq mi)
- Time zone: UTC+1 (CET)
  - Summer (DST): UTC+2 (CEST)

Halla Heberg is a locality situated in Kungsbacka Municipality, Halland County, Sweden, with 518 inhabitants in 2010.
