= History of IFK Göteborg =

Swedish football club history

Idrottsföreningen Kamraterna Göteborg, officially IFK Göteborg Fotboll, commonly known as IFK Göteborg, is a Swedish professional football club based in Gothenburg IFK Göteborg (sports club).

== 1895–1904 ==
IFK Göteborg's first kit, which was used in 1904 and 1905. White shorts were also sometimes used, and there was no standard sock colour.

The first IFK association in Gothenburg was founded in 1895, with Oscar Lagerstedt as chairman. It was short-lived, although it has been confirmed that it founded a small-bore rifle shooting challenge prize in the winter of 1896. The next attempt to found an IFK club in Gothenburg was made on 5 September 1897, when two brothers named Friman, Eric Clase and Anton Johansson reconstructed the club. The club was active until at least 1899, but after that no information can be found that confirms the club still existed. During those years, the main activity was athletics, and for a short time in 1899, four-time Olympic gold medalist Eric Flemming was active in the club.

There was no further activity of any IFK association in Gothenburg between 1900 and 1904. The present-day IFK Göteborg was founded when Arthur "Lång-Arthur" Andersson, John Säwström, and two students at Chalmers University of Technology, Arthur Wingren and Stellan Ljungberg, wanted to start an IFK club in Gothenburg. The idea came to their minds after reading a news-item which expressed confusion as to why the second largest city in Sweden still did not have an IFK association. Late in the evening of 2 October 1904, it was decided to start the club, and two days later on 4 October, IFK Göteborg became the 39th IFK association. Committees for football, hockey and parties were also founded at the meeting. One of the important initial questions raised was uniform colour. As with almost all IFK clubs, the colors decided on were blue and white. It was also decided that the uniform should consist of blue and white vertically striped jerseys, with blue shorts. The ownership group however lacked the financial resources to buy that kind of striped jersey, so blue ones with a single horizontal white stripe were used instead.

== 1904–19 ==
The first match ever played ended in a 4–1 victory against IK Viking, a club from the local area. The foundation of IFK Göteborg was important for the development of football in the city, as until that point, Örgryte IS (ÖIS), the largest of the area clubs, had dominated the scene. IFK Göteborg represented some needed competition, although ÖIS initially maintained its traditional dominance (up until 1907, IFK only drew once and were outscored by 79–12). IFK also competed in the IFK association competition, but lost to IFK Stockholm in the finals.

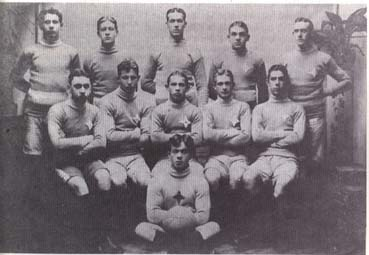
IFK Göteborg anno 1905.

ÖIS, a dominant and impressive team in Swedish football, outclassed IFK in almost all their meetings the first years. On 13 October 1907, IFK Göteborg, however, became the first Swedish team in a four years long spell to stop their win streak. IFK Göteborg also won the local league in Gothenburg. It is conjectured that this probably lead to the decision by the district board to disqualify IFK Göteborg. However, the Swedish Football Association disagreed with the decision and subsequently revoked it. IFK won the Swedish Championships for the first time in 1908 by winning the cup tournament Svenska Mästerskapet, and three players from the club were selected to play for Sweden in the first game played by the Sweden national team. IFK player Erik Börjesson scored the historic first goal. IFK finished the season by playing against international teams for their first time, the Danish clubs Østerbro BK and Boldklubben af 1893.

In 1910, the club finished third in the first season of Svenska Serien ever played, although the club was declared Swedish Champions as they won Svenska Mästerskapet. The team played its first game ever using their blue and white striped jerseys. The team played 1–1 in a game in 1912 against what became the Swedish Olympic team, and the newspapers in Stockholm nominated IFK Göteborg as "the best Swedish football club ever". The club acted as the national team the next year, where they played Norway to a 1–1 draw. This marked both the first and last time that the Sweden national team was represented by only one club.

The first big scandal in Swedish football occurred in 1914 when several players, leaders, and supporters from IFK and ÖIS started a fight in the 1/8-final of Svenska Mästerskapet. Two years later, in 1916, IFK moved to its new home stadium Gamla Ullevi. Due to the long-standing conflict between the clubs from Gothenburg, Stockholm and the SvFF, the national team between 1913 and 1916 was composed of players from both Stockholm and Gothenburg, but never simultaneously. IFK Göteborg won Svenska Serien for the fifth consecutive season in 1917, but the ongoing war and the Spanish flu led to the dissolution of the competition. As a replacement, a private competition called Fyrkantserien was started in 1918, and IFK also won that competition, which was dissolved the next year.

== 1920–39 ==
Blue-white stripes have been used on the home kit since 1910 with only very small variations. This variant was common during the 1920s and 1930s.

The club, with its 875 members started the new decennium by beating both local rivals GAIS and ÖIS in Svenska Mästerskapet, but lost in the semi-finals against Djurgårdens IF. The club gained its first official coach in 1921, Alexander Brody from Hungary. Svenska Serien was played again that year, IFK finishing fifth, but the league was dissolved again in 1924. After another conflict with the SvFF, the three clubs composing the Gothenburg-alliance, IFK, ÖIS and GAIS, boycotted the Swedish Championship tournament, Svenska Mästerskapen, in 1923.

The first Swedish official national league, Allsvenskan, was started in the autumn of 1924. The same year as the legendary Filip "Svarte-Filip" Johansson made his debut for IFK Göteborg. IFK's debut in Allsvenskan was played against Malmö FF and ended in a 1–1 draw. The club finished second, but "Svare-Filip" scored 39 goals in 22 games and won the top-scoring league. The next five seasons, IFK never finished worse than fourth, but also never won the league. Swedish football was still dominated by the three big clubs from Gothenburg, IFK, ÖIS and GAIS.

The 30s started as the 20s ended, with a lot of second and third places, but no win. The 1932–33 season ended with "Svarte-Filip" retiring, having reached a total of 177 goals in 181 Allsvenskan games, and totalling 329 goals for IFK. IFK finally won its first Allsvenskan title in the spring of 1935 after eight silver and bronze medals since the league start. As the only Swedish football club, IFK and its players boycotted the 1936 Summer Olympics held in Berlin, Nazi Germany. Swedish football was no longer dominated by teams from Gothenburg in the latter half of the thirties, with both IFK Göteborg and GAIS being relegated in 1937–38, although IFK was promoted back to Allsvenskan the next season. Back in the highest division, IFK finished second as it was decided to finish the league, even after the breakout of World War II.

== 1940–69 ==
Mobilization affected the clubs as many players were doing their military service. Gunnar Gren (later A.C. Milan) made his debut in IFK as they won the league in 1941–42. The rest of the 40s were a sad time for the supporters of the club and the decade was ended by IFK being relegated from Allsvenskan for the second time. The only light in the dark was Gunnar Gren, being the top scorer in 1946–47 and was together with Gunnar Nordahl playing in a 'Rest of Europe' team against England at Wembley. He was also awarded Guldbollen as the best player in Sweden, and won an Olympic Games gold medal with the Swedish team in 1948.

IFK was promoted to Allsvenskan after one season in Division 2. They barely avoided relegation in 1954–55. The talented Bertil "Bebben" Johansson played for IFK and scored 27 goals when they won the long season league played autumn 1957 to autumn 1958. This was done as Sweden changed system from autumn/spring to spring/autumn. IFK competed in a European cup (the European Champion Clubs' Cup) for the first time, being eliminated in the second round. The still unbeaten Allsvenskan record attendance of 52,194 was set when IFK played ÖIS on Nya Ullevi in 1959.

IFK Göteborg gained the nickname "Änglarna" (the Angels) when a newspaper seller coined the name after seeing a heavenly freekick being shot by "Bebben". The training ground "Kamratgården" was built and opened in 1961. One of the founders, John Säwström died in 1962. The 60s were not very kind to the club, with IFK finishing in the middle of the league almost every year, even with "Bebben" as coach. The legendary Bengt "Fölet" Berndtsson retired in 1967, after setting the record for most matches played for IFK, 598. The team surprisingly won Allsvenskan in 1969.

== 1970–89 ==
1970 was the darkest year in the history of IFK. After having won the league the year before, the team was relegated after losing the last game in the series against Örebro SK. 4,000 angry IFK supporters stormed the field in the last few minutes of the game and vandalized the field and the goals, trying to get a re-match. After a big fight between the police and the hooligans, it was decided that the end score should stand. IFK was also eliminated in the first round in the European Cup. After three seasons in the second league, IFK had bought 34 players, but still had not won Division 2 and be promoted back to Allsvenskan. In 1975, still playing in the second league, IFK bought Torbjörn Nilsson and Ove Kindvall. Torbjörn Nilsson showed the way and IFK was promoted to Allsvenskan in 1976. A newspaper arranged a poll, showing that 60% of the people in Gothenburg supported IFK, 25% supported Örgryte IS and 15% GAIS. A new record was set for Swedish Division 2 football when 50,690 persons watched IFK-GAIS at Ullevi.

The first season in Allsvenskan this decade ended with a sixth place, having bought many good players, including Ralf Edström, Glenn Holm and Tommy Holmgren. In 1978, IFK hired the coach Sven-Göran Eriksson, previously only having minor successes in lower leagues, to make IFK Göteborg a top team once again. He introduced the 4-4-2 system with "pressure and support", a system that was going to give IFK great success later on. The 70s ended with a second place in Allsvenskan and the first gold medal in Svenska Cupen.

After reinforcing the team with several good players, amongst them Glenn Hysén, Glenn Strömberg and the goalkeeper Thomas Wernerson, IFK finished second in the league and reached the quarter-finals in the UEFA Cup after beating Haka Valkeakoski, Sturm Graz and Rapid București. 1982 became a turbulent season, as the whole board was replaced, and the club almost going bankrupt, having to loan money from the supporter club to be able to go to Valencia and play the quarter-final in the UEFA Cup. After the troublesome start, IFK won everything they could win that year, including Allsvenskan, Svenska Cupen, and the UEFA Cup, after beating Valencia and Kaiserslautern on the way, and defeating Hamburger SV in the finals.

After the European success, many players went abroad and split the team. IFK still fielded a strong team and won gold in both the league (1983 and 1984) and the cup (1983). IFK also played in the European Cup and reached the quarter-finals a consecutive season. In 1986, the team advanced even further, but was eliminated in the semi-finals after 3–0 at home and 0–3 away and then being defeated after penalties against FC Barcelona. A new team of talents made the impossible and won both the UEFA Cup and Allsvenskan once again in 1987, after beating Dundee United in the finals. The later years of the 80s showed an old team that needed new talent. After finishing seventh in the league, the new junior coach Roger Gustafsson was promoted.

== 1990–99 ==
Gustafsson could not in the premiere of the 1990 Allsvenskan have gotten a worse start than 0–6 against IFK Norrköping. Using many youth players got him heavily criticized by the press. However, in the next game, a 5–0 victory against AIK showed them that Gustafsson was doing the right thing. After a good autumn, IFK once again won Allsvenskan. It was also decided to return to the 1916 arena Gamla Ullevi. IFK won the league and the cup in 1991, and Gustafsson became a hero. 1992 ended with a fifth place in Allsvenskan, but good results in the UEFA Champions League, beating PSV Eindhoven twice and FC Porto once, finishing second in their group after A.C. Milan.

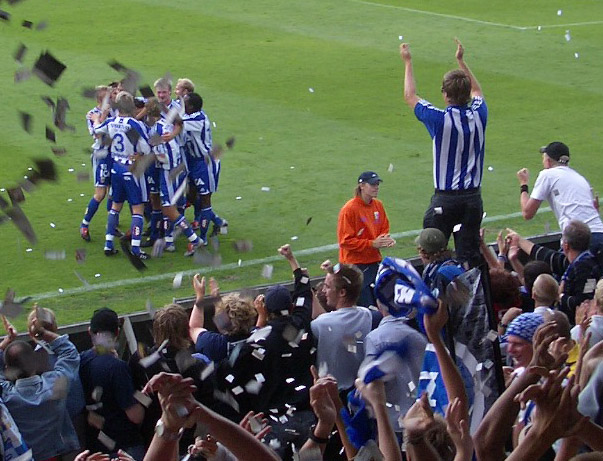
IFK Göteborg and fans celebrate a goal against Örebro SK in 2004.

IFK won Allsvenskan in 1993, Sweden's record 14th successive title, and once again qualified for international play. IFK advanced to the group stage of the Champions League by beating Sparta Prague. The group consisted of FC Barcelona, Manchester United and Galatasaray. No one really believed that IFK would progress to the quarter-final stage, until they beat Galatasaray twice, and Manchester United and Barcelona once, plus one loss and one draw, IFK Göteborg won the group; Bayern Munich was next.

The 1995 season quarter-finals started against Bayern Munich, ending in two draws (0–0 in Munich and 2–2 at home). IFK was eliminated due to fewer away goals. IFK won the league for the third consecutive season, but was eliminated in the first round of the Champions League by Legia Warszawa, and the fantastic career of Roger Gustafsson ended. IFK hooligans in the qualification to the Champions League would suffer IFK as punishment having to play their next "home" match at least 250 kilometers away from Gothenburg.

Despite Gustafsson's departure, IFK continued to play well with new coach Mats Jingblad, and won Allsvenskan 1996 for the fourth consecutive season, and thus qualified for the Champions League. IFK won against A.C. Milan 2–1 at home, but lost the five remaining group games. The last years of the closing millennium were a disaster, with "only" a silver in 1997 and at eighth place in 1998, after any success coming from buying several expensive players. Jingblad, fired, was replaced during the season with Reine Almkvist. Almkvist was not able to transform IFK to a winning team. He was fired during the 1999 season when the club ranking was adjusted to lower on the standings table. Never had IFK changed a coach in the mid season of any two consecutive years. His replacement Stefan Lundin was more successful and the last year of the decade ended with a sixth place.

== 2000–09 ==
The first year of the new millennium started well for IFK. The club bought the players Gustaf Andersson, Tomas Rosenqvist and Mikael Sandklef from local rival Västra Frölunda IF. IFK returned in the top of Allsvenskan at the summer but when player Stefan Landberg was injured and had to end his career, the club suffered ended at fourth place. The team was strengthened with national team defense player Pontus Kåmark and promising Martin Ericsson; hope was the team was one of the favourites for the 2001 season. IFK again started off very good but when national team midfielder Håkan Mild was injured a couple of important games were lost. Mild did a comeback at the end of the season and IFK approached the top position. But after losing two of the three last games the team once again finished at fourth place and although qualified for the UEFA cup.

The 2002 season was a disaster for IFK. Håkan Mild left the team for Wimbledon FC and IFK did not look like a appear as a title favourite as it had in previous seasons. IFK was located in the middle of the table during the summer and problems appeared. Pontus Kåmark was injured and had to retire. Financial conditions forced the sale of striker Gustaf Andersson to Helsingborgs IF. The team fell to the bottom of the table on the verge of being relegated but remained in Allsvenskan after two nervous playoff games against Västra Frölunda IF (1-1, 2-0). The UEFA Cup was humiliating, a loss to Moldavian club, Zimbru. Stefan Lundin was fired during the autumn and temporarily replaced by Roger Gustafsson. 2003 was slightly better. Håkan Mild returned from Wimbledon FC and Bo Johansson as the new coach. IFK play was inconsistent; there were wins against many of the top teams and lost and draw games against the other teams. IFK ended on a seventh place.

For the 2004 season, IFK looked very strong with the new players Niclas Alexandersson and Peter Ijeh. The team were involved in the gold fight but finished at third place. In the Swedish cup, the team made it to the final but lost against Djurgårdens IF with 3–1. With the new striker Stefan Selakovic IFK made it to the final in the first edition of the Scandinavian championship Royal League and the team again looked like a favourite for Allsvenskan 2005 with new coach Arne Erlandsen. But because of avoiding tax for the transfer of players Ijeh and Selakovic, the director Mats Persson was sentenced to jail. The club had a lot of bad attention from the media and striker Ijeh was sold to FC Copenhagen. Despite this, the club made a good season and finished at second place. Håkan Mild quit his career as a football player and became the new director. The team again looked strong for the 2006 but after selling the defense players Karl Svensson to Rangers and Oscar Wendt to FC Copenhagen the team collapsed at the end of the series and finished at 8th place. Erlansen was fired.

Few people believed that IFK could challenge for the title of the 2007 season since the squad mostly consisted of young, unknown players. But the club had a perfect mix of promising and experienced players. Defense player Ragnar Sigurdsson and striker Marcus Berg had a breakthrough and the team won the title following a title hiatus of 11 years. The team also made it to the final of the Swedish cup although they lost to Kalmar FF, 3–0. Berg scored 14 goals and was sold to Groningen at the end of the season while midfielder Tobias Hysén was bought from premier league club Sunderland FC.

2008 started well for IFK when the club won the Swedish Supercup over Kalmar FF, 3–1. But in Allsvenskan the team had some problems with the offense during the spring and lost contact with the leading team Kalmar FF. But after the club started playing with the young forward Robin Söder the team started playing well. IFK made a good effort in the qualification to Champions League but lost to FC Basel with 1-1 (home) and 2-4 (away). The loss was a big disappointment but the season ended better after winning the Swedish cup against a victory over Kalmar FF after penalties. IFK ended at 3rd place in Allsvenskan.

During the 2009 season IFK Göteborg played at the new renovated stadium Gamla Ullevi and in the opening game the club beat Djurgården with 6–0. The club made very strong result during the spring and was at the top of the allsvenskan before the summer break. During the summer the club had many injuries and a lost many points in the league. Internationally the club were defeated by Hapoel Tel Aviv in the qualification for UEFA Europa League. The club bought players Tuomo Turunen, Hannes Stiller and Theodor Elmar Bjarnason and won a lot of games during the autumn. In the last game IFK was only one point behind AIK who was the leader of allsvenkan but after a lost with 1–2 to AIK in the last game the club ended at second position of the league. In the Swedish cup IFK made it to the final but lost once again to AIK.

== 2010– ==
Before the 2010 season IFK bought the striker Pär Ericsson from local rivals GAIS. The club was one of the favourites to win the title but the series started with bad results and many injuries. IFK did very bad results during the spring when the club only won 3 matches and was just above the relegation places in the league. After the summer break the club played better but ended at 7th place after a very weak ending. During the summer Kim Christensen was sold to FC Copenhagen and Gustav Svensson was sold to Turkish champions Bursaspor. In the qualification for UEFA Europa League the club did two good matches against AZ Alkmaar but was eliminated with 1–2 in total (0-2, 1-0).

Despite the bad results from 2010 the team kept the coach Jonas Olsson for the 2011 season. IFK did not make any big changes in the squad but bought the striker Andreas Drugge from Trelleborgs FF and Hjörtur Logi Valgarðsson from Icelandic club Fimleikafélag Hafnarfjarðar. The season started terrible with 4 losses in the 4 first games. The team started winning in the late spring and summer but after losing tight games against the top teams IF Elfsborg (2-3) and Helsingborgs IF (1-2) it was clear that IFK was not going to end up in the top-4 in allsvenskan. The team finished weak and ended up in 7th place. IFK made it to the semifinal of the Swedish cup but was eliminated by Kalmar FF (3-4). During the summer players Philip Haglund and Emil Salomonsson was transferred to the club while defender Ragnar Sigurdsson was sold to FC Copenhagen and midfielder Sebastian Eriksson was sold to Cagliari Calcio.

After the disappointing 2011 season coach Jonas Olsson left the club. IFK made a controversial choice for the new coach, Mikael Stahre who coached main rivals AIK during the 2009 season. The club bought several high-profile players, goalkeeper John Alvbåge returned from Örebro SK, Brazilian midfielder Daniel Sobralense was bought from Kalmar FF, Norway national team defender Kjetil Waehler was bought from AB Aarhus, midfielder Pontus Farnerud was bought from Stabaek and midfielder Nordin Gerzic was bought from Örebro SK. The club did a good pre-season with victories over Rosenborg and Lilleström and draw against Russian team FC Spartak Moscow. IFK was favourites to win allsvenskan 2012 and was nicknamed "Real Blåvitt" (Real Bluewhite) by the media.

Allsvenskan started disastrously though with losses to Syrianska FC and IFK Norrköping and only draw against Örebro despite dominating the matches. The team seemed to recover and took 3 consecutive victories but then started again to lose points. The defence did not work well and several potential victories was lost by late equalisers. After the humiliating 0–5 away against Gefle IF the team was just a few points above the relegation limit. Old defender Mattias Bjärsmyr returned to the club and the team started to win again. With only one loss in ten games, the club secured a new contract for the 2013 season. IFK ended again up in a 7th place.

During the summer midfielder Tobias Sana was sold to AFC Ajax.

== Timeline ==
Graphical timeline of IFK Göteborg's history

== See also ==
- Football in Sweden
