= Buerås =

- Location within Halland Location within Sweden
- Coordinates: 57°26′N 11°58′E
- Country: Sweden
- Province: Halland
- County: Halland County
- Municipality: Kungsbacka Municipality

Area
  - Total: 0.57 km^{2} (0.22 sq mi)

Population (31 December 2010)
  - Total: 708
  - Density: 1,248/km^{2} (3,230/sq mi)
- Time zone: UTC+1 (CET)
  - Summer (DST): UTC+2 (CEST)

Buerås is a locality situated in Kungsbacka Municipality, Halland County, Sweden, with 708 inhabitants in 2010.
