= Vallda =

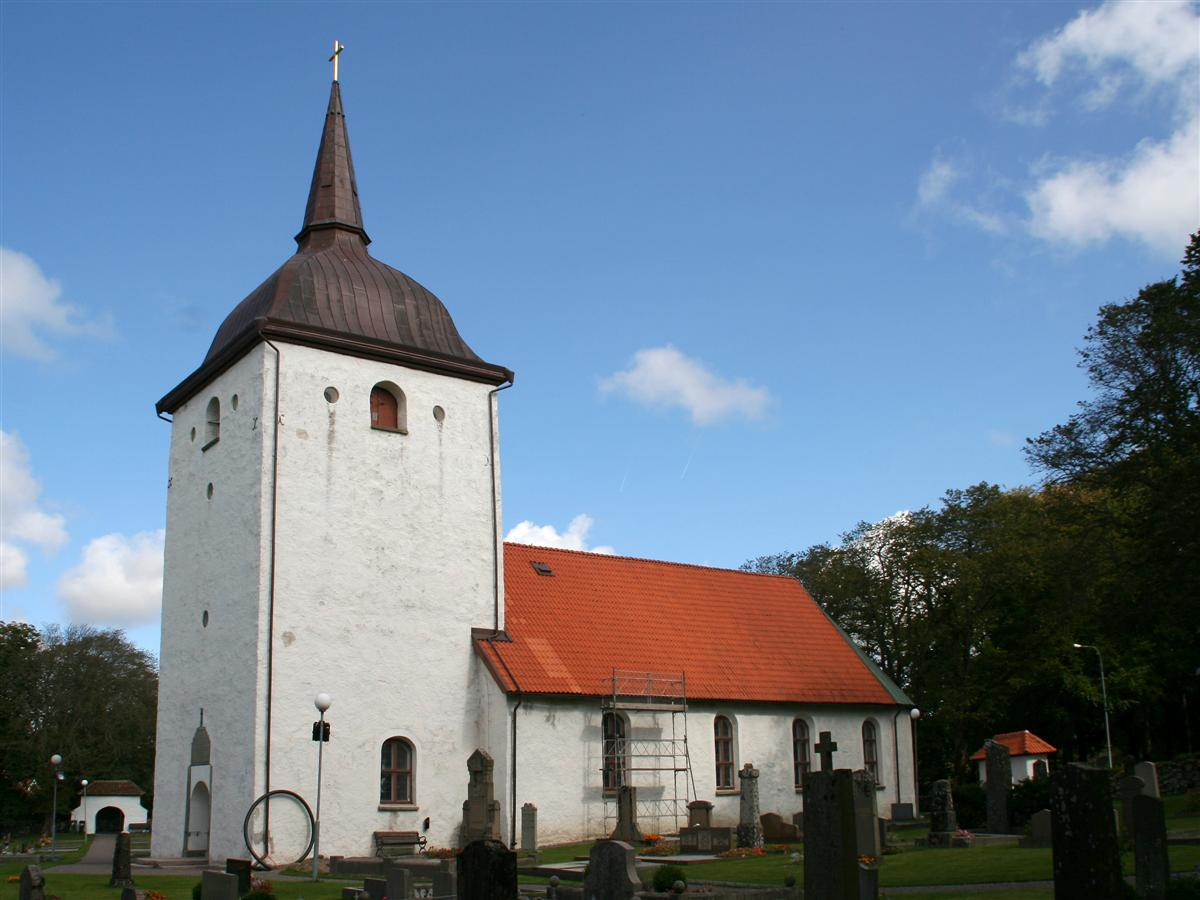
- Vallda church

- Location within Halland Location within Sweden
- Coordinates: 57°29′N 11°59′E
- Country: Sweden
- Province: Halland
- County: Halland County
- Municipality: Kungsbacka Municipality

Area
  - Total: 1.41 km^{2} (0.54 sq mi)

Population (31 December 2010)
  - Total: 1,604
  - Density: 1,136/km^{2} (2,940/sq mi)
- Time zone: UTC+1 (CET)
  - Summer (DST): UTC+2 (CEST)

Vallda is a locality situated in Kungsbacka Municipality, Halland County, Sweden, with 1,604 inhabitants in 2010. It is referenced by the Swedish group jj in their song are you still in vallda?

== Sports ==
The following sports clubs are located in Vallda:

- Lerkils IF
