= Hjälm =

- Location within Halland Location within Sweden
- Coordinates: 57°30′N 12°10′E
- Country: Sweden
- Province: Halland
- County: Halland County
- Municipality: Kungsbacka Municipality

Area
  - Total: 0.21 km^{2} (0.081 sq mi)

Population (31 December 2010)
  - Total: 242
  - Density: 1,167/km^{2} (3,020/sq mi)
- Time zone: UTC+1 (CET)
  - Summer (DST): UTC+2 (CEST)

Hjälm is a locality situated in Kungsbacka Municipality, Halland County, Sweden, with 242 inhabitants in 2010.
