= Särö =

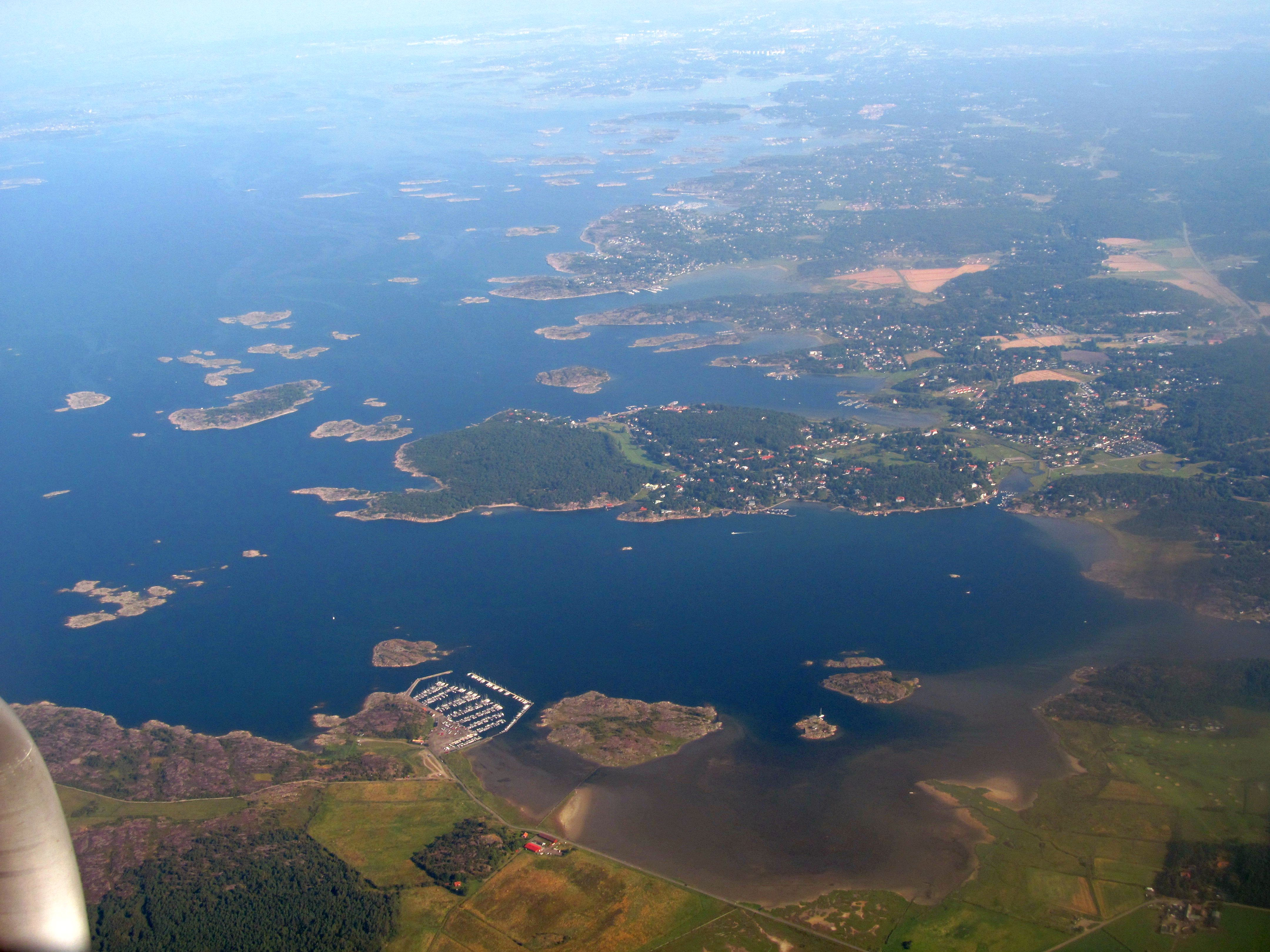
- Aerial view of Särö

- Location within Halland Location within Västra Götaland Location within Sweden
- Coordinates: 57°30′N 11°56′E
- Country: Sweden
- Province: Halland
- County: Halland
- Municipality: Kungsbacka

Area
  - Total: 4.50 km^{2} (1.74 sq mi)

Population (31 December 2010)
  - Total: 3,165
  - Density: 704/km^{2} (1,820/sq mi)
- Time zone: UTC+1 (CET)
  - Summer (DST): UTC+2 (CEST)

Särö is an area in Kungsbacka Municipality, Halland County, Sweden, with 3,165 inhabitants in 2010. It is located south of Gothenburg on the Särö peninsula. Geographically, the peninsula marks the transition from the Bohuslän archipelago in the north and the long, flat Halland coast in the south. The nature reserve Särö Västerskog is located nearby.

Originally an agricultural area, Särö became most popular during the end of the 19th century when the middle class of nearby Gothenburg started to use the peninsula as a summer resort. A railway from central Gothenburg was built, and the kings Oscar II and Gustav V frequented the area during the summer. Today, Särö is an affluent suburb of Gothenburg and Kungsbacka. Now the older part of the town of Särö is located on the peninsula of the same name and is a villa community with several centuries-old villas. Särö now has many well-located Gothenburgers which have had summer villas there.

Särö Lawn Tennisklubb is the local tennis club in Särö. It was established in 1897. King Oscar II of Sweden and Crown prince Gustaf V were frequent visitors to the club during the late 1800s through the 1900s. Today SLTK have both indoor and outdoor courts, located in different areas of Särö.
