= Västra Hagen =

- Location within Halland Location within Sweden
- Coordinates: 57°26′N 11°56′E
- Country: Sweden
- Province: Halland
- County: Halland County
- Municipality: Kungsbacka Municipality

Area
  - Total: 1.68 km^{2} (0.65 sq mi)

Population (31 December 2010)
  - Total: 969
  - Density: 577/km^{2} (1,490/sq mi)
- Time zone: UTC+1 (CET)
  - Summer (DST): UTC+2 (CEST)

Västra Hagen is a locality situated in Kungsbacka Municipality, Halland County, Sweden, with 969 inhabitants in 2010.
