= FBK =

FBK may refer to:

== Sport ==
- Basketball Federation of Kosovo (Serbian: Federata e Basketbollit e Kosovës)
- Fanny Blankers-Koen Games, a Dutch athletics competition
- Färjestads BK, a Swedish ice hockey club
- FBK Kaunas, a Lithuanian football club
- Frillesås BK, a Swedish bandy club

== Other uses ==
- Anti-Corruption Foundation (Fond borby s korruptsiyey; FBK), an international NGO founded by Russian opposition figure Alexei Navalny
- Florida Blue Key, an honor society at the University of Florida
- Führerbegleitkommando, Adolf Hitler's SS security unit
- Ladd Army Airfield, at Fort Wainwright, Fairbanks, Alaska, United States
- Shirakami Fubuki, a virtual YouTuber from the idol group Hololive

== See also ==
- Phi Beta Kappa Society (ΦΒΚ)
