= Laholm Bay Beach =

Beach in Sweden

Coordinates: 56.5276°N 12.9457°E

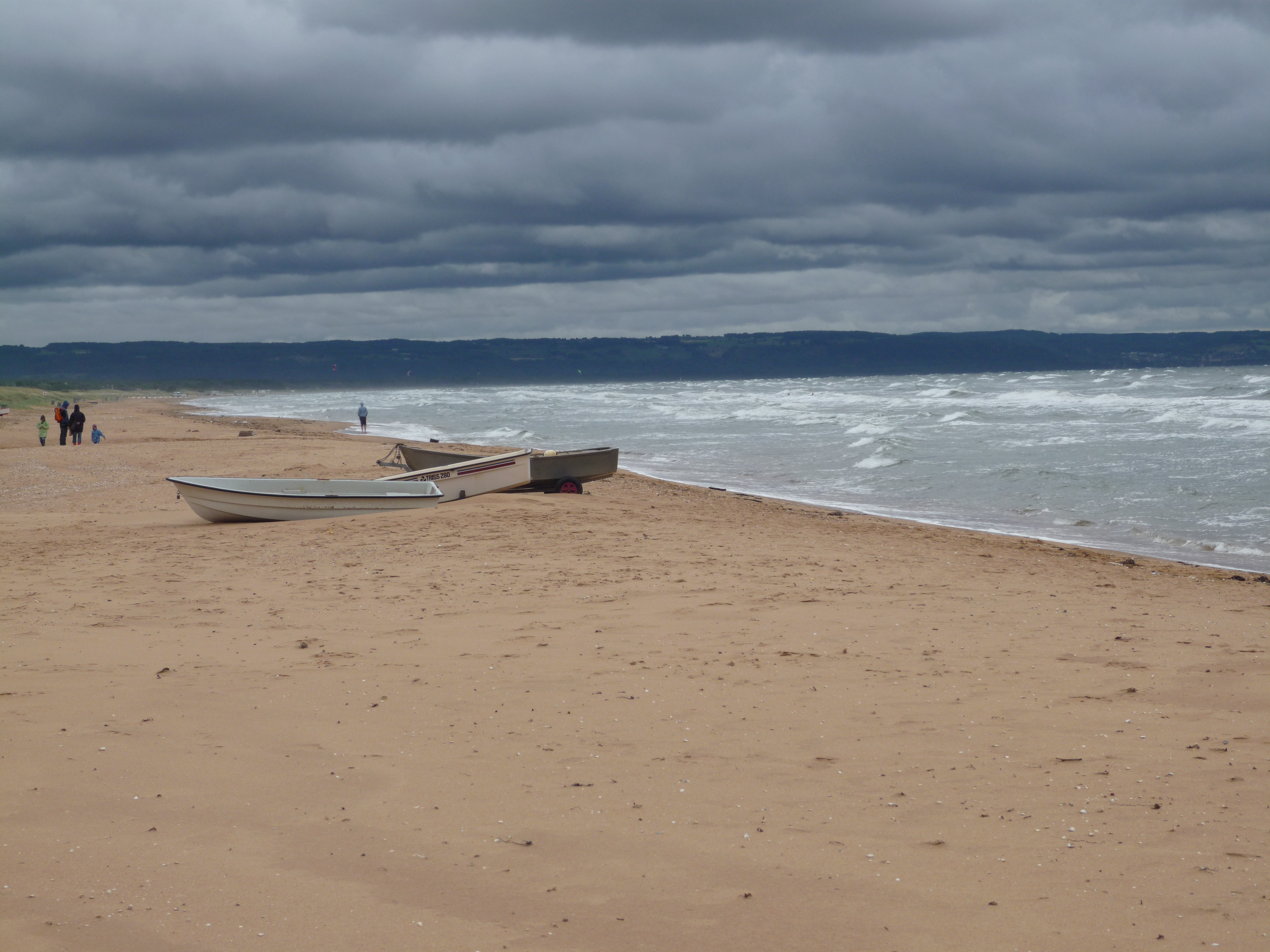
The beach in north Mellbystrand.

Laholm Bay Beach (Swedish: Laholmsbuktens strand) is the longest sandy beach in Sweden. The beach stretches from Stensån's estuary in Båstad all the way to Halmstad along the Bay of Laholm. Dunes and meadows follow the gently curved bay of 12 km. The beach is a wide, soft sandy beach and shallow and mighty dunes separate the beach from the rest of the coastal area.

The name Laholm Bay beach is used in the media as a collective name for the beach along the beach resorts Hemmeslövsstrand, Eskilstorpsstrand, Skummeslövsstrand and Mellbystrand to name a few.

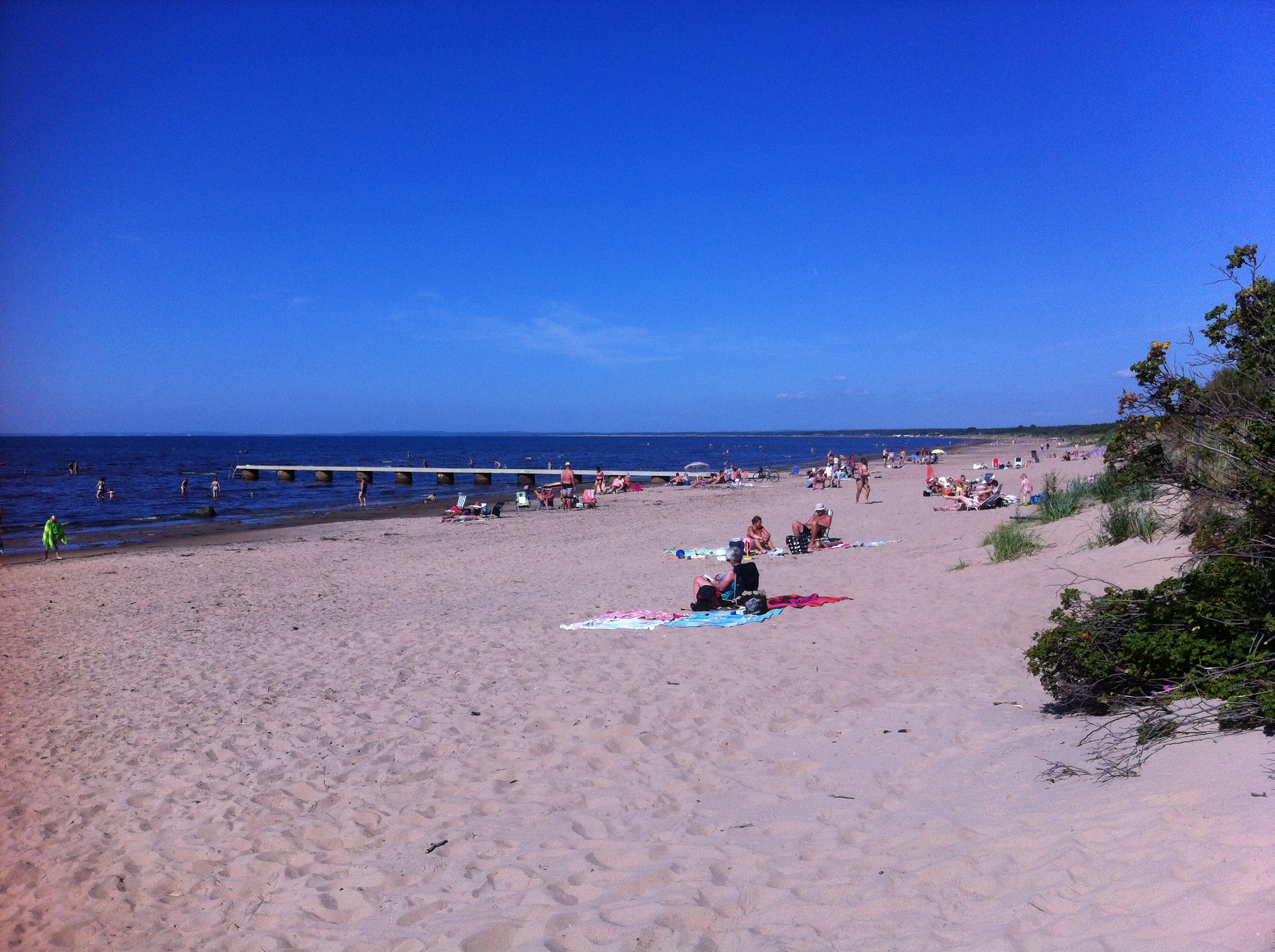
Bathing platform between Hemmeslövsstrand and Eskilstorpsstrand at Laholm Bay Beach.
