= Genevadsån =

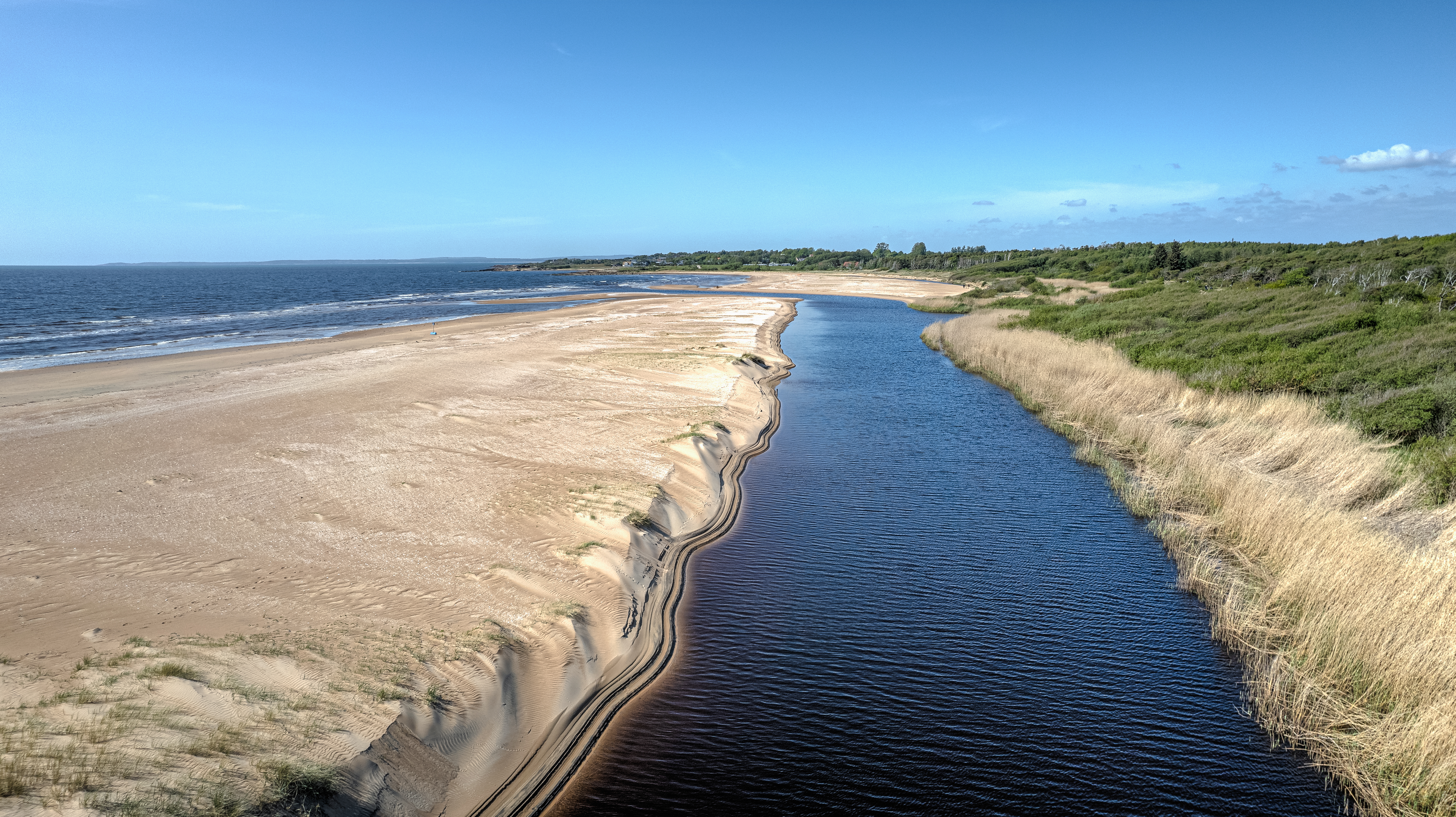

Location
- Country: Sweden
- County: Halland

Physical characteristics
- Mouth: Laholms Bay
  - location: Halmstad Municipality
  - coordinates: 56°35′10″N 12°56′15″E
- Basin size: 224.1 km^{2} (86.5 sq mi)

Genevadsån is a river in Sweden.
