= Anneberg, Kungsbacka =

Anneberg
- Location within Halland Location within Sweden
- Coordinates: 57°32′N 12°06′E
- Country: Sweden
- Province: Halland
- County: Halland County
- Municipality: Kungsbacka Municipality

Area
  - Total: 1.13 km^{2} (0.44 sq mi)

Population (31 December 2010)
  - Total: 1,469
  - Density: 1,304/km^{2} (3,380/sq mi)
- Time zone: UTC+1 (CET)
  - Summer (DST): UTC+2 (CEST)

Anneberg is a locality situated in Kungsbacka Municipality, Halland County, Sweden, with 1,469 inhabitants in 2010.
