= Laholm Bay =

Geographical feature in southern Sweden

- Laholmsbukten (Swedish)
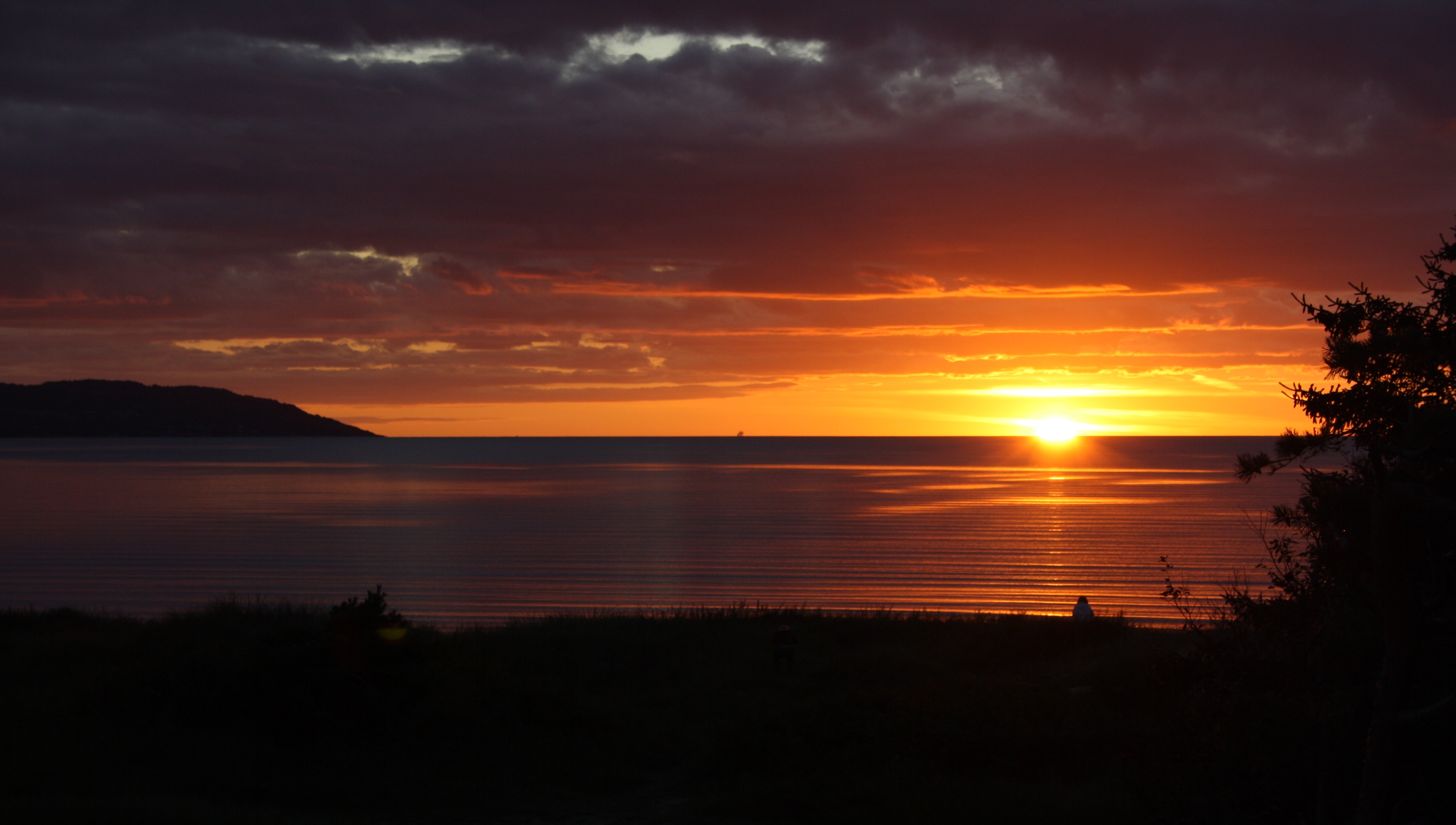

- Location within Halland Location within Sweden
- Location: Halland County and Skåne County, Sweden
- Coordinates: 56°32′N 12°47′E
- Part of: Kattegat
- Surface area: 177.8 km^{2} (68.6 sq mi)
- Average depth: 20 m (66 ft)
- Shore length^{1}: 50 km (31 mi)
- Settlements: Halmstad
- ^{1} Shore length is not a well-defined measure.

Laholm Bay (Swedish: Laholmsbukten) is a bay of the Kattegat, between Tylösand in the north and Hovs Hallar in the south. The Bjäre Peninsula, which forms its southern edge, separates it from Skälder Bay.

The border between Halland and Skåne counties reaches the bay between Båstad and Hemmeslövstrand.

The bay is shallow with an average depth of about 20 metres (66 ft) and a shoreline of about 50 kilometres (31 mi). Mighty dunes separate the beach from the rest of the coastal area. In the greater part of the bay, the bottom consists of sand and clay, with depths of 14.5 to 18 metres (48 to 59 ft). But a wide strip of rocky bottom, with depths of 12 to 18 metres (39 to 59 ft), extends south-southwestward from the northeastern part of the bay to Hovs Hallar.

Along Laholm Bay are several seaside resorts: Båstad, Hemmeslövsstrand, Eskilstorpsstrand, Skummeslövsstrand, and Mellbystrand, among others. The bay, on the other hand, is named after the Town of Laholm, located about 5 kilometres (3.1 mi) inland.

The long sandy beach was used in the past as a country road, with bus traffic to Båstad already in the 1930s.

Laholm Bay suffers from eutrophication and related algal blooms. Since the 1970s, oxygen deficiency has been observed in groundwater. The cause of the environmental issues is thought to be too much nutrients (mainly nitrogen from agriculture, forests, and rivers) in relation to the shallow water depth. As of 2005, measures to reduce the supply of nitrogen have not yielded satisfactory results.
