= Röda holme =

Röda Holme
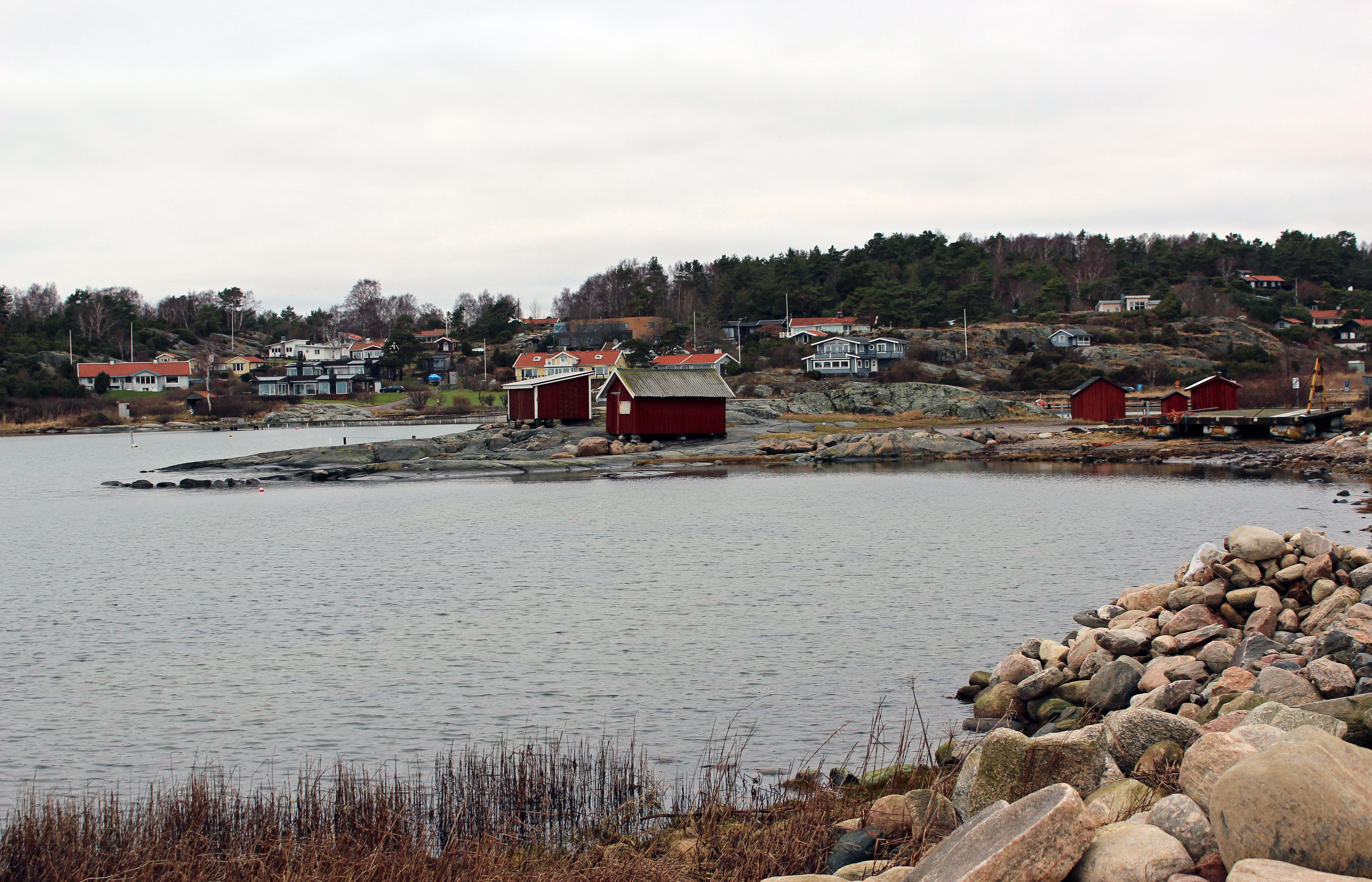
- Röda Holme in January 2012

- Location within Halland Location within Sweden
- Coordinates: 57°22′N 11°59′E
- Country: Sweden
- Province: Halland
- County: Halland County
- Municipality: Kungsbacka Municipality

Area
  - Total: 0.50 km^{2} (0.19 sq mi)

Population (31 December 2010)
  - Total: 279
  - Density: 560/km^{2} (1,500/sq mi)
- Time zone: UTC+1 (CET)
  - Summer (DST): UTC+2 (CEST)

Röda Holme is a locality situated in Kungsbacka Municipality, Halland County, Sweden, with 279 inhabitants in 2010.
