= Rolfsån =

Coordinates: 57°28′N 12°05′E

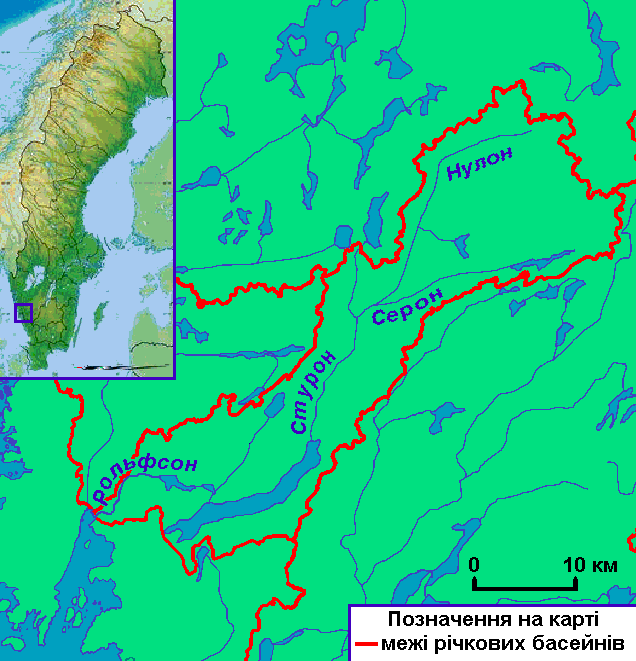
- Map of Rolfsån's drainage basin.

Location
- Country: Sweden

Physical characteristics
- Basin size: 693.7 km^{2} (267.8 sq mi)

Rolfsån is a river in Sweden, the main outflow of lake Lygnern. It empties out into the Kungsbacka Fjord.
