= Fjärås kyrkby =

- Location within Halland Location within Sweden
- Coordinates: 57°28′N 12°11′E
- Country: Sweden
- Province: Halland
- County: Halland County
- Municipality: Kungsbacka Municipality

Area
  - Total: 1.44 km^{2} (0.56 sq mi)

Population (31 December 2010)
  - Total: 2,321
  - Density: 1,614/km^{2} (4,180/sq mi)
- Time zone: UTC+1 (CET)
  - Summer (DST): UTC+2 (CEST)

Fjärås kyrkby is a locality in Kungsbacka Municipality, Halland County, Sweden, at the shore of lake Lygnern, with 2,321 inhabitants in 2010.
