= Lerkil =

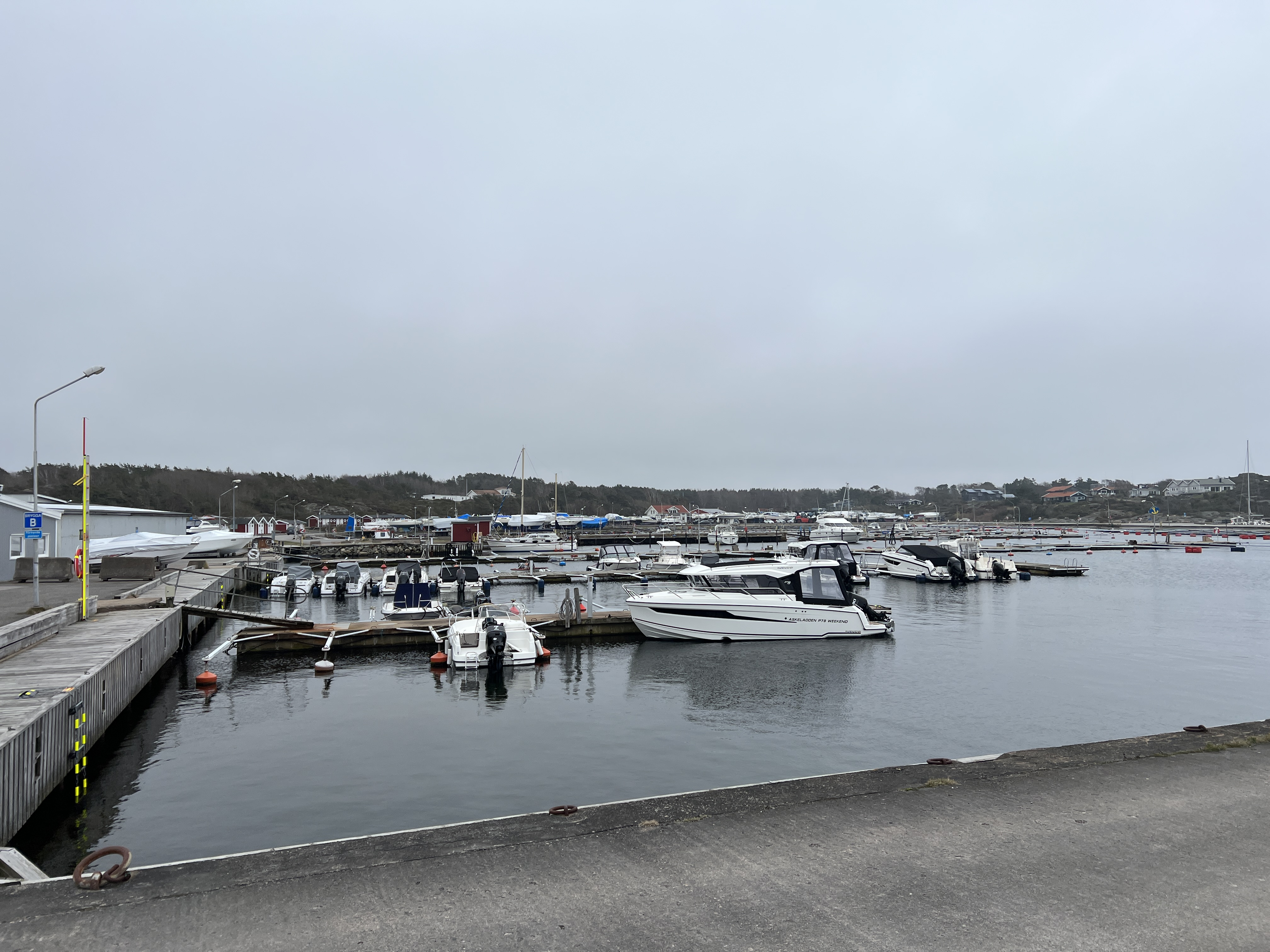

- Location within Halland Location within Sweden
- Coordinates: 57°28′N 11°55′E
- Country: Sweden
- Province: Halland
- County: Halland County
- Municipality: Kungsbacka Municipality

Area
  - Total: 1.39 km^{2} (0.54 sq mi)

Population (31 December 2010)
  - Total: 505
  - Density: 364/km^{2} (940/sq mi)
- Time zone: UTC+1 (CET)
  - Summer (DST): UTC+2 (CEST)

Lerkil is a locality situated in Kungsbacka Municipality, Halland County, Sweden, with 505 inhabitants in 2010.
