= Brattås =

- Location within Halland Location within Sweden
- Coordinates: 57°33′N 11°59′E
- Country: Sweden
- Province: Halland
- County: Halland County
- Municipality: Kungsbacka Municipality

Area
  - Total: 0.58 km^{2} (0.22 sq mi)

Population (31 December 2010)
  - Total: 384
  - Density: 662/km^{2} (1,710/sq mi)
- Time zone: UTC+1 (CET)
  - Summer (DST): UTC+2 (CEST)

Brattås is a locality situated in Kungsbacka Municipality, Halland County, Sweden, with 384 inhabitants in 2010.
