= Skälder Bay =

Bay in Skåne County, Southern Sweden

- Skälderviken (Swedish)
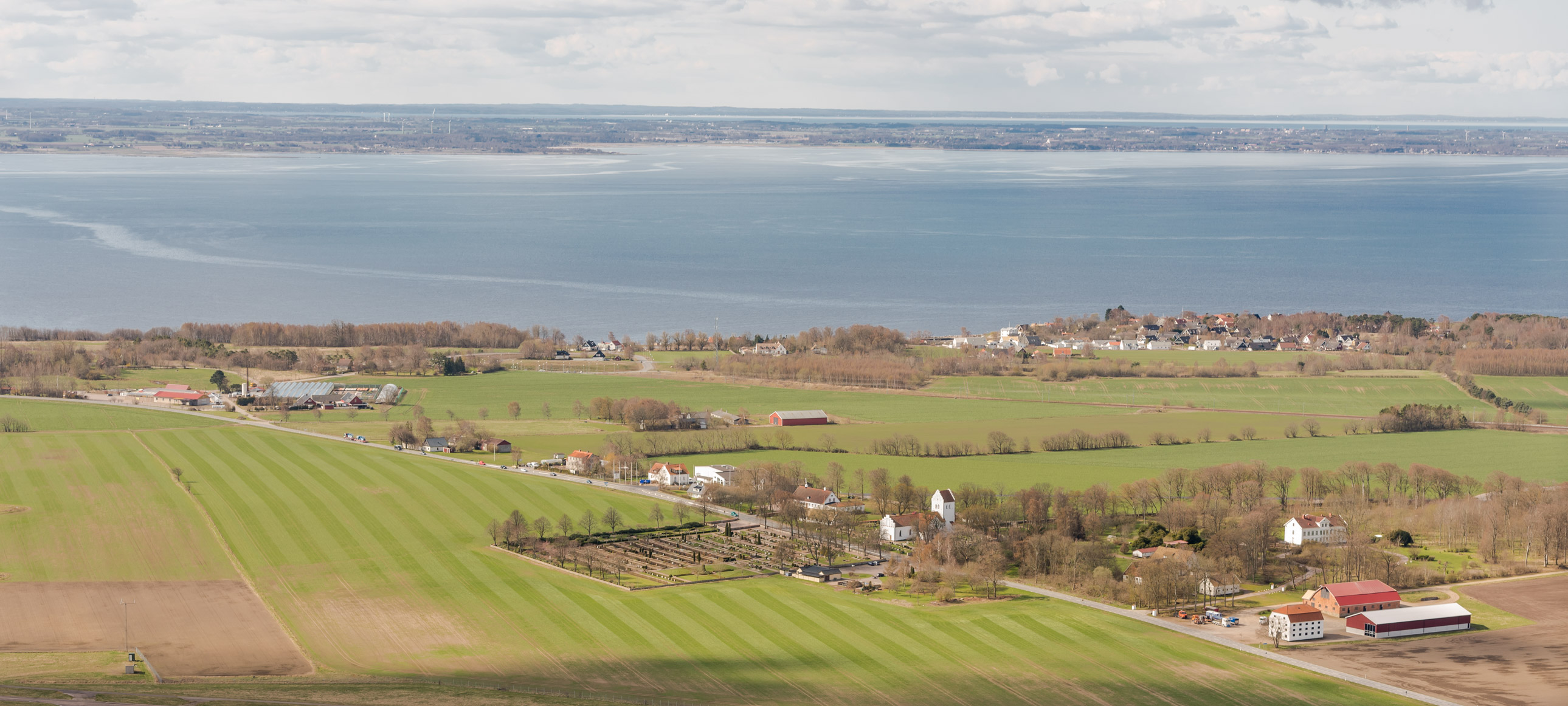
- View from the North-East

- Location within Scania Location within Sweden
- Location: Skåne County, Sweden
- Coordinates: 56°18′N 12°42′E
- Part of: Kattegat
- Designation: Ramsar
- Max. length: 23 km (14 mi)
- Max. width: 14 km (8.7 mi)
- Surface area: 92.97 km^{2} (35.90 sq mi)
- Max. depth: 25.6 m (84 ft)

Designations

Ramsar Wetland
- Official name: Skälderviken
- Designated: 14 November 2001
- Reference no.: 1127

Skälder Bay (Swedish: Skälderviken) is a bay in Skåne County, Sweden. It is an inlet of the Kattegat on the western coast of Scania, located between the Bjäre Peninsula to the north (which separates it from Laholm Bay) and the Kullen Peninsula to the south (which separates it from Øresund). The town of Ängelholm is located at the head of the bay.

Its depth at the entrance is between 20 and 25.6 metres (66 and 84 ft), gradually rising towards the head of the bay. The bottom is rocky near the northeastern and southwestern shores, but it is mostly sand and clay in the central part.

A portion of the southern shores and waters of the bay are part of the Skälderviken Ramsar site. Designated since 2001, the 1,463 hectares (3,620 acres) site is of national importance for commercial fishing, since it is an important spawning ground, nursery, and feeding area, especially for the Atlantic herring (Clupea harengus), the Atlantic cod (Gadus morhua) and flatfish species. Furthermore, a number of nationally vulnerable bird species such as the ruff (Philomachus pugnax), bar-tailed godwit (Limosa lapponica), and the common kingfisher (Alcedo atthis) breed and winter there.

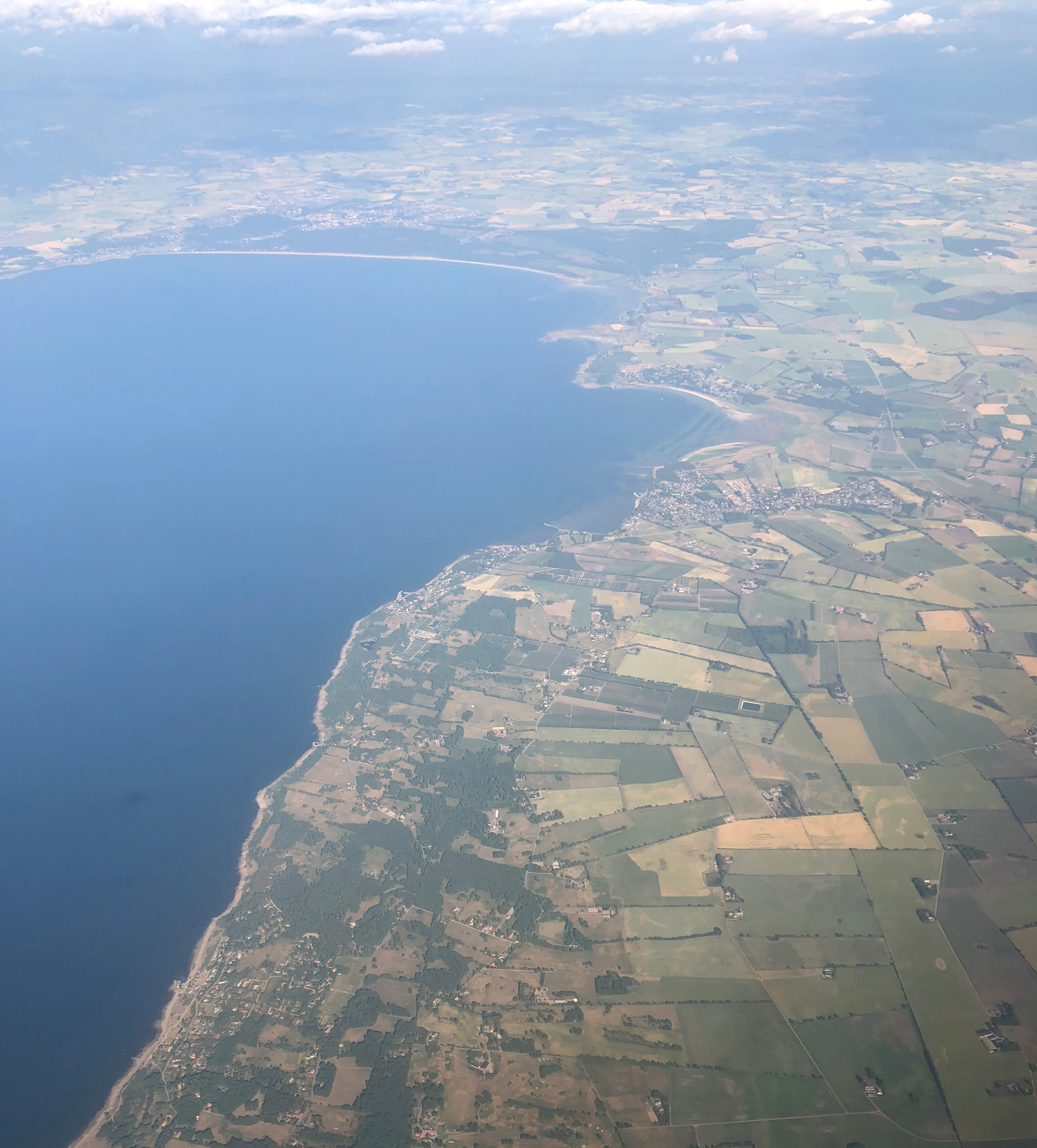
Aerial view with the Ramsar site in the center
