= Sätila =

- Location within Västra Götaland Location within Sweden
- Coordinates: 57°33′N 12°26′E
- Country: Sweden
- Province: Västergötland
- County: Västra Götaland County
- Municipality: Mark Municipality

Area
  - Total: 1.08 km^{2} (0.42 sq mi)

Population (31 December 2010)
  - Total: 1,059
  - Density: 979/km^{2} (2,540/sq mi)
- Time zone: UTC+1 (CET)
  - Summer (DST): UTC+2 (CEST)

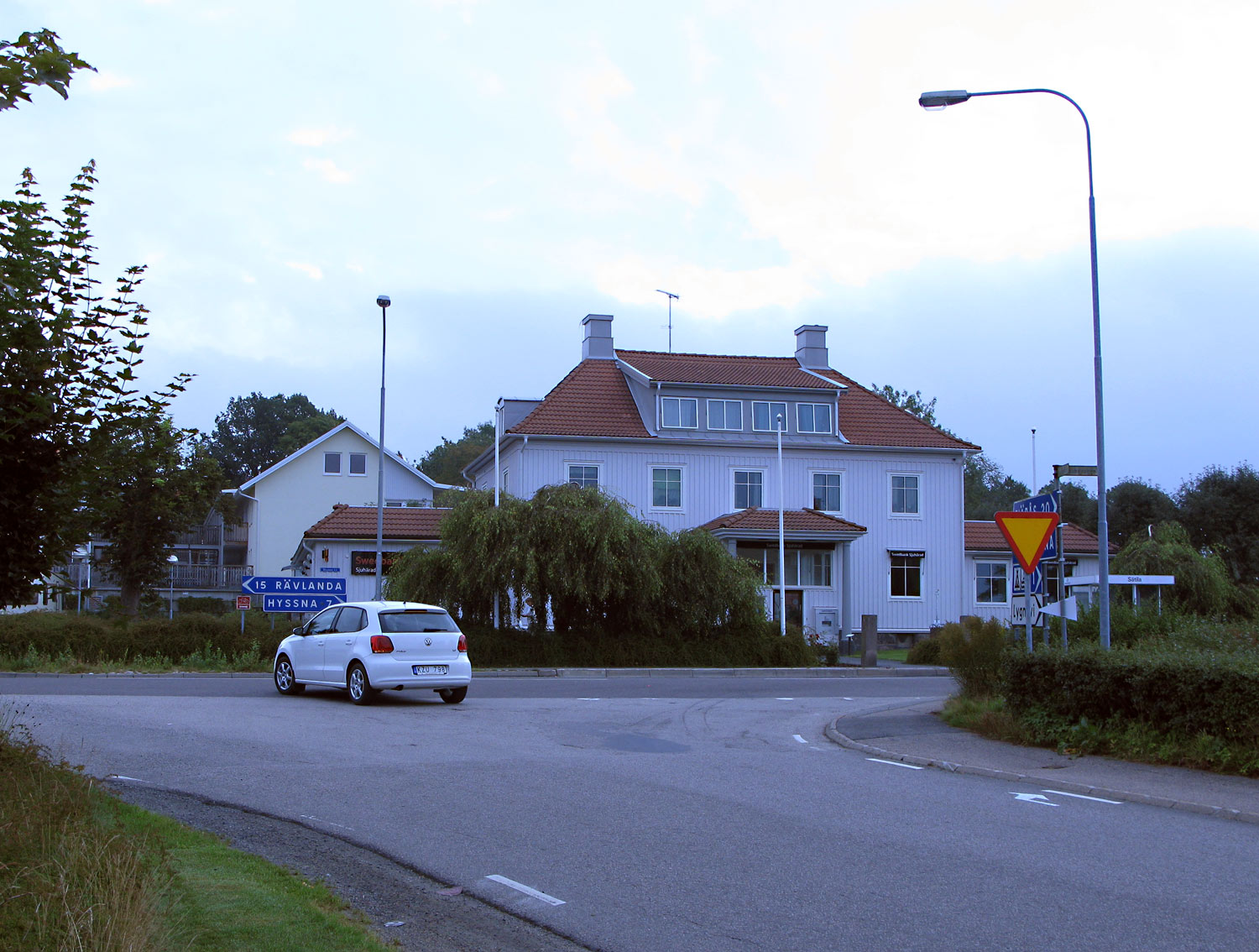
Sätila, Mark, Sweden

Sätila (Swedish pronunciation: [ˈsɛ̂ːtɪla]) is a locality situated in Mark Municipality, Västra Götaland County, Sweden. It had 1,059 inhabitants in 2010. It is located at the shore of lake Lygnern.
