= Gundal och Högås =

- Location within Halland Location within Sweden
- Coordinates: 57°33′45″N 11°58′59″E
- Country: Sweden
- Province: Halland and Västergötland
- County: Halland County and Västra Götaland County
- Municipality: Kungsbacka Municipality, Göteborg Municipality and Mölndal Municipality

Area
  - Total: 0.79 km^{2} (0.31 sq mi)

Population (31 December 2010)
  - Total: 384
  - Density: 487/km^{2} (1,260/sq mi)
- Time zone: UTC+1 (CET)
  - Summer (DST): UTC+2 (CEST)

Gundal och Högås is a trimunicipal locality situated in Kungsbacka Municipality, Halland County, and Gothenburg Municipality and Mölndal Municipality in Västra Götaland County, Sweden. It had 384 inhabitants in 2010.
