= Åsa, Kungsbacka =

Åsa
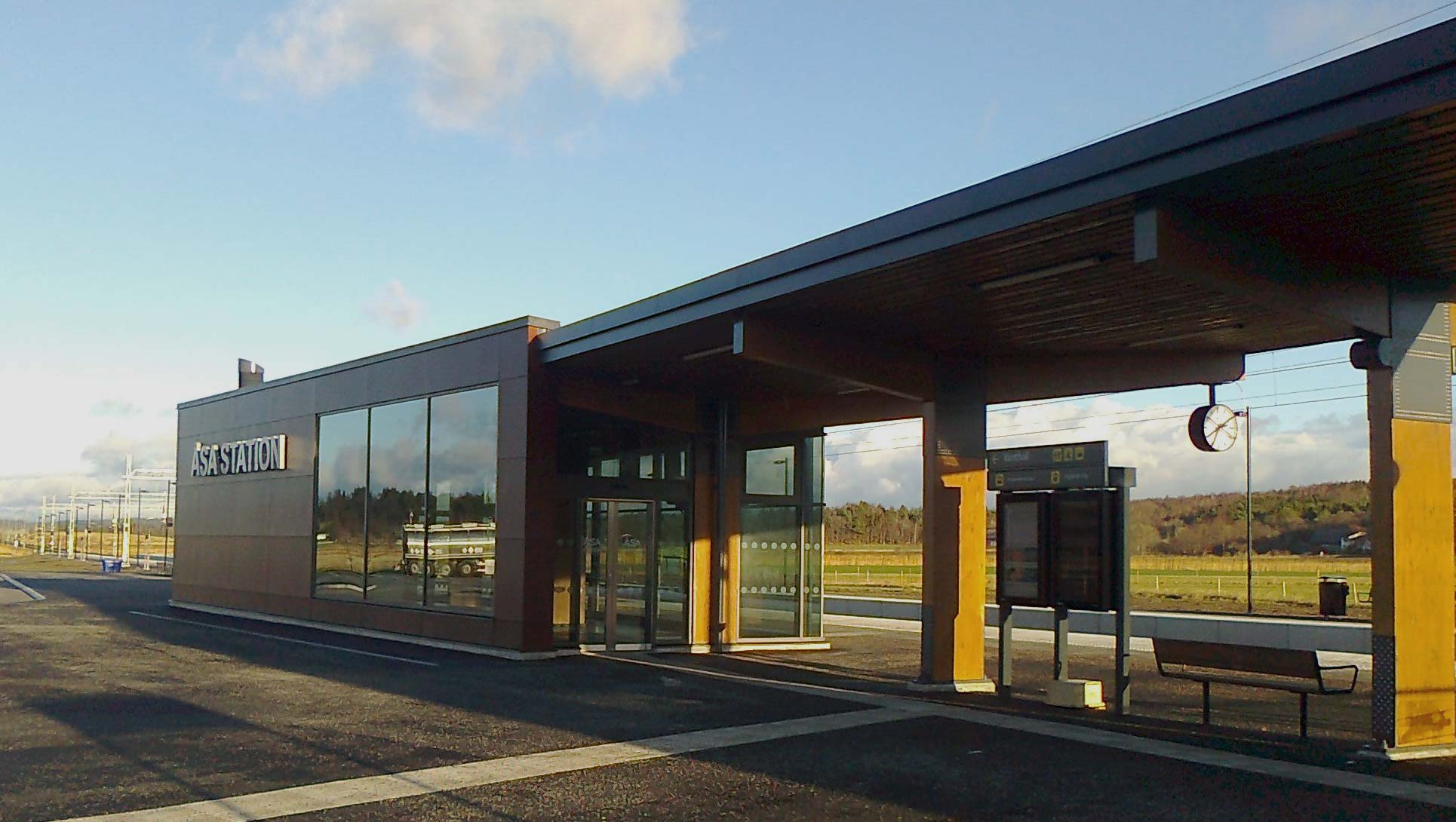
- Åsa station, 2013

- Location within Halland Location within Sweden
- Coordinates: 57°21′N 12°07′E
- Country: Sweden
- Province: Halland
- County: Halland County
- Municipality: Kungsbacka Municipality

Area
  - Total: 2.81 km^{2} (1.08 sq mi)

Population (31 December 2010)
  - Total: 6,102
  - Density: 1,197/km^{2} (3,100/sq mi)
- Time zone: UTC+1 (CET)
  - Summer (DST): UTC+2 (CEST)

Åsa is a locality in Kungsbacka Municipality, Halland County, Sweden, with 6,102 inhabitants in 2023.

== Sports ==
The following sports clubs are located in Åsa:

- Åsa IF
