= Lerkils IF =

Swedish football club

- Full name: Lerkils Idrottsförening
- Short name: LIF
- Founded: 1939
- Ground: Ledets IP (Senior teams) Ängås IP (Youth teams)
- Chairman: Sebastian Arby
- Coach: Kalle Olsson and Mattias Viggeborn (men) Tomas Grönlund (women)
- League: Division 4 Halland
Home colours	Away colours

Lerkils IF is a Swedish football club located in Vallda.

== Background ==
Lerkils IF currently plays in Division 4 Halland which is the sixth tier of Swedish football. They play their home matches at the Ledets IP in Vallda.

The club is affiliated to Hallands Fotbollförbund. In 2008 season the club played Reading F.C. in a friendly match, losing by 1–0. Lerkils IF have competed in the Svenska Cupen on 6 occasions and have played 12 matches in the competition.

== Season to season ==
Season	Level	Division	Section	Position	Movements
1993	Tier 5	Division 4	Halland	9th	
1994	Tier 5	Division 4	Halland	5th	
1995	Tier 5	Division 4	Halland	5th	
1996	Tier 5	Division 4	Halland	3rd	
1997	Tier 5	Division 4	Halland	2nd	Promotion Playoffs
1998	Tier 5	Division 4	Halland	2nd	Promotion Playoffs – Promoted
1999	Tier 4	Division 3	Nordvästra Götaland	4th	
2000	Tier 4	Division 3	Nordvästra Götaland	9th	Relegation Playoffs – Relegated
2001	Tier 5	Division 4	Halland	7th	
2002	Tier 5	Division 4	Halland	9th	
2003	Tier 5	Division 4	Halland	6th	
2004	Tier 5	Division 4	Halland	3rd	
2005	Tier 5	Division 4	Halland	6th	
2006*	Tier 6	Division 4	Halland	8th	
2007	Tier 6	Division 4	Halland	1st	Promoted
2008	Tier 5	Division 3	Sydvästra Götaland	8th	
2009	Tier 5	Division 3	Sydvästra Götaland	4th	
2010	Tier 5	Division 3	Sydvästra Götaland	11th	Relegated
2011	Tier 6	Division 4	Halland Elit	5th	

* League restructuring in 2006 resulted in a new division being created at Tier 3 and subsequent divisions dropping a level.
