= Mellbystrand =

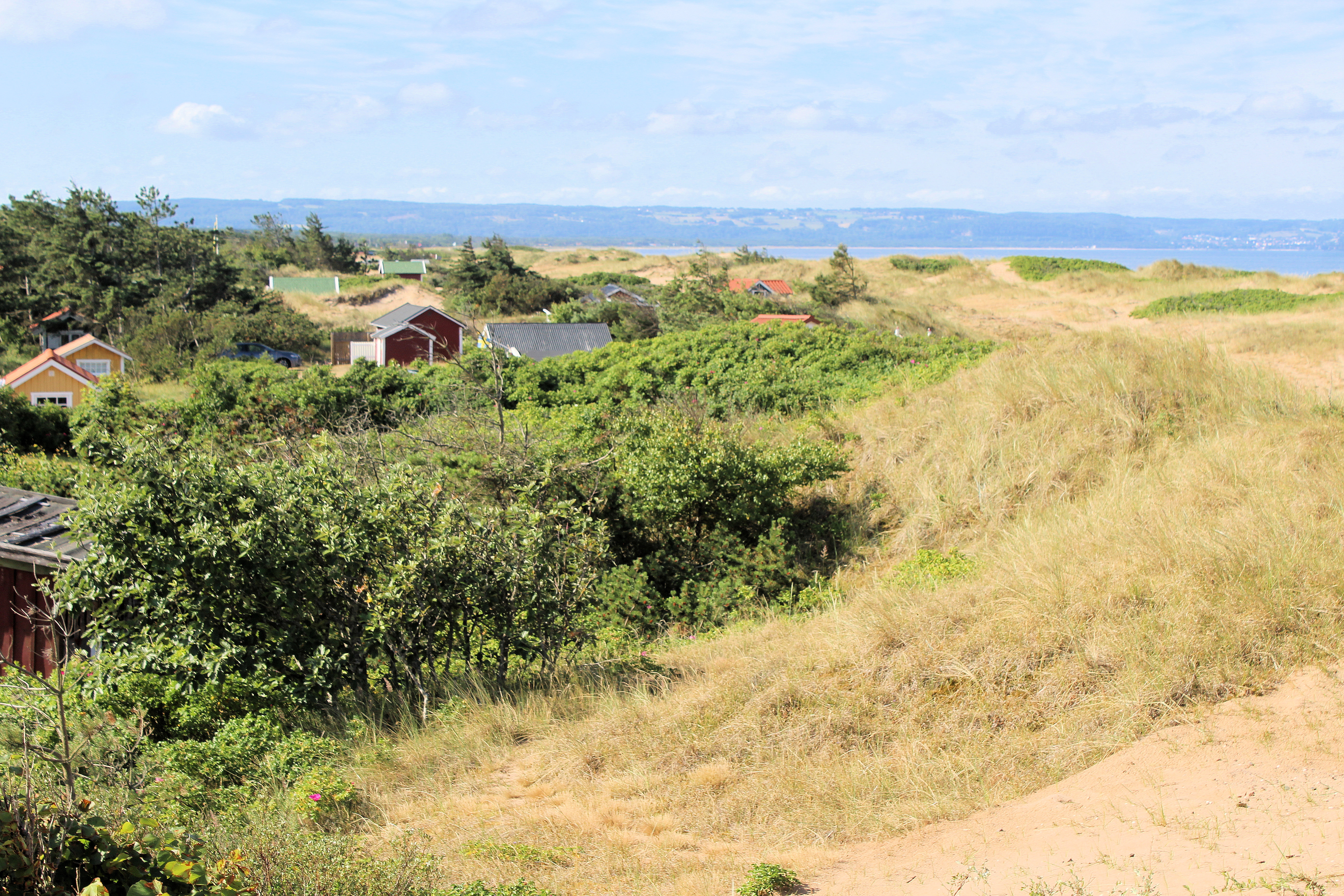
- Mellbystrand environment

- Location within Halland Location within Sweden
- Coordinates: 56°31′N 12°56′E
- Country: Sweden
- Province: Halland
- County: Halland County
- Municipality: Laholm Municipality

Area
  - Total: 2.71 km^{2} (1.05 sq mi)

Population (31 December 2010)
  - Total: 1,619
  - Density: 598/km^{2} (1,550/sq mi)
- Time zone: UTC+1 (CET)
  - Summer (DST): UTC+2 (CEST)

Mellbystrand is a locality situated in Laholm Municipality, Halland County, Sweden, with 1,619 inhabitants in 2010.

Geographically the village is located south of the estuary of the river Lagan, stretching along the Bay of Laholm. The village is primarily known for the 12 km long sandy beach also named Mellbystrand. Each summer the village receives many tourists.
