= Frillesås BK =

Bandy club in Sweden

- City: Frillesås, Sweden
- League: Elitserien
- Founded: 1960; 65 years ago
- Home arena: Sjöaremossen
- Website: frillesasbandy.se
Home colours	Away colours

Frillesås BK, FBK, is a bandy club in Sweden. It is based in Frillesås in Kungsbacka Municipality but plays its homegames on Sjöaremossen bandy field in Varberg Municipality. The club was founded in 1960. The club colours are green, yellow and black.

The club has played in Allsvenskan for many years but has been relegated to Division 1 for the 2010–11 season, from which they managed to get promoted again already for the upcoming season, were then relegated again for the 2014–15 season.

On 24 February 2018 the club qualified for the 2018–2019 season Elitserien, becoming the first Halland team ever in the Swedish men's bandy top division.
