= Gundal, Ranga Reddy =

Gundal
- Village
- Location in Telangana, India
- Country: India
- State: Telangana

Government
  - Body: Mandal Office

Area
  - Total: 7.28 km^{2} (2.81 sq mi)

Population (2011)
  - Total: 2,136
  - Density: 293/km^{2} (760/sq mi)

Languages
  - Official: Telugu
- Time zone: UTC+5:30 (IST)
- Planning agency: Panchayat
- Civic agency: Mandal Office

Gundal is a village and panchayat in Telangana, India. It falls under Chevella mandal of Ranga Reddy district.

According to the 2011 census of India, it has a population of 2136.
