= Tone Heimdal Brataas =

Norwegian politician

Tone Heimdal Brataas (born 24 July 1970) is a Norwegian politician for the Progress Party.

In the 2013 election she was elected as a deputy representative to the Parliament of Norway from Buskerud, being re-elected as such in 2017. She has served as an elected member of Røyken municipal council.

She has her education in marketing and economics from BI Norwegian Business School. She is also a board member of Vardar since 2012.
