= Kungsbacka Municipality =

Kungsbacka Municipality Kungsbacka kommun
- Municipality
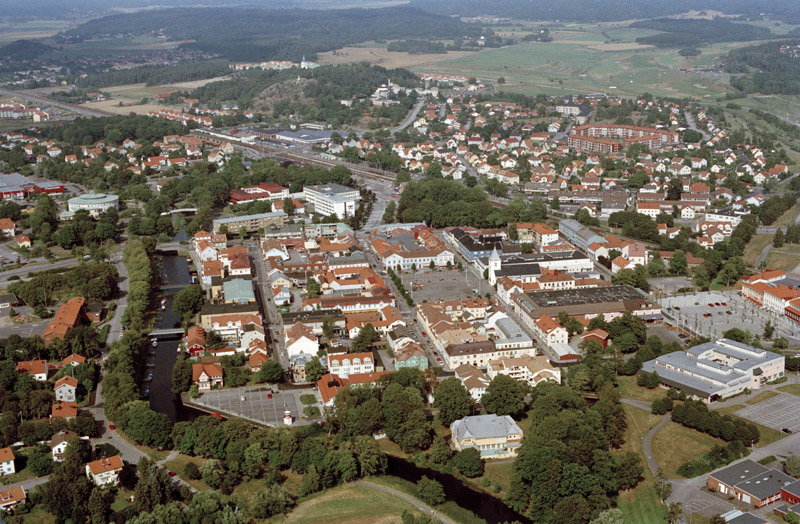

- Coat of arms

- Coordinates: 57°29′N 12°04′E
- Country: Sweden
- County: Halland County
- Seat: Kungsbacka

Area
  - Total: 1,472.94 km^{2} (568.71 sq mi)
  - Land: 606.67 km^{2} (234.24 sq mi)
  - Water: 866.27 km^{2} (334.47 sq mi)
- Area as of 1 January 2014.

Population (30 June 2025)
  - Total: 86,194
  - Density: 142.08/km^{2} (367.98/sq mi)
- Time zone: UTC+1 (CET)
  - Summer (DST): UTC+2 (CEST)
- ISO 3166 code: SE
- Province: Halland
- Municipal code: 1384
- Website: www.kungsbacka.se
- Density is calculated using land area only.

Kungsbacka Municipality (Swedish: Kungsbacka kommun) is a municipality in Halland County on the Swedish west coast, some 30 km south of Gothenburg. The municipal seat is located in the town Kungsbacka.

In 1969 Tölö was merged into the City of Kungsbacka. In 1971 the municipality was created when the city amalgamated with Särö. The final step was taken in 1974 when three more former municipalities were added to form the new entity.

Kungsbacka Municipality is closely integrated in the region of Metropolitan Gothenburg, but despite this it is administratively not a part of Västra Götaland County like the rest of the region.

A local geographical landmark is the glacial ridge Fjärås bräcka, to the south of Kungsbacka, but it is the coast that is the predominant geographical feature. The municipality receives its drinking water from the nearby lake Lygnern; the water undergoes a natural filtering process as it trickles through the ridge, contributing to its quality.

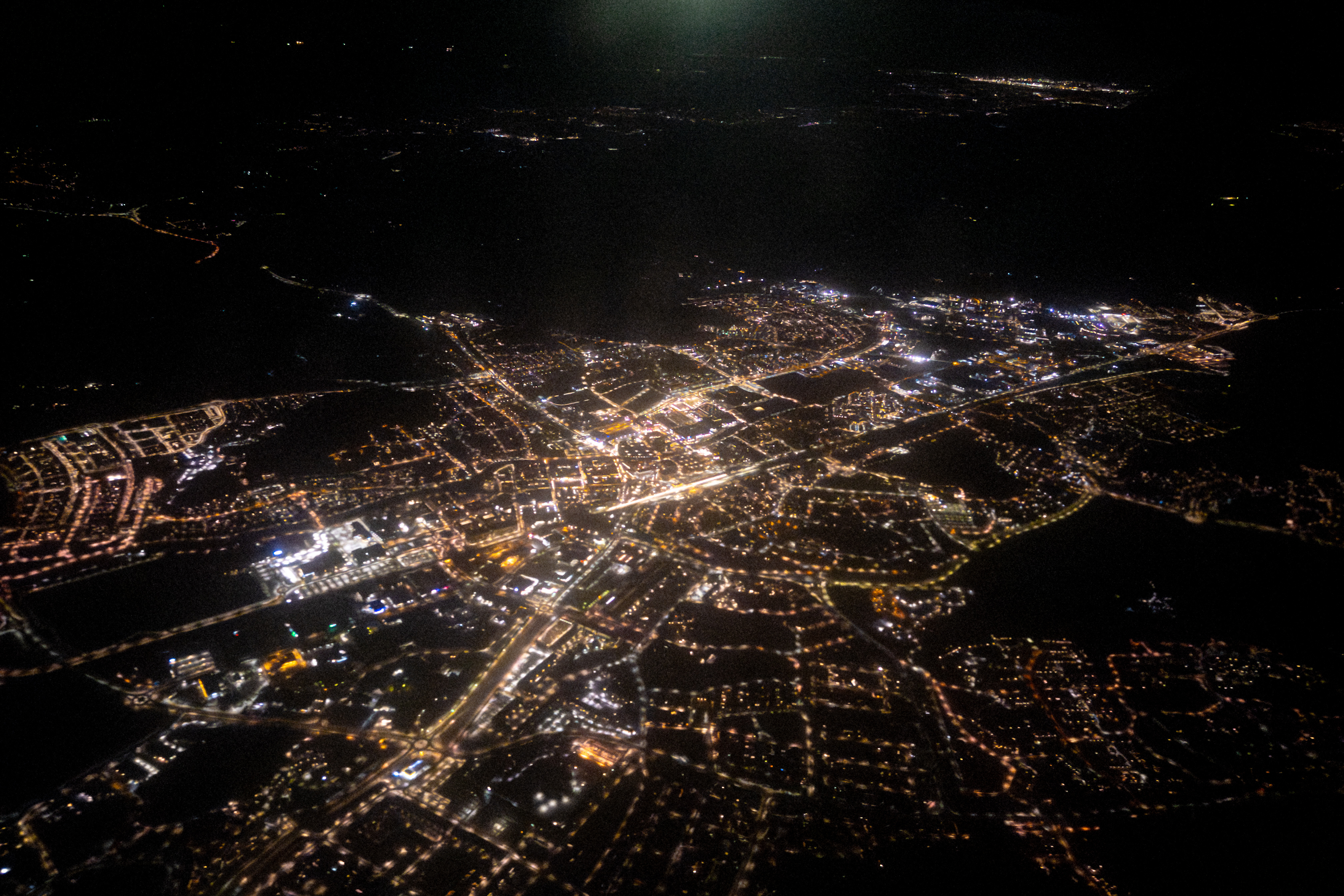
Aerial view of Kungsbacka and its surroundings.

== Localities ==
There are 22 urban areas (also called a tätort or locality) in Kungsbacka Municipality.

In the table the localities are listed according to the size of the population as of 31 December 2005. The municipal seat is in bold characters.

#	Locality	Population
1	**Kungsbacka**	17,784
2	Onsala	11,375
3	Billdal 1)	9,609
4	Åsa	3,218
5	Särö	2,982
6	Fjärås kyrkby	2,213
7	Frillesås 2)	1,924
8	Backa	1,516
9	Vallda	1,439
10	Anneberg	1,398
11	Västra Hagen	810
12	Ölmanäs	787
13	Buerås	556
14	Halla Heberg	509
15	Lerkil	411
16	Gundal och Högås	363
17	Hagryd-Dala	355
18	Hjälmared	341
19	Brattås	339
20	Kläppa	298
21	Hjälm	251
22	Röda Holme	201

1) Billdal is a bimunicipal locality. About 3,000 of the inhabitants are in Gothenburg Municipality.

2) A minor part of Frillesås is in Varberg Municipality.

== Demographics ==
This is a demographic table based on Kungsbacka Municipality's electoral districts in the 2022 Swedish general election sourced from SVT's election platform, in turn taken from SCB official statistics.

In total there were 83,376 residents, including 64,298 Swedish citizens of voting age. 34.6% voted for the left coalition and 64.4% for the right coalition. The right coalition won all 46 electoral districts in the municipality, making Kungsbacka the largest municipality in Sweden where this occurred. Indicators are in percentage points except population totals and income.

Location	Residents	Citizen adults	Left vote	Right vote	Employed	Swedish parents	Foreign heritage	Income SEK	Degree
Location			%	%					
Anneberg	1,854	1,369	39.8	59.0	89	91	9	31,316	54
Björkris	2,051	1,277	36.7	61.3	79	75	25	27,708	46
Bukärr C	2,348	1,787	25.6	73.1	85	90	10	35,463	65
Fjärås N	2,315	1,694	39.0	59.7	86	87	13	28,524	38
Fjärås S	1,748	1,233	33.3	65.4	88	88	12	29,054	37
Fjärås/Må	2,292	1,603	39.8	59.2	86	86	14	27,044	40
Fors	1,587	1,179	42.5	56.4	88	93	7	33,146	61
Forsbäck/Oskarsberg	2,558	1,887	29.3	70.5	89	90	10	36,565	60
Frillesås Kust	1,971	1,447	40.9	58.0	85	91	9	29,727	50
Frillesås Landsbygd	2,055	1,488	39.2	58.8	87	90	10	29,008	36
Gottskär	1,555	1,232	24.3	74.7	86	91	9	34,377	59
Gällinge/Idala	1,931	1,474	37.3	61.5	87	91	9	27,617	33
Hammerö	1,414	1,104	38.2	60.0	81	80	20	25,739	44
Hammerö S/V	1,624	1,251	35.3	63.5	83	85	15	27,796	48
Hanhals	1,351	1,014	36.1	63.2	88	91	9	29,896	42
Hede	1,624	1,187	43.0	56.5	87	90	10	30,598	54
Hålabäck	1,925	1,496	41.4	57.1	84	83	17	26,594	41
Innerstaden	1,258	1,149	32.3	66.3	83	86	14	27,877	36
Kolla N	1,444	1,175	36.1	63.4	90	88	12	30,641	56
Kolla S	1,189	909	32.1	67.0	91	89	11	31,697	50
Kullavik C	1,840	1,439	30.2	69.4	86	89	11	34,309	61
Kyvik	2,104	1,590	23.3	76.3	83	91	9	39,605	72
Malevik/Släps Inland	2,153	1,578	28.6	70.7	87	89	11	35,609	60
Onsala Kyrka	2,010	1,553	31.5	67.1	85	89	11	32,536	56
Onsala Rydet	1,912	1,430	29.8	69.1	90	90	10	33,736	55
Presse/Skällared	2,169	1,563	31.8	67.5	92	91	9	34,060	56
Släps Kullen	2,307	1,765	22.0	77.5	85	91	9	44,611	73
Särö	1,905	1,461	23.8	75.2	84	88	12	34,947	59
Södra Onsala	1,376	1,064	29.0	69.9	84	90	10	34,683	60
Tingberget	1,324	1,149	39.1	59.8	84	83	17	25,350	41
Tölö	1,935	1,292	38.6	60.4	90	88	12	33,493	56
Vallda Backa	2,003	1,471	38.0	61.6	89	93	7	31,167	51
Vallda Bröndome	1,529	1,126	31.2	66.8	88	89	11	30,223	44
Vallda Lerkil	1,886	1,442	31.2	68.3	87	91	9	32,375	50
Vallda Sandö	1,892	1,401	34.2	64.9	89	92	8	35,096	62
Varla N	2,181	1,711	38.1	61.5	85	86	14	28,780	49
Varla S	2,039	1,625	44.4	53.9	80	80	20	23,296	31
Vässingö/Röda Holme	1,613	1,282	33.5	65.7	89	91	9	31,956	58
Västra Onsala	2,439	1,806	33.5	65.4	89	92	8	31,570	45
Västra Villastaden	1,584	1,263	39.1	60.5	83	85	15	27,602	44
Åsa C	2,013	1,521	40.6	58.1	85	89	11	27,610	44
Åsa Kust	1,499	1,223	34.4	64.4	82	89	11	32,071	54
Älvsåker	1,862	1,387	39.0	59.4	89	90	10	31,023	41
Ö Villastaden	1,857	1,535	39.5	59.1	84	91	9	28,011	50
Ölmanäs	1,850	1,418	34.2	64.6	89	93	7	33,388	61
Ölmevalla Ö	1,828	1,248	39.8	59.6	86	87	13	31,244	46
Source: SVT
