= Mikael Sandklef =

Swedish footballer

Mikael Henrik Sandklef (born 3 July 1973) is a Swedish retired association football player in the midfielder position.

After playing for local club Åsa IF, he joined Västra Frölunda IF in 1997. He joined IFK Göteborg in 2000, and played six seasons for the club. In 2006, he moved to GAIS, retiring after one season there due to injuries.

== Clubs ==
- Frillesås FF, Åsa IF
- Västra Frölunda IF (1997–1999)
- IFK Göteborg (2000–2005)
- GAIS (2006)
