= Halland County =

County (län) of Sweden

Halland County Hallands län (Swedish)
- Swedish county
- Flag Coat of arms

- Halland County in Sweden

- Location map of Halland County in Sweden
- Coordinates: 56°43′00″N 12°49′16″E
- Country: Sweden
- Founded: 1719
- Capital: Halmstad
- Municipalities: 6: Falkenberg; Halmstad; Hylte; Kungsbacka; Laholm; Varberg

Government
  - Governor: Anders Thornberg
  - Council: Region Halland

Area
  - Total: 5,454 km^{2} (2,106 sq mi)

Population (31 December 2023)
  - Total: 343,746
  - Density: 63.03/km^{2} (163.2/sq mi)

GDP
  - Total: SEK 102 billion €10.920 billion (2015)
- Time zone: UTC+1 (CET)
  - Summer (DST): UTC+2 (CEST)
- ISO 3166 code: SE-N
- NUTS Region: SE231
- Website: www.lansstyrelsen.se/halland

Halland County (Swedish: Hallands län, pronounced [ˈhǎlːan(d)s ˈlɛːn]) is a county (län) on the western coast of Sweden. It corresponds roughly to the cultural and historical province of Halland. The capital is Halmstad. Prince Julian, the son of Prince Carl Philip, is Duke of Halland.

It borders the counties of Västra Götaland, Jönköping, Kronoberg, Scania and the sea of the Kattegat.

== Heraldry ==
The County of Halland inherited its coat of arms from the province of Halland. When it is shown with a royal crown it represents the County Administrative Board.

== Province ==
Counties mainly serve administrative purposes in Sweden. The culture and history of the area is to be found in its provincial counterpart Halland. The county was designed with virtually the same boundaries as the province. The major exception is a part of Hylte Municipality, which belongs to the province of Småland.

== Geography ==
- Genevadsån river

== Administration ==
The main aim of the County Administrative Board is to fulfil the goals set in national politics by the Riksdag and the Government, to coordinate the interests and promote the development of the county, to establish regional goals and safeguard the due process of law in the handling of each case. The County Administrative Board is a Government Agency headed by a governor. See List of Halland Governors.

== Politics ==
Region Halland is the local government for Halland County, and is controlled by the regional council and regional board of Halland. The regional council is elected directly by the residents in regional elections held every four years at the same time as municipal and Riksdag elections.

Among the main responsibilities of the Halland Regional Council (Region Halland) are health care and public transit. The right-leaning political parties have held a majority in every election from 1912 until 2014, regaining it in 2018 and losing it again in 2022. However, even when only able to form a minority, the right-wing have controlled the regional board.

== Riksdag elections ==
The table details all Riksdag election results of Halland County since the unicameral era began in 1970. The blocs denote which party would support the Prime Minister or the lead opposition party towards the end of the elected parliament.

Year	Turnout	Votes	V	S	MP	C	L	KD	M	SD	NyD	Left	Right
1970	89.9	119,972	2.4	37.7		33.5	13.1	1.8	11.8			40.0	58.4
1973	91.9	134,086	2.6	36.6		37.4	7.6	0.9	14.5			39.3	59.5
1976	92.8	146,371	2.4	35.4		35.1	10.3	0.7	15.9			37.7	61.4
1979	91.8	150,322	3.0	35.8		27.6	10.3	0.8	22.2			38.8	60.1
1982	92.5	155,884	3.2	37.8	1.7	23.9	5.9	1.3	26.1			41.0	55.8
1985	90.9	159,494	2.9	38.4	1.7	18.5	15.6		22.7			41.3	56.8
1988	87.3	157,729	3.4	38.0	5.7	17.9	13.1	2.1	19.5			47.1	50.5
1991	88.2	164,719	2.6	32.1	3.2	13.7	9.1	7.0	24.3		7.4	34.7	54.1
1994	88.0	170,741	4.2	40.4	4.7	12.6	6.7	3.7	25.4		1.5	49.3	48.4
1998	82.8	164,049	8.6	31.8	3.9	8.4	4.3	12.8	24.7			44.3	50.2
2002	81.5	168,247	5.9	35.8	3.9	9.5	13.9	9.9	17.4	1.0		45.7	50.7
2006	83.5	179,470	4.0	31.6	4.0	10.4	7.7	6.7	29.7	2.9		39.6	54.4
2010	86.2	195,565	3.5	26.8	5.9	8.8	7.8	5.6	34.7	5.4		36.2	56.9
2014	87.5	206,559	3.8	28.4	5.9	8.4	5.7	4.4	27.7	12.9		38.0	46.2
2018	89.0	216,982	4.8	25.8	3.5	10.1	5.7	7.1	22.9	18.6		44.3	54.3
2022	86.6	224,183	4.0	28.3	3.6	7.0	4.8	6.0	22.5	22.6		42.9	55.9

== Municipalities ==
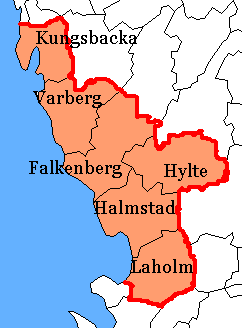

Sweden's counties are entities for Sweden's municipalities, responsible for such things as child care, education, street planning, etc. Municipalities in Halland County are, from north to south, with the numbers of inhabitants:

In Halland Province: (2021)

- Falkenberg: 46,773
- Halmstad: 104,573
- Hylte: 10,619
- Kungsbacka: 85,301
- Laholm: 26,319
- Varberg: 66,658

== Culture ==
=== Music groups ===
- Gyllene Tider
- Roxette
- Isildurs Bane
- Sonic Syndicate
- Sabel

== Localities in order of size ==
The five most populous localities of Halland County in 2020:

#	Locality	Population
1	Halmstad	71,422
2	Varberg	36,327
3	Falkenberg	28,747
4	Kungsbacka	24,071
5	Onsala	12,415

== Demographics ==
=== Foreign background ===
SCB have collected statistics on backgrounds of residents since 2002. These tables consist of all who have two foreign-born parents or are born abroad themselves. The chart lists election years and the last year on record alone.

Location	2002	2006	2010	2014	2018	2019
Falkenberg	10.8	12.1	13.6	15.5	18.6	19.2
Halmstad	15.7	17.0	18.8	20.1	24.5	25.2
Hylte	14.0	16.5	19.5	24.3	31.8	32.1
Kungsbacka	7.0	7.3	7.8	8.6	10.7	11.1
Laholm	8.5	9.7	11.6	13.5	18.0	18.7
Varberg	9.0	9.6	10.7	11.8	13.7	14.2
Total	11.0	11.9	13.2	14.8	17.8	18.4
Source: SCB
