= Forests of Sweden =

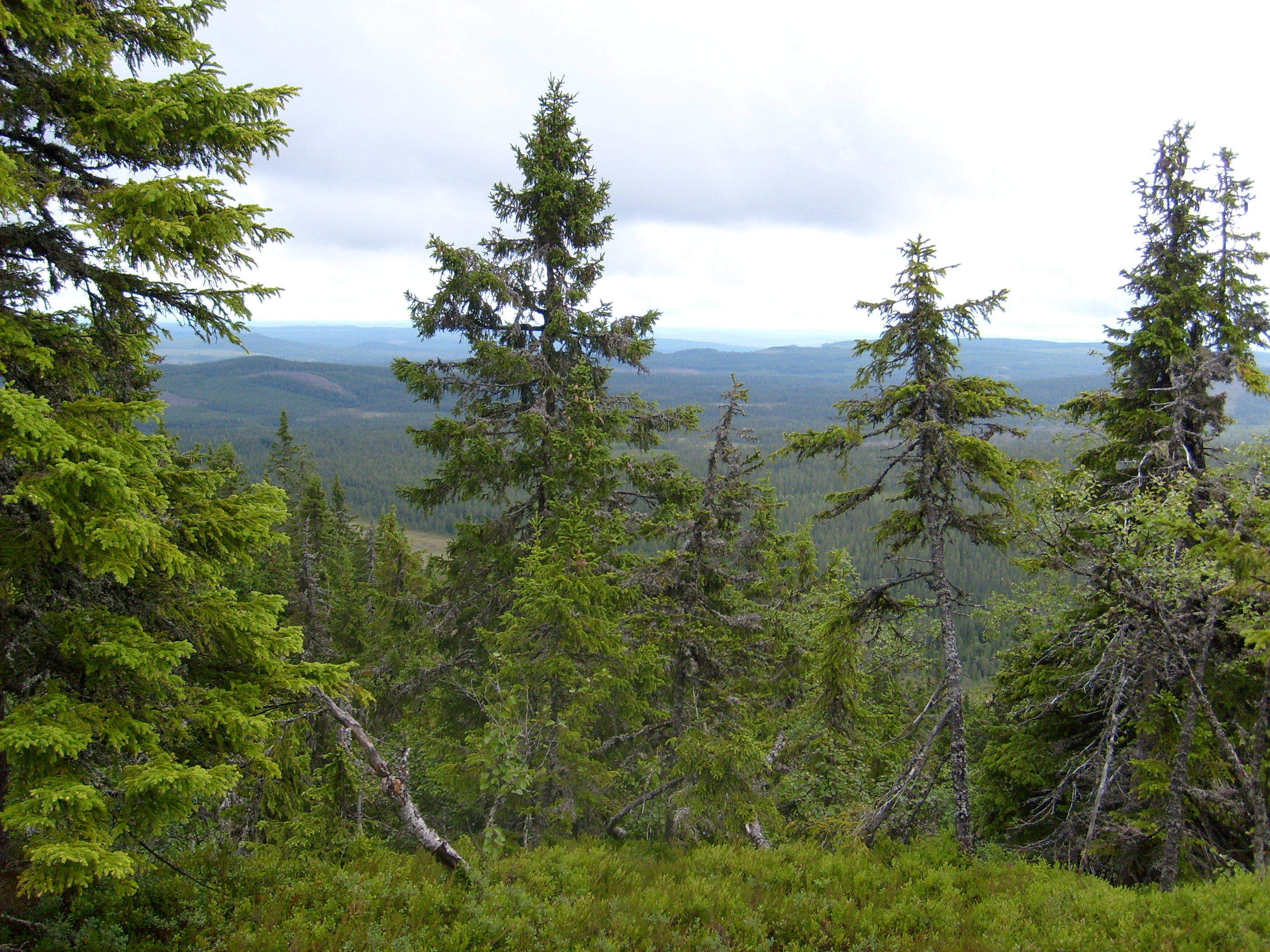
A forest in Dalarna

Sweden is covered by 68% forest. In southern Sweden, human interventions started to have a significant impact on broadleaved forests around 2000 years ago, where the first evidence of extensive agriculture has been found. Recent studies describe a long-term process of borealization in south-central Sweden starting at the beginning of the Holocene where oak (Quercus spp.) and alder (Alnus spp.) seemingly started to decline around 2000 years ago due to a decrease in temperature. At the same time the Norway spruce (Picea abies) started to emigrate from the north, and the European beech (Fagus sylvatica) emigrated from the south of Europe. Though, as a primary result of production forest management at the middle of the twentieth century, Norway spruce (Picea abies) and Scots pine (Pinus sylvestris) cover together around 78% of Sweden's actual standing tree volume.

== Economic use of forests ==
Wood from the forest has long been used in the southern part of the country and in early agricultural areas as a source of fuel and as a building material. Wood was essential for Sweden's early mining industry, as it was used to produce charcoal for processing ore. Other important forestry products included wood pitch, tar, and potash, which were produced for export beginning in the Middle Ages.

Forestry work expanded to Norrland beginning in the early 19th century, and the resulting cleared areas became the site of small farms and pastures. Extensive logging resulted in the development of a sawmill industry, which produced lumber for export. This expansion continued until 1905. The Statistical Yearbook of Forestry chronicles the state of the forestry industry since the 1940s and is the responsibility of the Swedish Forest Agency.

== List of Swedish forests ==
- Kolmården
- Tiveden
- Tylöskog
- Kilsbergen
