= Results of the 1960 Swedish general election =

Swedish general election results in 1960

Sweden held a general election on the 18 September 1960. 232 seats were filled in the election.

== Results ==
| Party | Votes | % | Seats | +/– |
|---|---|---|---|---|
| Swedish Social Democratic Party | 2,033,016 | 47.79 | 114 | +3 |
| People's Party | 744,142 | 17.49 | 40 | +2 |
| Rightist Party | 704,365 | 16.56 | 39 | –6 |
| Centre Party | 579,007 | 13.61 | 34 | +2 |
| Communist Party | 190,560 | 4.48 | 5 | 0 |
| Progress Union | 1,375 | 0.03 | 0 | New |
| Corporate Party | 614 | 0.01 | 0 | New |
| Left Socialist Party | 176 | 0.00 | 0 | 0 |
| Other parties | 859 | 0.02 | 0 | 0 |
| Total | 4,254,114 | 100.00 | 232 | +1 |
| Valid votes | 4,254,114 | 99.59 | | |
| Invalid/blank votes | 17,496 | 0.41 | | |
| Total votes | 4,271,610 | 100.00 | | |
| Registered voters/turnout | 4,972,177 | 85.91 | | |
Source: Nohlen & Stöver

== Regional results ==
=== Percentage share ===
| Location | Share | Votes | S | FP | H | C | K | Other | Left | Right |
|---|---|---|---|---|---|---|---|---|---|---|
| Götaland | 48.1 | 2,047,323 | 45.1 | 17.1 | 18.4 | 16.4 | 3.0 | 0.0 | 48.1 | 51.8 |
| Svealand | 36.2 | 1,539,587 | 49.1 | 19.3 | 16.8 | 9.6 | 5.0 | 0.1 | 54.2 | 45.7 |
| Norrland | 15.7 | 667,204 | 52.9 | 14.6 | 10.4 | 14.4 | 7.7 | 0.0 | 60.6 | 39.4 |
| Total | 100.0 | 4,254,114 | 47.8 | 17.5 | 16.6 | 13.6 | 4.5 | 0.0 | 52.3 | 47.7 |
Source: SCB

=== By votes ===
| Location | Share | Votes | S | FP | H | C | K | Other | Left | Right |
|---|---|---|---|---|---|---|---|---|---|---|
| Götaland | 48.1 | 2,047,323 | 923,772 | 349,731 | 375,886 | 335,205 | 61,773 | 956 | 985,545 | 1,060,822 |
| Svealand | 36.2 | 1,539,587 | 756,224 | 297,301 | 258,884 | 147,662 | 77,637 | 1,879 | 833,861 | 703,847 |
| Norrland | 15.7 | 667,204 | 353,020 | 97,110 | 69,595 | 96,140 | 51,150 | 189 | 404,170 | 262,845 |
| Total | 100.0 | 4,254,114 | 2,033,016 | 744,142 | 704,365 | 579,007 | 190,560 | 3,024 | 2,223,576 | 2,027,514 |
Source: SCB

== Constituency results ==
=== Percentage share ===
| Location | Land | Turnout | Share | Votes | S | FP | H | C | K | Other | Left | Right | Margin |
| Location | | % | % | | % | % | % | % | % | % | % | % | |
|---|---|---|---|---|---|---|---|---|---|---|---|---|---|
| Blekinge | G | 82.3 | 1.9 | 81,106 | 50.6 | 18.1 | 14.9 | 13.3 | 3.1 | 0.0 | 53.8 | 46.2 | 6,111 |
| Bohuslän | G | 80.4 | 2.8 | 120,274 | 42.7 | 25.7 | 15.2 | 13.1 | 3.3 | 0.0 | 46.0 | 54.0 | 9,627 |
| Gothenburg | G | 82.3 | 5.5 | 232,100 | 42.2 | 31.3 | 15.1 | 1.8 | 9.3 | 0.3 | 51.5 | 48.2 | 7,685 |
| Gotland | G | 85.7 | 0.7 | 30,710 | 36.5 | 12.1 | 16.5 | 34.2 | 0.7 | 0.0 | 37.2 | 62.8 | 7,880 |
| Gävleborg | N | 81.6 | 3.9 | 165,048 | 53.4 | 14.5 | 8.4 | 14.4 | 7.6 | 0.0 | 62.6 | 37.4 | 41,626 |
| Halland | G | 84.7 | 2.3 | 98,293 | 34.9 | 13.1 | 19.1 | 31.4 | 1.5 | 0.0 | 41.6 | 58.4 | 16,486 |
| Jämtland | N | 82.2 | 1.8 | 77,304 | 52.4 | 13.6 | 13.5 | 17.9 | 2.6 | 0.0 | 55.1 | 44.9 | 7,828 |
| Jönköping | G | 86.5 | 3.9 | 166,211 | 42.3 | 19.5 | 16.4 | 19.8 | 2.0 | 0.0 | 44.3 | 55.7 | 18,950 |
| Kalmar | G | 84.0 | 3.2 | 135,902 | 46.5 | 9.6 | 19.4 | 22.1 | 2.4 | 0.0 | 48.9 | 51.1 | 3,039 |
| Kopparberg | S | 79.5 | 3.6 | 154,580 | 52.7 | 15.2 | 10.0 | 17.2 | 4.9 | 0.0 | 57.6 | 42.4 | 23,366 |
| Kristianstad | G | 84.5 | 3.5 | 148,227 | 41.7 | 16.6 | 19.8 | 20.8 | 1.1 | 0.0 | 42.9 | 57.1 | 21,167 |
| Kronoberg | G | 83.3 | 2.2 | 91,569 | 40.6 | 10.1 | 25.7 | 20.2 | 3.4 | 0.0 | 44.0 | 56.0 | 10,906 |
| Malmö area | G | 86.5 | 5.3 | 223,369 | 53.7 | 11.4 | 29.2 | 5.8 | 1.9 | 0.0 | 55.6 | 44.4 | 25,073 |
| Malmöhus | G | 86.6 | 3.5 | 150,517 | 47.4 | 11.1 | 16.7 | 24.4 | 0.4 | 0.0 | 47.8 | 52.2 | 6,579 |
| Norrbotten | N | 81.2 | 3.1 | 129,848 | 54.5 | 8.9 | 12.1 | 9.0 | 15.5 | 0.0 | 70.0 | 30.0 | 51,843 |
| Skaraborg | G | 84.2 | 3.4 | 143,746 | 37.7 | 19.4 | 16.7 | 24.2 | 2.0 | 0.0 | 39.7 | 60.3 | 29,581 |
| Stockholm | S | 85.0 | 11.1 | 473,970 | 42.9 | 24.1 | 23.3 | 2.8 | 6.6 | 0.3 | 49.6 | 50.1 | 2,512 |
| Stockholm County | S | 82.4 | 5.7 | 242,378 | 45.6 | 19.8 | 21.2 | 8.4 | 4.9 | 0.1 | 50.5 | 49.4 | 2,795 |
| Södermanland | S | 85.1 | 3.1 | 130,418 | 55.1 | 17.7 | 12.5 | 12.5 | 2.2 | 0.0 | 57.3 | 42.7 | 19,132 |
| Uppsala | S | 84.6 | 2.2 | 95,544 | 48.9 | 18.1 | 15.0 | 15.6 | 2.4 | 0.0 | 51.3 | 48.7 | 2,531 |
| Värmland | S | 82.8 | 3.9 | 168,002 | 53.5 | 13.9 | 14.0 | 12.7 | 5.9 | 0.0 | 59.4 | 40.6 | 31,723 |
| Västerbotten | N | 84.1 | 3.0 | 129,422 | 48.9 | 21.9 | 11.8 | 15.4 | 2.0 | 0.0 | 50.9 | 49.1 | 2,366 |
| Västernorrland | N | 85.6 | 3.9 | 165,582 | 53.6 | 14.6 | 10.9 | 14.8 | 6.1 | 0.0 | 61.4 | 38.6 | 37,662 |
| Västmanland | S | 80.5 | 2.9 | 123,196 | 56.7 | 15.8 | 10.3 | 12.9 | 4.2 | 0.1 | 60.9 | 39.0 | 27,064 |
| Älvsborg N | G | 83.0 | 2.7 | 114,122 | 45.0 | 21.5 | 12.8 | 18.3 | 2.4 | 0.0 | 47.3 | 52.7 | 6,165 |
| Älvsborg S | G | 85.5 | 2.4 | 102,367 | 42.8 | 13.3 | 23.9 | 17.0 | 3.0 | 0.0 | 45.8 | 54.2 | 8,578 |
| Örebro | S | 83.7 | 3.6 | 151,499 | 54.4 | 18.8 | 9.9 | 12.7 | 4.2 | 0.0 | 58.5 | 41.4 | 25,915 |
| Östergötland | G | 87.2 | 4.9 | 208,810 | 52.7 | 13.4 | 16.6 | 14.1 | 3.2 | 0.0 | 55.9 | 44.1 | 24,812 |
| Total | | 85.9 | 100.0 | 4,254,114 | 47.8 | 17.5 | 16.6 | 13.6 | 4.5 | 0.0 | 52.3 | 47.7 | 196,062 |
Source: SCB

=== By votes ===
| Location | Land | Turnout | Share | Votes | S | FP | H | C | K | Other | Left | Right | Margin |
| Location | | % | % | | | | | | | | | | |
|---|---|---|---|---|---|---|---|---|---|---|---|---|---|
| Blekinge | G | 82.3 | 1.9 | 81,106 | 41,086 | 14,647 | 12,083 | 10,766 | 2,521 | 3 | 43,607 | 37,496 | 6,111 |
| Bohuslän | G | 80.4 | 2.8 | 120,274 | 51,338 | 30,853 | 18,311 | 15,784 | 3,983 | 5 | 55,321 | 64,948 | 9,627 |
| Gothenburg | G | 82.3 | 5.5 | 232,100 | 97,887 | 72,611 | 34,948 | 4,247 | 21,604 | 803 | 119,491 | 111,806 | 7,685 |
| Gotland | G | 85.7 | 0.7 | 30,710 | 11,217 | 3,724 | 5,075 | 10,495 | 197 | 2 | 11,414 | 19,294 | 7,880 |
| Gävleborg | N | 81.6 | 3.9 | 165,048 | 88,255 | 23,920 | 13,866 | 23,868 | 15,025 | 114 | 103,280 | 61,654 | 41,626 |
| Halland | G | 84.7 | 2.3 | 98,293 | 39,013 | 12,514 | 15,864 | 29,009 | 1,888 | 5 | 40,901 | 57,387 | 16,486 |
| Jämtland | N | 82.2 | 1.8 | 77,304 | 40,544 | 10,485 | 10,401 | 13,846 | 2,016 | 12 | 42,560 | 34,732 | 7,828 |
| Jönköping | G | 86.5 | 3.9 | 166,211 | 70,274 | 32,430 | 27,276 | 32,860 | 3,342 | 29 | 73,616 | 92,566 | 18,950 |
| Kalmar | G | 84.0 | 3.2 | 135,902 | 63,142 | 13,070 | 26,401 | 29,995 | 3,285 | 9 | 66,427 | 69,466 | 3,039 |
| Kopparberg | S | 79.5 | 3.6 | 154,580 | 81,403 | 23,564 | 15,411 | 26,623 | 7,561 | 18 | 88,964 | 65,598 | 23,366 |
| Kristianstad | G | 84.5 | 3.5 | 148,227 | 61,852 | 24,582 | 29,268 | 30,845 | 1,676 | 4 | 63,528 | 84,695 | 21,167 |
| Kronoberg | G | 83.3 | 2.2 | 91,569 | 37,205 | 9,236 | 18,499 | 23,500 | 3,124 | 5 | 40,329 | 51,235 | 10,906 |
| Malmö area | G | 86.5 | 5.3 | 223,369 | 120,062 | 25,471 | 65,161 | 8,500 | 4,143 | 32 | 124,205 | 99,132 | 25,073 |
| Malmöhus | G | 86.6 | 3.5 | 150,517 | 71,296 | 16,681 | 25,176 | 36,683 | 665 | 16 | 71,961 | 78,540 | 6,579 |
| Norrbotten | N | 81.2 | 3.1 | 129,848 | 70,704 | 11,565 | 15,731 | 11,690 | 20,125 | 33 | 90,829 | 38,986 | 51,843 |
| Skaraborg | G | 84.2 | 3.4 | 143,746 | 54,176 | 27,860 | 24,078 | 34,723 | 2,904 | 5 | 57,080 | 86,661 | 29,581 |
| Stockholm | S | 85.0 | 11.1 | 473,970 | 203,542 | 114,020 | 110,432 | 13,051 | 31,449 | 1,476 | 234,991 | 237,503 | 2,512 |
| Stockholm County | S | 82.4 | 5.7 | 242,378 | 110,604 | 48,050 | 51,373 | 20,273 | 11,887 | 191 | 122,491 | 119,696 | 2,795 |
| Södermanland | S | 85.1 | 3.1 | 130,418 | 71,903 | 23,091 | 16,245 | 16,298 | 2,863 | 18 | 74,766 | 55,634 | 19,132 |
| Uppsala | S | 84.6 | 2.2 | 95,544 | 46,737 | 17,312 | 14,293 | 14,894 | 2,293 | 15 | 49,030 | 46,499 | 2,531 |
| Värmland | S | 82.8 | 3.9 | 168,002 | 89,844 | 23,294 | 23,485 | 21,358 | 10,016 | 5 | 99,860 | 68,137 | 31,723 |
| Västerbotten | N | 84.1 | 3.0 | 129,422 | 63,244 | 28,331 | 15,276 | 19,914 | 2,643 | 14 | 65,887 | 63,521 | 2,366 |
| Västernorrland | N | 85.6 | 3.9 | 165,582 | 90,273 | 22,809 | 14,321 | 26,822 | 11,341 | 16 | 101,614 | 63,952 | 37,662 |
| Västmanland | S | 80.5 | 2.9 | 123,196 | 69,823 | 19,449 | 12,637 | 15,910 | 5,237 | 140 | 75,060 | 47,996 | 27,064 |
| Älvsborg N | G | 83.0 | 2.7 | 114,122 | 51,291 | 24,577 | 14,634 | 20,931 | 2,686 | 3 | 53,977 | 60,142 | 6,165 |
| Älvsborg S | G | 85.5 | 2.4 | 102,367 | 43,834 | 13,622 | 24,464 | 17,381 | 3,055 | 11 | 46,889 | 55,467 | 8,578 |
| Örebro | S | 83.7 | 3.6 | 151,499 | 82,368 | 28,521 | 15,008 | 19,255 | 6,331 | 16 | 88,699 | 62,784 | 25,915 |
| Östergötland | G | 87.2 | 4.9 | 208,810 | 110,099 | 27,853 | 34,648 | 29,486 | 6,700 | 24 | 116,799 | 91,987 | 24,812 |
| Total | | 85.9 | 100.0 | 4,254,114 | 2,033,016 | 744,142 | 704,365 | 579,007 | 190,560 | 3,024 | 2,223,576 | 2,027,514 | 196,062 |
Source: SCB
