= Results of the 1985 Swedish general election =

Sweden held a general election on the 15 September 1985.

== Results ==
Party	Votes	%	Seats			
Party	Votes	%	Con.	Lev.	Tot.	+/–
Swedish Social Democratic Party	2,487,551	44.68	149	10	159	–7
Moderate Party	1,187,335	21.33	69	7	76	–10
People's Party	792,268	14.23	42	9	51	+30
Centre Party	490,999	8.82	41	2	43	–13
Left Party Communists	298,419	5.36	8	11	19	–1
Christian Democratic Unity	131,548	2.36	0	0	0	0
Green Party	83,645	1.50	0	0	0	0
Centre (CDU–C)	73,711	1.32	1	0	1	–
Other parties	21,546	0.39	0	0	0	0
Total	5,567,022	100.00	310	39	349	0
Valid votes	5,567,022	99.14				
Invalid/blank votes	48,220	0.86				
Total votes	5,615,242	100.00				
Registered voters/turnout	6,249,445	89.85				
Source: Nohlen & Stöver

== Results by region ==
=== Percentage share ===
Location	Turnout	Share	Votes	S	M	FP	C	VPK	MP	Other	Left	Right
Götaland	90.1	48.1	2,677,728	42.7	22.2	14.8	14.2	4.2	1.5	0.4	46.9	51.2
Svealand	89.8	37.3	2,078,033	43.8	23.9	14.9	8.9	6.3	1.6	0.6	50.1	47.7
Norrland	89.3	14.6	812,261	53.4	12.0	10.7	15.4	6.7	1.3	0.4	60.1	38.2
Total	89.9	100.0	5,567,022	44.7	21.3	14.2	12.5	5.4	1.5	0.4	50.0	48.0
Source: SCB

=== By votes ===
Location	Turnout	Share	Votes	S	M	FP	C	VPK	MP	Other	Left	Right
Götaland	90.1	48.1	2,677,728	1,143,678	593,970	396,228	380,231	113,112	39,501	11,008	1,256,790	1,370,429
Svealand	89.8	37.3	2,077,033	910,319	495,528	309,162	185,650	130,515	33,740	12,119	1,040,834	990,340
Norrland	89.3	14.6	812,261	433,554	97,837	86,878	125,377	54,792	10,404	3,419	488,346	310,092
Total	89.9	100.0	5,567,022	2,487,551	1,187,335	792,268	691,258	298,419	83,645	26,546	2,785,970	2,670,861
Source: SCB

== Results by constituency ==
=== Percentage share ===
Location	Land	Turnout	Share	Votes	S	M	FP	C	VPK	MP	Other	Left	Right	Margin
Location		%	%		%	%	%	%	%	%	%	%	%	
Blekinge	G	89.9	1.8	102,751	51.6	17.6	12.4	12.4	4.4	1.3	0.2	56.0	42.5	13,940
Bohuslän	G	90.0	3.4	191,126	40.3	20.8	19.6	12.7	4.5	1.7	0.3	44.8	53.1	15,942
Gothenburg	G	88.6	5.1	282,569	40.1	22.1	20.4	5.0	9.2	1.8	1.3	49.3	48.2	4,986
Gotland	G	88.9	0.7	37,766	41.8	17.0	10.4	24.4	3.7	2.5	0.2	45.5	51.8	2,376
Gävleborg	N	88.8	3.6	198,530	53.6	12.7	11.2	13.8	6.7	1.6	0.3	60.3	37.7	44,894
Halland	G	90.9	2.9	159,494	38.4	22.7	15.6	18.5	2.9	1.7	0.1	41.3	56.8	24,770
Jämtland	N	88.3	1.6	91,793	51.3	13.6	9.2	19.7	4.6	1.4	0.1	55.9	42.5	12,354
Jönköping	G	91.1	3.7	203,979	40.2	19.4	14.3	21.7	3.1	1.0	0.3	43.3	55.4	24,561
Kalmar	G	89.9	2.9	163,808	46.0	19.8	9.8	19.2	3.8	1.3	0.2	49.8	48.8	1,697
Kopparberg	S	88.7	3.4	191,359	48.5	16.0	11.8	16.3	5.2	1.9	0.3	53.7	44.1	18,457
Kristianstad	G	88.9	3.4	186,634	41.9	24.5	13.5	16.2	2.4	1.2	0.2	44.3	54.2	18,431
Kronoberg	G	90.0	2.1	115,825	40.9	21.0	11.5	20.8	4.3	1.4	0.2	45.2	53.2	9,285
Malmö area	G	89.6	5.5	305,399	44.8	28.4	14.8	5.0	4.4	1.7	0.8	49.3	48.2	3,277
Malmöhus	G	91.0	3.5	195,775	42.4	27.5	13.4	13.5	1.7	1.4	0.2	44.1	54.3	20,139
Norrbotten	N	89.1	3.1	174,171	59.0	10.9	8.1	10.3	10.3	0.8	0.6	69.3	29.3	69,751
Skaraborg	G	90.1	3.3	181,245	40.2	20.4	14.4	20.1	3.3	1.3	0.2	43.6	54.9	20,582
Stockholm	S	88.8	8.1	453,117	38.0	30.2	15.8	3.7	9.6	1.7	0.9	47.6	49.7	9,547
Stockholm County	S	90.5	10.0	559,208	38.3	30.7	17.2	5.8	5.9	1.6	0.6	44.2	53.6	52,966
Södermanland	S	90.8	3.0	166,162	51.6	18.0	13.4	10.9	4.2	1.5	0.4	55.7	42.3	22,272
Uppsala	S	90.2	2.9	162,979	43.3	20.5	15.4	12.7	5.6	1.7	0.8	48.9	48.6	533
Värmland	S	89.8	3.5	192,892	49.4	18.6	12.1	13.5	4.8	1.4	0.1	54.2	44.3	19,124
Västerbotten	N	89.4	3.0	164,748	48.5	11.3	14.5	18.1	5.7	1.2	0.6	54.2	43.9	16,922
Västernorrland	N	90.5	3.3	183,019	53.2	12.2	10.0	17.6	5.4	1.3	0.3	58.6	39.8	34,333
Västmanland	S	89.7	3.0	167,297	51.7	17.0	13.8	10.4	5.3	1.3	0.4	57.0	41.3	26,201
Älvsborg N	G	90.5	3.0	164,722	42.7	18.4	16.5	16.5	4.2	1.6	0.2	46.9	51.4	7,464
Älvsborg S	G	91.5	2.2	120,076	42.0	21.8	14.0	17.1	3.7	1.1	0.3	45.7	52.8	8,519
Örebro	S	90.1	3.3	184,019	50.6	15.5	13.5	12.6	5.4	1.6	0.7	56.0	41.7	26,420
Östergötland	G	90.6	4.8	266,559	47.5	20.6	12.9	13.0	4.4	1.3	0.3	51.9	46.5	14,530
Total		89.9	100.0	5,567,022	44.7	21.3	14.2	12.5	5.4	1.5	0.4	50.0	48.0	115,109
Source: SCB

=== By votes ===
Location	Land	Turnout	Share	Votes	S	M	FP	C	VPK	MP	Other	Left	Right	Margin
Location		%	%											
Blekinge	G	89.9	1.8	102,751	53,026	18,067	12,778	12,791	4,550	1,365	174	57,576	43,636	13,940
Bohuslän	G	90.0	3.4	191,126	77,075	39,783	37,468	24,319	8,553	3,329	599	85,628	101,570	15,942
Gothenburg	G	88.6	5.1	282,569	113,270	62,325	57,730	14,242	26,013	5,216	3,773	139,283	134,297	4,986
Gotland	G	88.9	0.7	37,766	15,791	6,437	3,928	9,204	1,402	938	66	17,193	19,569	2,376
Gävleborg	N	88.8	3.6	198,530	106,413	25,253	22,142	27,496	13,372	3,214	640	119,785	74,891	44,894
Halland	G	90.9	2.9	159,494	61,291	36,273	24,877	29,510	4,599	2,705	239	65,890	90,660	24,770
Jämtland	N	88.3	1.6	91,793	47,107	12,509	8,449	18,046	4,251	1,311	120	51,358	39,004	12,354
Jönköping	G	91.1	3.7	203,979	82,093	39,646	29,091	44,207	6,290	2,114	538	88,383	112,944	24,561
Kalmar	G	89.9	2.9	163,808	75,298	32,364	16,001	31,499	6,263	2,102	281	81,561	79,864	1,697
Kopparberg	S	88.7	3.4	191,359	92,860	30,610	22,542	31,216	9,965	3,610	556	102,825	84,368	18,457
Kristianstad	G	88.9	3.4	186,634	78,251	45,791	25,135	30,246	4,490	2,289	432	82,741	101,172	18,431
Kronoberg	G	90.0	2.1	115,825	47,352	24,309	13,281	24,039	4,992	1,632	220	52,344	61,629	9,285
Malmö area	G	89.6	5.5	305,399	136,922	86,749	45,312	15,174	13,590	5,257	2,395	150,512	147,235	3,277
Malmöhus	G	91.0	3.5	195,775	82,966	53,804	26,137	26,454	3,290	2,694	430	86,256	106,395	20,139
Norrbotten	N	89.1	3.1	174,171	102,692	18,988	14,026	17,950	18,023	1,433	1,059	120,715	50,964	69,751
Skaraborg	G	90.1	3.3	181,245	72,915	37,047	26,122	36,347	6,019	2,444	351	78,934	99,516	20,582
Stockholm	S	88.8	8.1	453,117	172,352	136,899	71,639	16,745	43,384	7,870	4,228	215,736	225,283	9,547
Stockholm County	S	90.5	10.0	559,208	214,044	171,700	96,061	32,196	32,947	9,078	3,182	246,991	299,957	52,966
Södermanland	S	90.8	3.0	166,162	85,681	29,905	22,315	18,131	6,942	2,567	621	92,623	70,351	22,272
Uppsala	S	90.2	2.9	162,979	70,602	33,377	25,133	20,629	9,070	2,850	1,318	79,672	79,139	533
Värmland	S	89.8	3.5	192,892	95,203	35,914	23,398	26,111	9,344	2,683	239	104,547	85,423	19,124
Västerbotten	N	89.4	3.0	164,748	79,958	18,671	23,955	29,745	9,335	2,045	1,039	89,293	72,371	16,922
Västernorrland	N	90.5	3.3	183,019	97,384	22,416	18,306	32,140	9,811	2,401	561	107,195	72,862	34,333
Västmanland	S	89.7	3.0	167,297	86,496	28,515	23,147	17,480	8,847	2,165	647	95,343	69,142	26,201
Älvsborg N	G	90.5	3.0	164,722	70,275	30,319	27,182	27,152	6,914	2,585	295	77,189	84,653	7,464
Älvsborg S	G	91.5	2.2	120,076	50,458	26,140	16,838	20,474	4,475	1,366	325	54,933	63,452	8,519
Örebro	S	90.1	3.3	184,019	93,081	28,608	24,927	23,142	10,016	2,917	1,328	103,097	76,677	26,420
Östergötland	G	90.6	4.8	266,559	126,695	54,916	34,348	34,573	11,672	3,465	890	138,367	123,837	14,530
Total		89.9	100.0	5,567,022	2,487,551	1,187,335	792,268	691,258	298,419	83,645	26,546	2,785,970	2,670,861	115,109
Source: SCB

== 1982–1985 bloc comparison ==
=== Percentage share ===
Constituency	Land	Votes 1982	Left 1982	Right 1982	Win 1982	Votes 1985	Left 1985	Right 1985	Win 1985	Change
Constituency			%	%	%		%	%	%	%
Blekinge	G	103,262	56.76	40.09	16.67	102,751	56.03	42.47	13.56	3.11
Bohuslän	G	186,663	45.08	50.97	5.89	191,126	44.80	53.14	8.34	2.45
Gothenburg	G	285,891	50.85	44.91	5.94	282,569	49.29	47.53	1.76	4.18
Gotland	G	37,646	45.83	50.80	4.97	37,766	45.53	51.82	6.29	1.32
Gävleborg	N	202,022	61.11	35.25	25.86	198,530	60.34	37.72	22.62	3.24
Halland	G	155,884	41.02	55.84	14.82	159,494	41.31	56.84	15.53	0.71
Jämtland	N	92,758	56.61	40.15	16.46	91,793	55.95	42.49	13.46	3.00
Jönköping	G	204,335	43.09	48.87	5.78	203,979	43.33	55.37	12.04	6.26
Kalmar	G	165,881	49.93	46.38	3.55	163,808	49.71	48.75	0.96	2.59
Kopparberg	S	194,260	55.04	41.24	13.80	191,359	53.73	44.09	9.64	4.16
Kristianstad	G	187,725	44.28	52.32	8.04	186,634	44.33	54.21	9.88	1.84
Kronoberg	G	115,714	45.36	51.00	5.64	115,825	45.19	53.21	8.02	2.38
Malmö area	G	306,611	52.33	44.72	7.61	305,399	49.28	48.21	1.07	6.54
Malmöhus	G	193,995	45.53	52.19	6.66	195,775	44.06	54.35	10.29	3.63
Norrbotten	N	175,156	69.16	26.48	42.68	174,171	69.31	29.26	40.05	2.63
Skaraborg	G	181,020	43.07	52.57	9.50	181,245	43.55	54.91	11.36	1.86
Stockholm	S	453,535	49.46	46.88	2.58	453,117	47.61	49.72	2.11	4.69
Stockholm County	S	535,603	46.57	49.92	3.35	559,208	44.17	53.64	9.47	6.12
Södermanland	S	166,737	56.93	39.57	17.36	166,162	55.74	42.34	13.40	3.96
Uppsala	S	160,073	50.69	45.48	5.21	162,979	48.88	48.56	0.32	4.89
Värmland	S	196,415	55.16	42.25	12.91	192,892	54.20	44.29	9.91	3.00
Västerbotten	N	165,350	54.81	39.73	15.08	164,748	54.20	43.93	10.27	4.81
Västernorrland	N	186,181	58.98	37.11	21.87	183,019	58.57	39.81	18.76	3.11
Västmanland	S	167,995	58.16	38.67	19.49	167,297	56.99	41.33	15.66	3.83
Älvsborg N	G	162,681	46.95	49.34	2.39	164,722	46.86	51.39	4.53	2.14
Älvsborg S	G	120,376	46.00	50.55	4.55	120,076	45.75	52.84	7.09	2.54
Örebro	S	185,686	57.62	37.94	19.68	184,019	56.03	41.67	14.36	5.32
Östergötland	G	265,147	53.01	43.01	10.00	266,559	51.91	46.46	5.45	4.55
Total		5,554,602	51.17	45.02	6.15	5,567,022	50.04	47.98	2.06	4.09
Source: SCB

=== By votes ===
Constituency	Land	Votes 1982	Left 1982	Right 1982	Win 1982	Votes 1985	Left 1985	Right 1985	Win 1985	Change
Constituency	#									
Blekinge	G	103,262	58,613	41,393	17,220	102,751	57,576	43,636	13,940	3,280
Bohuslän	G	186,663	84,147	95,149	11,002	191,126	85,628	101,570	15,942	4,940
Gothenburg	G	285,891	145,363	128,390	16,973	282,569	139,283	134,297	4,986	11,987
Gotland	G	37,646	17,252	19,126	1,874	37,766	17,193	19,569	2,376	502
Gävleborg	N	202,022	123,458	71,208	52,250	198,530	119,785	74,891	44,894	7,356
Halland	G	155,884	63,938	87,048	23,110	159,494	65,890	90,660	24,770	1,660
Jämtland	N	92,758	52,512	37,239	15,273	91,793	51,358	39,004	12,354	2,919
Jönköping	G	204,335	88,054	99,868	11,814	203,979	88,383	112,944	24,561	12,747
Kalmar	G	165,881	82,829	76,943	5,886	163,808	81,561	79,864	1,697	4,189
Kopparberg	S	194,260	106,927	80,116	26,811	191,359	102,825	84,368	18,457	8,354
Kristianstad	G	187,725	83,123	98,212	15,089	186,634	82,741	101,172	18,431	3,342
Kronoberg	G	115,714	52,487	59,017	6,530	115,825	52,344	61,629	9,285	2,755
Malmö area	G	306,611	160,448	137,116	23,332	305,399	150,512	147,235	3,277	20,055
Malmöhus	G	193,995	88,318	101,253	12,935	195,775	86,256	106,395	20,139	7,204
Norrbotten	N	175,156	121,136	46,379	74,757	174,171	120,715	50,964	69,751	5,006
Skaraborg	G	181,020	77,959	95,168	17,209	181,245	78,934	99,516	20,582	3,373
Stockholm	S	453,535	224,302	212,600	11,702	453,117	215,736	225,283	9,547	21,249
Stockholm County	S	535,603	249,415	267,398	17,983	559,208	246,991	299,957	52,966	34,983
Södermanland	S	166,737	94,916	65,976	28,940	166,162	92,623	70,351	22,272	6,668
Uppsala	S	160,073	81,145	72,806	8,339	162,979	79,672	79,139	533	7,806
Värmland	S	196,415	108,350	82,983	25,367	192,892	104,547	85,423	19,124	6,243
Västerbotten	N	165,350	90,633	65,697	24,936	164,748	89,293	72,371	16,922	8,014
Västernorrland	N	186,181	109,811	69,098	40,713	183,019	107,195	72,862	34,333	6,380
Västmanland	S	167,995	97,712	64,958	32,754	167,297	95,343	69,142	26,201	6,553
Älvsborg N	G	162,681	76,381	80,263	3,882	164,722	77,189	84,653	7,464	3,582
Älvsborg S	G	120,376	55,374	60,846	5,472	120,076	54,933	63,452	8,519	3,047
Örebro	S	185,686	106,998	70,441	36,557	184,019	103,097	76,677	26,420	10,137
Östergötland	G	265,147	140,548	114,034	26,514	266,559	138,367	123,837	14,530	11,984
Total		5,554,602	2,842,149	2,500,725	341,424	5,567,022	2,785,970	2,670,861	115,109	226,315
Source: SCB

== Municipal results ==
Votes by municipality. The municipalities are the color of the party that got the most votes within the coalition that won relative majority.

Cartogram of the map to the left with each municipality rescaled to the number of valid votes cast.

Map showing the voting shifts from the 1982 to the 1985 election. Darker blue indicates a municipality voted more towards the parties that formed the centre-right bloc. Darker red indicates a municipality voted more towards the parties that form the left-wing bloc.

Votes by municipality as a scale from red/Left-wing bloc to blue/Centre-right bloc.

Cartogram of vote with each municipality rescaled in proportion to number of valid votes cast. Deeper blue represents a relative majority for the centre-right coalition, brighter red represents a relative majority for the left-wing coalition.

=== Blekinge ===
Location	Turnout	Share	Votes	S	M	FP	C	VPK	MP	Other	L-vote	R-vote	Left	Right	Margin
Location		%			%	%	%	%	%	%			%	%	
Karlshamn	89.3	21.0	21,543	54.3	15.8	11.6	11.0	5.8	1.3	0.1	12,963	8,263	60.2	38.4	4,700
Karlskrona	90.2	40.0	41,135	49.1	19.1	13.9	12.3	4.2	1.3	0.2	21,914	18,629	53.3	45.3	3,285
Olofström	89.2	9.2	9,496	55.8	13.2	11.3	13.4	5.0	1.2	0.1	5,775	3,593	60.8	37.8	2,182
Ronneby	90.2	19.4	19,923	52.5	16.5	11.2	14.2	3.9	1.5	0.2	11,231	8,357	56.4	41.9	2,874
Sölvesborg	90.1	10.4	10,654	50.4	21.4	11.8	11.8	3.1	1.4	0.2	5,693	4,794	53.4	45.0	899
Total	89.9	1.8	102,751	51.6	17.6	12.4	12.4	4.4	1.3	0.2	57,576	43,636	56.0	42.5	13,940
Source: SCB

=== Dalarna ===
Kopparberg County

Location	Turnout	Share	Votes	S	M	FP	C	VPK	MP	Other	L-vote	R-vote	Left	Right	Margin
Location		%			%	%	%	%	%	%			%	%	
Avesta	90.1	9.0	17,284	58.0	11.3	8.8	14.3	5.9	1.6	0.1	11,049	5,930	63.9	34.3	5,119
Borlänge	89.3	16.1	30,769	54.2	14.5	10.9	11.1	5.9	2.4	1.1	18,480	11,236	60.1	36.5	7,244
Falun	88.4	18.0	34,444	40.8	22.1	15.9	14.9	4.4	1.7	0.2	15,578	18,203	45.2	52.8	2,625
Gagnef	90.6	3.4	6,464	45.0	14.0	11.4	24.1	3.3	2.1	0.1	3,123	3,195	48.3	49.4	72
Hedemora	89.5	5.9	11,337	49.5	14.5	10.8	17.0	5.7	2.4	0.1	6,259	4,789	55.2	42.2	1,470
Leksand	88.8	5.0	9,561	36.8	19.9	13.2	25.3	2.9	1.7	0.1	3,802	5,590	39.8	58.5	1,788
Ludvika	89.3	10.8	20,718	59.5	12.0	9.3	8.5	8.9	1.7	0.2	14,165	6,174	68.4	29.8	7,991
Malung	90.5	4.3	8,272	47.9	16.7	11.7	18.4	3.6	1.6	0.1	4,258	3,874	51.5	46.8	384
Mora	86.2	6.7	12,905	41.4	18.0	12.9	22.2	3.6	1.7	0.2	5,804	6,856	45.0	53.1	1,052
Orsa	85.3	2.5	4,826	42.4	16.9	12.6	19.4	5.7	3.0	0.0	2,320	2,359	48.1	48.9	39
Rättvik	84.0	3.8	7,318	36.8	19.3	15.6	22.9	3.6	1.8	0.1	2,950	4,233	40.3	57.8	1,283
Smedjebacken	91.1	4.6	8,842	61.7	10.4	8.2	11.7	6.5	1.4	0.2	6,026	2,681	68.2	30.3	3,345
Säter	89.3	3.8	7,344	43.1	16.1	11.4	23.1	4.5	1.6	0.1	3,497	3,715	47.6	50.6	218
Vansbro	89.4	3.0	5,742	46.0	13.9	9.5	24.6	4.1	1.6	0.2	2,882	2,758	50.2	48.0	124
Älvdalen	85.4	2.9	5,533	43.8	14.5	10.1	25.6	3.7	2.2	0.1	2,632	2,775	47.6	50.2	143
Total	88.7	3.4	191,359	48.5	16.0	11.8	16.3	5.2	1.9	0.3	102,825	84,368	53.7	44.1	18,457
Source: SCB

=== Gotland ===
Location	Turnout	Share	Votes	S	M	FP	C	VPK	MP	Other	L-vote	R-vote	Left	Right	Margin
Location		%			%	%	%	%	%	%			%	%	
Gotland	88.9	100.0	37,766	41.8	17.0	10.4	24.4	3.7	2.5	0.2	17,193	19,569	45.5	51.8	2,376
Total	88.9	0.7	37,766	41.8	17.0	10.4	24.4	3.7	2.5	0.2	17,193	19,569	45.5	51.8	2,376
Source: SCB

=== Gävleborg ===
Location	Turnout	Share	Votes	S	M	FP	C	VPK	MP	Other	L-vote	R-vote	Left	Right	Margin
Location		%			%	%	%	%	%	%			%	%	
Bollnäs	87.8	9.6	18,990	49.8	12.4	11.8	17.5	6.7	1.7	0.1	10,737	7,911	56.5	41.7	2,826
Gävle	89.2	30.4	60,379	54.5	15.8	13.9	7.5	6.3	1.7	0.3	36,693	22,483	60.8	37.2	14,210
Hofors	90.4	4.3	8,532	65.9	8.6	7.5	7.5	9.7	0.7	0.1	6,451	2,010	75.6	23.6	4,441
Hudiksvall	87.0	12.6	25,016	47.2	12.1	10.3	20.8	7.4	2.1	0.1	13,651	10,807	54.6	43.2	2,844
Ljusdal	84.9	7.2	14,244	47.4	11.4	11.2	19.5	8.5	1.8	0.2	7,964	5,998	55.9	42.1	1,966
Nordanstig	87.4	3.9	7,795	44.9	9.1	8.8	28.5	6.0	2.6	0.1	3,969	3,619	50.9	46.4	350
Ockelbo	87.3	2.3	4,477	52.9	10.3	7.8	21.9	5.7	1.2	0.2	2,623	1,791	58.6	40.0	832
Ovanåker	90.6	4.7	9,412	44.6	10.9	12.0	27.0	2.8	2.4	0.3	4,460	4,703	47.4	50.0	243
Sandviken	91.2	14.4	28,505	59.1	12.6	9.6	10.2	6.4	1.0	1.1	18,661	9,239	65.5	32.4	9,422
Söderhamn	89.6	10.7	21,180	61.2	10.3	8.6	11.0	7.7	1.2	0.1	14,576	6,330	68.8	29.9	8,246
Total	88.8	3.6	198,530	53.6	12.7	11.2	13.8	6.7	1.6	0.3	119,785	74,891	60.3	37.7	44,894
Source: SCB

=== Halland ===
Location	Turnout	Share	Votes	S	M	FP	C	VPK	MP	Other	L-vote	R-vote	Left	Right	Margin
Location		%			%	%	%	%	%	%			%	%	
Falkenberg	90.9	15.0	23,951	37.6	19.5	12.9	25.9	2.4	1.6	0.1	9,589	13,944	40.0	58.2	4,355
Halmstad	90.7	32.6	51,948	45.1	22.5	15.5	11.1	3.7	2.0	0.2	25,359	25,483	48.8	49.1	124
Hylte	90.2	4.5	7,245	40.8	14.6	11.4	30.0	1.4	1.6	0.1	3,062	4,059	42.3	56.0	997
Kungsbacka	92.1	19.7	31,489	28.5	31.4	22.2	13.7	2.5	1.6	0.2	9,763	21,167	31.0	67.2	11,404
Laholm	89.6	8.8	14,108	31.1	22.8	11.4	31.0	1.9	1.7	0.1	4,656	9,203	33.0	65.2	4,547
Varberg	90.9	19.3	30,753	40.8	18.8	14.2	21.7	3.0	1.4	0.2	13,461	16,804	43.8	54.6	3,343
Total	90.9	2.9	159,494	38.4	22.7	15.6	18.5	2.9	1.7	0.1	65,890	90,660	41.3	56.8	24,770
Source: SCB

=== Jämtland ===
Location	Turnout	Share	Votes	S	M	FP	C	VPK	MP	Other	L-vote	R-vote	Left	Right	Margin
Location		%			%	%	%	%	%	%			%	%	
Berg	86.1	6.4	5,899	43.7	13.0	6.6	32.4	3.4	0.9	0.1	2,780	3,064	47.1	51.9	284
Bräcke	89.3	6.7	6,146	58.7	10.5	5.6	19.1	5.2	0.8	0.1	3,926	2,165	63.9	35.2	1,761
Härjedalen	85.7	9.4	8,671	58.9	12.3	7.3	15.5	4.6	1.4	0.1	5,505	3,040	63.5	35.1	2,465
Krokom	88.9	10.0	9,187	46.5	12.8	7.9	26.9	4.1	1.6	0.1	4,654	4,373	50.7	47.6	281
Ragunda	89.7	5.6	5,185	58.3	8.6	6.0	20.9	4.5	1.6	0.1	3,259	1,837	62.9	35.4	1,422
Strömsund	88.4	12.7	11,616	59.4	9.6	5.4	19.9	4.6	1.0	0.1	7,433	4,051	64.0	34.9	3,382
Åre	87.9	7.2	6,644	43.8	15.1	10.8	24.4	4.0	1.8	0.2	3,175	3,338	47.8	50.2	163
Östersund	88.9	41.9	38,445	48.6	16.4	12.2	15.9	5.0	1.6	0.2	20,626	17,136	53.7	44.6	3,490
Total	88.3	1.6	91,793	51.3	13.6	9.2	19.7	4.6	1.4	0.1	51,358	39,004	55.9	42.5	12,354
Source: SCB

=== Jönköping ===
Location	Turnout	Share	Votes	S	M	FP	C	VPK	MP	Other	L-vote	R-vote	Left	Right	Margin
Location		%			%	%	%	%	%	%			%	%	
Aneby	91.8	2.3	4,638	29.3	18.5	14.0	35.0	1.7	1.4	0.2	1,438	3,129	31.0	67.5	1,691
Eksjö	90.1	6.0	12,277	34.2	20.7	15.0	26.3	2.3	1.5	0.1	4,478	7,608	36.5	62.0	3,130
Gislaved	91.0	8.8	17,993	39.6	19.8	13.9	22.8	2.4	1.2	0.2	7,565	10,174	42.0	56.5	2,609
Gnosjö	92.1	2.8	5,714	33.7	21.2	15.9	25.7	2.7	0.7	0.2	2,078	3,587	36.4	62.8	1,509
Jönköping	91.1	36.0	73,421	43.5	20.1	15.0	16.2	3.8	0.9	0.4	34,733	37,708	47.3	51.4	2,975
Nässjö	92.0	10.7	21,772	45.3	16.7	13.0	20.6	3.2	1.0	0.2	10,553	10,958	48.5	50.3	405
Sävsjö	90.1	3.8	7,808	28.5	21.9	13.7	33.5	1.5	0.7	0.3	2,338	5,397	29.9	69.1	3,059
Tranås	90.7	6.2	12,684	44.5	19.5	15.1	17.0	2.8	1.0	0.2	6,001	6,535	47.3	51.5	534
Vaggeryd	92.3	4.0	8,140	39.9	17.0	12.6	25.9	3.8	0.8	0.1	3,551	4,520	43.6	55.5	969
Vetlanda	90.4	9.3	19,024	35.3	18.0	13.2	29.7	2.7	1.0	0.1	7,231	11,567	38.0	60.8	4,336
Värnamo	91.4	10.1	20,508	38.3	19.8	13.7	23.8	2.7	1.3	0.3	8,417	11,761	41.0	57.3	3,344
Total	91.1	3.7	203,979	40.2	19.4	14.3	21.7	3.1	1.0	0.3	88,383	112,944	43.3	55.4	24,561
Source: SCB

=== Kalmar ===
Location	Turnout	Share	Votes	S	M	FP	C	VPK	MP	Other	L-vote	R-vote	Left	Right	Margin
Location		%			%	%	%	%	%	%			%	%	
Borgholm	89.0	4.7	7,714	28.2	22.1	9.9	35.6	2.1	1.8	0.2	2,346	5,216	30.4	67.6	2,870
Emmaboda	90.1	4.5	7,398	48.0	14.7	7.9	24.5	3.2	1.6	0.1	3,784	3,483	51.1	47.1	301
Hultsfred	90.3	7.2	11,825	46.3	16.2	8.0	24.9	3.8	0.7	0.1	5,924	5,809	50.1	49.1	115
Högsby	90.7	3.2	5,287	46.7	15.7	7.2	24.9	4.4	1.0	0.1	2,700	2,530	51.1	47.9	170
Kalmar	89.7	22.8	37,344	46.5	24.4	11.7	11.6	3.9	1.7	0.2	18,823	17,824	50.4	47.7	999
Mönsterås	90.4	5.5	8,983	50.8	17.4	8.0	17.6	4.6	1.4	0.2	4,980	3,857	55.4	42.9	1,123
Mörbylånga	90.7	5.2	8,463	36.5	24.2	11.4	24.3	2.2	1.3	0.1	3,277	5,068	38.7	59.9	1,791
Nybro	90.4	8.8	14,370	47.8	17.1	8.6	21.7	3.8	0.8	0.1	7,422	6,813	51.6	47.4	609
Oskarshamn	90.0	11.4	18,673	50.6	18.9	11.2	13.6	4.4	1.1	0.2	10,270	8,161	55.0	43.7	2,109
Torsås	89.8	3.3	5,372	35.9	19.8	8.6	33.1	1.6	0.7	0.2	2,017	3,305	37.5	61.5	1,288
Vimmerby	90.2	6.6	10,880	38.2	19.2	8.7	29.8	3.0	1.0	0.2	4,483	6,273	41.2	57.7	1,790
Västervik	89.5	16.8	27,499	51.6	18.0	9.2	14.7	4.9	1.4	0.2	15,535	11,525	56.5	41.9	4,010
Total	89.9	2.9	163,808	46.0	19.8	9.8	19.2	3.8	1.3	0.2	81,561	79,864	49.8	48.8	1,697
Source: SCB

=== Kronoberg ===
Location	Turnout	Share	Votes	S	M	FP	C	VPK	MP	Other	L-vote	R-vote	Left	Right	Margin
Location		%			%	%	%	%	%	%			%	%	
Alvesta	89.9	11.1	12,871	40.5	19.7	10.0	24.9	3.6	1.1	0.2	5,668	7,042	44.0	54.7	1,374
Lessebo	92.5	5.2	5,997	55.7	14.9	7.7	12.5	7.7	1.3	0.1	3,805	2,104	63.4	35.1	1,701
Ljungby	89.2	15.4	17,867	37.9	19.6	11.9	26.0	3.3	1.2	0.1	7,353	10,286	41.2	57.6	2,933
Markaryd	88.4	6.3	7,280	44.5	18.0	10.3	22.2	3.3	1.7	0.1	3,474	3,671	47.7	50.4	197
Tingsryd	88.8	8.4	9,702	35.6	21.9	8.3	29.3	3.5	1.2	0.1	3,792	5,777	39.1	59.5	1,985
Uppvidinge	89.8	6.3	7,308	45.2	15.0	7.9	25.2	5.6	1.0	0.1	3,709	3,517	50.8	48.1	192
Växjö	90.5	38.1	44,165	39.5	23.8	14.2	15.7	4.9	1.7	0.3	19,595	23,708	44.4	53.7	4,113
Älmhult	90.2	9.2	10,635	43.4	21.8	9.5	20.7	3.1	1.4	0.1	4,948	5,524	46.5	51.9	576
Total	90.0	2.1	115,825	40.9	21.0	11.5	20.8	4.3	1.4	0.2	52,344	61,629	45.2	53.2	9,285
Source: SCB

=== Norrbotten ===
Location	Turnout	Share	Votes	S	M	FP	C	VPK	MP	Other	L-vote	R-vote	Left	Right	Margin
Location		%			%	%	%	%	%	%			%	%	
Arjeplog	83.9	1.5	2,613	50.1	9.4	9.0	14.3	16.1	0.8	0.2	1,731	854	66.2	32.7	877
Arvidsjaur	90.1	3.4	5,836	60.1	8.0	8.4	11.9	10.8	0.5	0.3	4,141	1,649	71.0	28.3	2,492
Boden	90.3	11.5	19,974	59.2	13.3	9.3	9.8	7.5	0.6	0.2	13,331	6,482	66.7	32.5	6,849
Gällivare	85.4	8.9	15,443	56.6	11.9	6.0	5.7	18.1	0.6	1.2	11,536	3,632	74.7	23.5	7,904
Haparanda	85.2	3.0	5,163	54.2	16.4	4.5	17.6	5.9	1.1	0.3	3,101	1,991	60.1	38.6	1,110
Jokkmokk	82.6	2.6	4,460	61.8	10.8	9.0	6.4	9.6	2.3	0.2	3,181	1,171	71.3	26.3	2,010
Kalix	90.4	7.5	12,982	66.2	9.1	6.7	11.3	5.8	0.8	0.2	9,348	3,511	72.0	27.1	5,837
Kiruna	84.9	9.5	16,597	60.9	9.0	6.9	4.8	16.2	0.7	1.4	12,801	3,438	77.1	20.7	9,363
Luleå	90.5	25.7	44,833	55.5	13.3	10.8	9.1	9.4	1.1	0.9	29,081	14,878	64.9	33.2	14,203
Pajala	87.4	3.3	5,791	53.0	10.4	4.9	11.6	19.6	0.4	0.2	4,203	1,556	72.6	26.9	2,647
Piteå	92.6	15.3	26,562	63.3	8.3	7.3	13.7	6.4	0.8	0.3	18,513	7,766	69.7	29.2	10,747
Älvsbyn	91.1	3.8	6,536	62.4	6.2	6.6	13.2	10.1	0.7	0.7	4,737	1,702	72.5	26.0	3,035
Överkalix	88.1	2.0	3,431	65.3	5.9	5.2	13.2	9.8	0.5	0.1	2,575	834	75.1	24.3	1,741
Övertorneå	88.0	2.3	3,950	49.8	10.3	4.6	23.1	11.8	0.3	0.1	2,436	1,500	61.7	38.0	936
Total	89.1	3.1	174,171	59.0	10.9	8.1	10.3	10.3	0.8	0.6	120,715	50,964	69.3	29.3	69,751
Source: SCB

=== Skåne ===
Skåne was divided into two separate counties at the time. Malmöhus was divided into Fyrstadskretsen (Four-city constituency) based around the Öresund urban areas and one covering the more rural parts of the county. Kristianstad County was one constituency for the whole county.

==== Kristianstad ====
Location	Turnout	Share	Votes	S	M	FP	C	VPK	MP	Other	L-vote	R-vote	Left	Right	Margin
Location		%			%	%	%	%	%	%			%	%	
Bromölla	90.2	4.2	7,807	64.2	12.3	10.1	7.4	5.0	0.8	0.1	5,405	2,328	69.2	29.8	3,077
Båstad	90.1	4.6	8,579	19.3	36.3	16.6	24.4	1.1	1.8	0.4	1,756	6,632	20.5	77.3	4,876
Hässleholm	89.2	17.4	32,496	39.3	23.1	13.5	20.2	2.6	1.2	0.2	13,588	18,450	41.8	56.8	4,862
Klippan	87.6	5.6	10,488	42.8	25.5	11.7	16.8	1.7	1.3	0.2	4,676	5,660	44.6	54.0	984
Kristianstad	89.6	25.4	47,469	45.7	23.6	14.8	11.7	2.7	1.3	0.2	22,954	23,811	48.4	50.2	857
Osby	88.9	4.9	9,156	47.0	17.2	12.5	19.1	2.9	1.0	0.2	4,576	4,472	50.0	48.8	104
Perstorp	89.5	2.5	4,626	46.8	22.8	11.9	14.8	2.7	0.7	0.3	2,287	2,290	49.4	49.5	3
Simrishamn	86.1	7.3	13,552	39.9	25.7	13.8	16.7	1.8	1.6	0.6	5,653	7,608	41.7	56.1	1,955
Tomelilla	86.4	4.4	8,212	36.1	24.4	11.2	25.7	1.5	1.0	0.2	3,081	5,034	37.5	61.3	1,953
Åstorp	89.5	4.1	7,728	50.8	23.6	10.9	11.2	2.3	0.5	0.6	4,106	3,537	53.1	45.8	569
Ängelholm	89.0	11.2	20,900	32.5	33.6	14.9	15.3	1.9	1.6	0.1	7,202	13,335	34.5	63.8	6,133
Örkelljunga	87.7	3.2	5,921	29.3	31.4	13.7	23.9	0.8	0.9	0.1	1,777	4,084	30.0	69.0	2,307
Östra Göinge	89.6	5.2	9,700	55.1	15.4	10.7	14.4	3.5	0.7	0.2	5,680	3,931	58.6	40.5	1,749
Total	88.9	3.4	186,634	41.9	24.5	13.5	16.2	2.4	1.2	0.2	82,741	101,172	44.3	54.2	18,431
Source: SCB

==== Malmö area ====
Location	Turnout	Share	Votes	S	M	FP	C	VPK	MP	Other	L-vote	R-vote	Left	Right	Margin
Location		%			%	%	%	%	%	%			%	%	
Helsingborg	88.9	23.0	70,332	43.9	28.2	16.1	6.1	3.7	1.7	0.5	33,457	35,392	47.6	50.3	1,935
Landskrona	90.0	7.8	23,758	54.9	24.4	10.5	5.3	3.4	1.2	0.2	13,848	9,558	58.3	40.2	4,290
Lund	91.9	17.7	53,965	37.0	27.6	17.1	7.7	7.3	3.1	0.4	23,888	28,223	44.3	52.3	4,335
Malmö	89.1	51.5	157,344	46.4	29.4	14.2	3.5	4.0	1.4	1.2	79,319	74,062	50.4	47.1	5,257
Total	89.6	5.5	305,399	44.8	28.4	14.8	5.0	4.4	1.7	0.8	150,512	147,235	49.3	48.2	3,277
Source: SCB

==== Malmöhus ====
Location	Turnout	Share	Votes	S	M	FP	C	VPK	MP	Other	L-vote	R-vote	Left	Right	Margin
Location		%			%	%	%	%	%	%			%	%	
Bjuv	90.2	4.4	8,593	57.4	18.3	11.3	9.5	2.6	0.7	0.1	5,161	3,361	60.1	39.1	1,800
Burlöv	91.5	4.8	9,325	53.0	23.5	14.1	4.5	3.3	1.4	0.2	5,254	3,926	56.3	42.1	1,328
Eslöv	89.1	9.0	17,701	45.8	22.2	10.3	17.9	2.3	1.3	0.1	8,514	8,932	48.1	50.5	418
Höganäs	91.7	7.6	14,966	37.4	33.4	15.8	9.4	2.0	1.8	0.2	5,894	8,777	39.4	58.6	2,883
Hörby	88.4	4.4	8,624	28.3	22.7	15.0	30.8	0.9	2.0	0.2	2,523	5,910	29.3	68.5	3,387
Höör	88.8	3.8	7,448	32.5	28.8	14.5	20.3	1.4	2.3	0.2	2,523	4,738	33.9	63.6	2,215
Kävlinge	92.8	6.9	13,497	48.0	25.3	13.0	10.5	2.0	1.2	0.2	6,739	6,575	49.9	48.7	164
Lomma	94.4	5.7	11,239	34.1	37.7	18.8	6.2	1.5	1.5	0.1	4,000	7,056	35.6	62.8	3,056
Sjöbo	87.7	5.1	9,995	35.5	23.2	10.7	27.7	1.2	1.6	0.1	3,675	6,145	36.8	61.5	2,470
Skurup	89.5	4.2	8,317	38.7	23.0	11.9	22.9	1.4	1.6	0.4	3,335	4,809	40.1	57.8	1,474
Staffanstorp	94.0	5.7	11,105	38.7	32.5	15.9	9.7	1.5	1.6	0.1	4,465	6,450	40.2	58.1	1,985
Svalöv	90.4	4.2	8,231	44.1	21.5	9.5	21.4	1.4	1.1	1.0	3,746	4,309	45.5	52.4	563
Svedala	92.9	5.4	10,509	46.4	25.7	14.4	10.7	1.5	0.9	0.5	5,034	5,335	47.9	50.8	301
Trelleborg	90.0	11.7	22,870	54.2	22.0	10.5	10.2	1.7	1.2	0.2	12,794	9,761	55.9	42.7	3,033
Vellinge	94.3	8.5	16,544	27.1	47.8	16.0	7.1	0.7	1.2	0.1	4,599	11,721	27.8	70.8	7,122
Ystad	89.7	8.6	16,811	46.2	24.5	13.4	13.2	1.4	1.1	0.2	8,000	8,590	47.6	51.1	590
Total	91.0	3.5	195,775	42.4	27.5	13.4	13.5	1.7	1.4	0.2	86,256	106,395	44.1	54.3	20,139
Source: SCB

=== Stockholm County ===
==== Stockholm ====
Location	Turnout	Share	Votes	S	M	FP	C	VPK	MP	Other	L-vote	R-vote	Left	Right	Margin
Location		%			%	%	%	%	%	%			%	%	
Stockholm	88.8	100.0	453,117	38.0	30.2	15.8	3.7	9.6	1.7	0.9	215,736	225,283	47.6	49.7	9,547
Total	88.8	8.1	453,117	38.0	30.2	15.8	3.7	9.6	1.7	0.9	215,736	225,283	47.6	49.7	9,547
Source: SCB

==== Stockholm County ====
Location	Turnout	Share	Votes	S	M	FP	C	VPK	MP	Other	L-vote	R-vote	Left	Right	Margin
Location		%			%	%	%	%	%	%			%	%	
Botkyrka	88.2	5.8	32,711	46.0	24.9	15.2	4.7	7.0	1.7	0.4	17,343	14,668	53.0	44.8	2,675
Danderyd	94.5	3.5	19,789	16.5	55.4	20.3	3.5	2.5	1.6	0.2	3,758	15,677	19.0	79.2	11,919
Ekerö	93.2	1.9	10,367	29.1	36.6	19.3	8.5	4.2	1.9	0.3	3,454	6,683	33.3	64.5	3,229
Haninge	89.0	6.2	34,572	44.9	23.8	16.1	5.4	7.7	1.4	0.8	18,163	15,645	52.3	45.3	2,518
Huddinge	89.9	7.4	41,112	40.3	28.4	17.0	4.5	7.1	1.6	1.0	19,513	20,531	47.5	49.9	1,018
Järfälla	91.9	6.2	34,698	41.1	28.5	18.7	4.2	5.7	1.4	0.3	16,238	17,871	46.8	51.5	1,633
Lidingö	92.7	4.6	25,933	22.1	47.5	21.3	3.4	3.8	1.7	0.2	6,712	18,723	25.9	72.2	12,011
Nacka	91.2	6.5	36,355	32.9	35.9	17.8	3.7	6.7	1.6	1.5	14,389	20,851	39.6	57.4	6,462
Norrtälje	89.0	5.0	27,982	42.6	21.4	13.3	17.0	4.4	1.1	0.2	13,134	14,472	46.9	51.7	1,338
Nynäshamn	91.6	2.5	13,979	51.8	18.9	12.1	8.0	6.6	2.3	0.2	8,170	5,447	58.4	39.0	2,723
Salem	91.5	1.3	7,089	37.1	31.1	18.6	6.0	5.3	1.6	0.3	3,005	3,950	42.4	55.7	945
Sigtuna	89.0	3.1	17,182	41.7	28.0	15.6	8.5	4.9	1.1	0.2	8,005	8,954	46.6	52.1	949
Sollentuna	92.3	5.4	30,292	34.0	33.5	19.5	5.6	5.3	1.8	0.3	11,921	17,738	39.4	58.6	5,817
Solna	88.4	6.4	35,936	37.4	32.6	16.3	3.9	7.4	1.6	0.8	16,123	18,959	44.9	52.8	2,836
Sundbyberg	89.1	3.4	18,932	48.6	21.8	15.0	3.4	8.8	1.5	0.9	10,869	7,613	57.4	40.2	3,256
Södertälje	88.2	8.3	46,230	47.1	21.0	15.6	7.1	6.3	1.9	1.1	24,678	20,185	53.4	43.7	4,493
Tyresö	91.8	3.4	19,122	39.0	29.3	17.7	4.4	7.1	2.0	0.6	8,809	9,821	46.1	51.4	1,012
Täby	93.0	6.1	33,992	26.1	42.4	21.4	4.5	3.5	1.7	0.3	10,091	23,227	29.7	68.3	13,136
Upplands-Bro	90.9	2.0	11,237	46.0	24.6	15.1	6.2	6.0	1.9	0.2	5,834	5,158	51.9	45.9	676
Upplands Väsby	89.6	3.4	18,810	43.5	26.5	17.0	5.1	6.0	1.5	0.3	9,318	9,148	49.5	48.6	170
Vallentuna	91.8	2.1	11,798	32.1	34.6	16.3	10.3	4.7	1.8	0.2	4,340	7,220	36.8	61.2	2,880
Vaxholm	91.0	0.7	4,181	34.9	33.9	19.3	4.6	5.1	2.1	0.1	1,672	2,414	40.0	57.7	742
Värmdö	91.5	2.1	11,538	41.4	30.2	14.6	5.5	6.6	1.3	0.3	5,548	5,804	48.1	50.3	256
Österåker	91.5	2.7	15,371	34.3	35.7	18.7	5.4	4.1	1.6	0.2	5,904	9,198	38.4	59.8	3,294
Total	90.5	10.0	559,208	38.3	30.7	17.2	5.8	5.9	1.6	0.6	246,991	299,957	44.2	53.6	52,966
Source: SCB

=== Södermanland ===
Location	Turnout	Share	Votes	S	M	FP	C	VPK	MP	Other	L-vote	R-vote	Left	Right	Margin
Location		%			%	%	%	%	%	%			%	%	
Eskilstuna	89.9	34.5	57,305	54.9	16.9	14.1	8.1	4.4	1.3	0.2	34,011	22,442	59.4	39.2	11,569
Flen	91.2	6.9	11,499	51.9	15.9	10.6	15.3	4.2	1.8	0.3	6,453	4,800	56.1	41.7	1,653
Katrineholm	91.2	13.1	21,821	53.3	15.4	12.1	12.8	3.7	1.3	1.3	12,443	8,803	57.0	40.3	3,640
Nyköping	91.2	26.4	43,865	47.7	20.7	12.9	13.0	3.7	1.8	0.2	22,523	20,467	51.3	46.7	2,056
Oxelösund	91.6	5.2	8,610	61.4	13.8	10.5	4.9	7.8	1.2	0.5	5,959	2,505	69.2	29.1	3,454
Strängnäs	91.2	9.9	16,528	43.0	23.4	17.8	10.3	3.7	1.6	0.2	7,715	8,519	46.7	51.5	804
Vingåker	91.5	3.9	6,534	50.4	13.8	11.9	17.4	3.5	2.8	0.2	3,519	2,815	53.9	43.1	704
Total	90.8	3.0	166,162	51.6	18.0	13.4	10.9	4.2	1.5	0.4	92,623	70,351	55.7	42.3	22,272
Source: SCB

=== Uppsala ===
Location	Turnout	Share	Votes	S	M	FP	C	VPK	MP	Other	L-vote	R-vote	Left	Right	Margin
Location		%			%	%	%	%	%	%			%	%	
Enköping	89.2	13.1	21,345	43.2	20.7	12.9	18.7	2.9	1.4	0.3	9,837	11,155	46.1	52.3	1,318
Håbo	91.2	4.8	7,869	41.2	31.1	14.4	8.0	4.0	1.0	0.2	3,556	4,212	45.2	53.5	656
Tierp	90.6	8.5	13,831	56.0	10.0	10.4	19.5	2.8	0.9	0.3	8,134	5,532	58.8	40.0	2,602
Uppsala	90.3	61.3	99,983	39.3	22.5	17.8	10.3	6.9	2.1	1.1	46,191	50,588	46.2	50.6	4,397
Älvkarleby	92.1	4.0	6,507	72.5	7.8	8.1	5.8	4.8	1.0	0.1	5,029	1,408	77.3	21.6	3,621
Östhammar	88.8	8.2	13,444	47.8	15.8	11.0	19.6	3.6	1.6	0.5	6,925	6,244	51.5	46.4	681
Total	90.2	2.9	162,979	43.3	20.5	15.4	12.7	5.6	1.7	0.8	79,672	79,139	48.9	48.6	533
Source: SCB

=== Värmland ===
Location	Turnout	Share	Votes	S	M	FP	C	VPK	MP	Other	L-vote	R-vote	Left	Right	Margin
Location		%			%	%	%	%	%	%			%	%	
Arvika	87.9	9.4	18,094	45.9	17.5	14.5	14.7	5.5	1.8	0.2	9,296	8,441	51.4	46.7	855
Eda	88.5	3.1	5,994	52.6	13.5	10.0	19.2	3.6	0.8	0.2	3,368	2,566	56.2	42.8	802
Filipstad	89.1	5.0	9,631	62.1	13.8	9.3	7.3	5.9	1.5	0.1	6,544	2,932	67.9	30.4	3,612
Forshaga	92.0	4.0	7,682	57.0	15.6	10.3	12.0	4.0	1.0	0.1	4,685	2,912	61.0	37.9	1,773
Grums	89.6	3.6	6,899	59.8	12.4	8.8	13.0	5.0	0.9	0.1	4,473	2,359	64.8	34.2	2,114
Hagfors	92.0	6.3	12,095	63.6	10.1	5.7	11.7	7.6	1.2	0.1	8,615	3,324	71.2	27.5	5,291
Hammarö	93.2	4.4	8,579	55.7	18.9	13.1	4.9	5.6	1.6	0.1	5,263	3,168	61.3	36.9	2,095
Karlstad	90.5	27.2	52,538	45.2	24.3	14.6	9.2	4.8	1.9	0.2	26,243	25,235	50.0	48.0	1,008
Kil	91.7	3.9	7,497	43.2	22.4	14.1	14.9	3.8	1.6	0.1	3,524	3,848	47.0	51.3	324
Kristinehamn	89.6	9.4	18,125	51.8	17.3	13.5	10.9	5.3	1.1	0.1	10,358	7,548	57.1	41.6	2,810
Munkfors	90.6	1.9	3,599	68.7	8.1	7.8	9.4	4.9	0.9	0.1	2,651	912	73.7	25.3	1,739
Storfors	91.7	1.9	3,628	59.1	13.6	9.5	12.0	4.9	0.8	0.1	2,321	1,276	64.0	35.2	1,045
Sunne	88.9	4.8	9,286	35.1	20.5	11.4	29.9	2.0	1.0	0.0	3,445	5,743	37.1	61.8	2,298
Säffle	89.0	6.5	12,591	43.1	19.3	10.9	22.8	3.0	0.7	0.1	5,804	6,686	46.1	53.1	882
Torsby	88.0	5.5	10,545	49.7	16.5	7.8	17.6	7.0	1.3	0.1	5,978	4,423	56.7	41.9	1,555
Årjäng	83.9	3.2	6,109	30.4	21.0	16.6	28.7	2.0	1.1	0.2	1,979	4,050	32.4	66.3	2,071
Total	89.8	3.5	192,892	49.4	18.6	12.1	13.5	4.8	1.4	0.1	104,547	85,423	54.2	44.3	19,124
Source: SCB

=== Västerbotten ===
Location	Turnout	Share	Votes	S	M	FP	C	VPK	MP	Other	L-vote	R-vote	Left	Right	Margin
Location		%			%	%	%	%	%	%			%	%	
Bjurholm	88.5	1.3	2,207	36.4	14.7	20.3	26.1	1.3	1.0	0.3	832	1,347	37.7	61.0	515
Dorotea	87.5	1.6	2,649	56.5	6.2	11.4	17.7	7.2	1.0	0.1	1,686	934	63.6	35.3	752
Lycksele	89.0	5.8	9,633	52.3	9.4	15.4	17.0	5.0	0.8	0.2	5,519	4,021	57.3	41.7	1,498
Malå	88.0	1.7	2,816	56.7	7.9	14.6	13.9	5.6	1.2	0.1	1,755	1,026	62.3	36.4	729
Nordmaling	91.1	3.3	5,413	46.7	12.8	10.5	26.3	2.9	0.7	0.2	2,682	2,683	49.5	49.6	1
Norsjö	86.7	2.2	3,665	50.5	8.5	16.2	18.4	5.6	0.8	0.1	2,055	1,577	56.1	43.0	478
Robertsfors	90.4	3.2	5,218	36.2	10.4	14.1	35.5	2.9	0.8	0.2	2,040	3,129	39.1	60.0	1,089
Skellefteå	89.8	30.6	50,354	53.1	9.6	13.7	17.4	4.9	0.8	0.4	29,224	20,491	58.0	40.7	8,733
Sorsele	83.3	1.5	2,448	44.1	9.8	14.6	25.7	4.2	1.3	0.2	1,183	1,228	48.3	50.2	45
Storuman	84.6	3.2	5,344	45.0	14.5	15.9	18.4	4.1	1.9	0.2	2,625	2,608	49.1	48.8	17
Umeå	90.3	33.9	55,930	45.1	13.8	16.0	14.3	7.8	1.8	1.3	29,570	24,635	52.9	44.0	4,935
Vilhelmina	86.7	3.5	5,807	54.7	8.3	10.9	19.2	5.3	1.4	0.1	3,487	2,232	60.0	38.4	1,255
Vindeln	89.4	2.8	4,636	37.9	13.9	17.8	26.6	2.4	1.2	0.2	1,865	2,706	40.2	58.4	841
Vännäs	90.0	3.3	5,479	47.4	10.8	11.1	24.7	4.7	1.0	0.3	2,853	2,554	52.1	46.6	299
Åsele	88.0	1.9	3,149	56.7	8.2	8.8	21.1	4.2	1.0	0.1	1,917	1,200	60.9	38.1	717
Total	89.4	3.0	164,748	48.5	11.3	14.5	18.1	5.7	1.2	0.6	89,293	72,371	54.2	43.9	16,922
Source: SCB

=== Västernorrland ===
Location	Turnout	Share	Votes	S	M	FP	C	VPK	MP	Other	L-vote	R-vote	Left	Right	Margin
Location		%			%	%	%	%	%	%			%	%	
Härnösand	90.4	10.5	19,168	43.8	17.6	11.0	20.5	5.0	1.8	0.2	9,355	9,417	48.8	49.1	62
Kramfors	92.2	10.1	18,511	55.4	9.9	5.6	20.6	7.1	1.3	0.1	11,574	6,681	62.5	36.1	4,893
Sollefteå	90.8	9.9	18,204	60.1	10.4	5.7	16.5	5.6	1.6	0.1	11,957	5,940	65.7	32.6	6,017
Sundsvall	89.6	34.9	63,962	51.8	14.2	12.7	13.6	5.8	1.3	0.5	36,866	25,914	57.6	40.5	10,952
Timrå	91.0	6.8	12,408	60.9	8.2	8.2	14.8	7.0	0.8	0.2	8,423	3,858	67.9	31.1	4,565
Ånge	89.2	5.1	9,248	56.1	8.4	6.7	20.8	6.1	1.9	0.1	5,747	3,319	62.1	35.9	2,428
Örnsköldsvik	91.1	22.7	41,518	52.8	10.6	10.6	21.5	3.3	1.0	0.2	23,273	17,733	56.1	42.7	5,540
Total	90.5	3.3	183,019	53.2	12.2	10.0	17.6	5.4	1.3	0.3	107,195	72,862	58.6	39.8	34,333
Source: SCB

=== Västmanland ===
Location	Turnout	Share	Votes	S	M	FP	C	VPK	MP	Other	L-vote	R-vote	Left	Right	Margin
Location		%			%	%	%	%	%	%			%	%	
Arboga	90.1	5.9	9,859	53.2	16.2	12.2	12.2	4.4	1.7	0.2	5,672	4,000	57.5	40.6	1,672
Fagersta	90.5	5.7	9,493	63.5	13.1	9.6	6.5	6.0	0.9	0.2	6,606	2,778	69.6	29.3	3,828
Hallstahammar	90.0	6.4	10,764	60.7	13.3	10.1	7.4	7.4	0.9	0.2	7,332	3,315	68.1	30.8	4,017
Heby	89.6	5.2	8,726	43.8	12.3	10.1	28.1	4.5	1.0	0.2	4,219	4,404	48.3	50.5	185
Kungsör	91.0	3.3	5,474	49.5	16.4	13.2	13.3	5.0	2.2	0.3	2,985	2,351	54.5	42.9	634
Köping	88.7	10.2	16,986	55.1	13.0	10.5	12.3	6.0	1.2	1.9	10,380	6,075	61.1	35.8	4,305
Norberg	90.6	2.6	4,382	59.9	11.7	7.9	9.5	9.8	1.1	0.2	3,056	1,272	69.7	29.0	1,784
Sala	89.9	8.5	14,238	41.2	17.4	14.2	21.3	3.8	2.0	0.1	6,406	7,531	45.0	52.9	1,125
Skinnskatteberg	90.6	2.0	3,406	61.7	10.6	7.8	12.0	6.6	1.1	0.2	2,328	1,034	68.3	30.4	1,294
Surahammar	91.6	4.1	6,884	65.5	10.1	9.8	6.6	6.9	1.0	0.1	4,981	1,823	72.4	26.5	3,158
Västerås	89.4	46.1	77,085	48.9	20.8	17.2	6.9	4.8	1.2	0.3	41,378	34,559	53.7	44.8	6,819
Total	89.7	3.0	167,297	51.7	17.0	13.8	10.4	5.3	1.3	0.4	95,343	69,142	57.0	41.3	26,201
Source: SCB

=== Västra Götaland ===
Västra Götaland did have three different counties at the time. Those were Göteborg och Bohuslän, Skaraborg and Älvsborg. There were five constituencies, namely two for Göteborg och Bohuslän, one for Skaraborg and two for Älvsborg.

==== Bohuslän ====
Location	Turnout	Share	Votes	S	M	FP	C	VPK	MP	Other	L-vote	R-vote	Left	Right	Margin
Location		%			%	%	%	%	%	%			%	%	
Härryda	91.2	8.1	15,414	37.1	22.9	23.1	9.9	5.1	1.7	0.1	6,519	8,614	42.3	55.9	2,095
Kungälv	92.1	11.0	21,100	39.4	21.7	19.1	13.4	4.2	2.1	0.1	9,196	11,446	43.6	54.2	2,250
Lysekil	90.5	5.3	10,146	53.6	16.3	15.7	8.8	4.2	1.2	0.2	5,859	4,141	57.7	40.8	1,718
Munkedal	88.5	3.7	7,057	39.9	17.0	12.8	25.1	2.8	2.2	0.2	3,014	3,874	42.7	54.9	860
Mölndal	91.0	17.2	32,884	41.5	20.3	21.7	8.2	6.3	1.6	0.5	15,703	16,502	47.8	50.2	799
Orust	88.4	4.4	8,403	35.3	20.6	19.0	19.7	3.4	1.8	0.1	3,251	4,988	38.7	59.4	1,737
Partille	91.4	10.0	19,162	37.1	24.1	23.7	6.6	6.2	1.5	0.8	8,299	10,421	43.3	54.4	2,122
Sotenäs	89.4	3.3	6,393	45.7	19.2	18.5	11.9	3.3	1.3	0.1	3,132	3,171	49.0	49.6	39
Stenungsund	89.0	5.6	10,608	43.0	17.3	16.7	18.0	2.4	2.4	0.1	4,578	5,850	45.5	52.0	1,272
Strömstad	85.7	3.3	6,259	39.3	22.6	18.9	13.6	3.9	1.6	0.1	2,846	3,255	43.2	55.1	409
Tanum	87.1	4.0	7,596	27.8	21.4	18.9	27.3	1.9	2.5	0.1	2,256	5,140	29.7	67.7	2,884
Tjörn	89.3	4.2	8,106	26.8	26.9	26.3	15.8	2.3	1.8	0.2	2,359	5,589	29.1	68.9	3,230
Uddevalla	89.2	16.4	31,383	47.7	17.6	15.3	12.6	4.6	1.8	0.4	16,415	14,268	52.3	45.5	2,147
Öckerö	90.3	3.5	6,615	30.8	26.5	22.7	15.9	2.5	1.3	0.3	2,201	4,311	33.3	65.2	2,110
Total	90.0	3.4	191,126	40.3	20.8	19.6	12.7	4.5	1.7	0.3	85,628	101,570	44.8	53.1	15,942
Source: SCB

==== Gothenburg ====
Location	Turnout	Share	Votes	S	M	FP	C	VPK	MP	Other	L-vote	R-vote	Left	Right	Margin
Location		%			%	%	%	%	%	%			%	%	
Gothenburg	88.6	100.0	282,569	40.1	22.1	20.4	5.0	9.2	1.8	1.3	139,283	134,297	49.3	47.5	4,986
Total	88.6	5.1	282,569	40.1	22.1	20.4	5.0	9.2	1.8	1.3	139,283	134,297	49.3	47.5	4,986
Source: SCB

==== Skaraborg ====
Location	Turnout	Share	Votes	S	M	FP	C	VPK	MP	Other	L-vote	R-vote	Left	Right	Margin
Location		%			%	%	%	%	%	%			%	%	
Essunga	90.5	2.2	3,934	25.1	27.4	13.2	31.8	1.7	0.7	0.1	1,054	2,851	26.8	72.5	1,797
Falköping	90.4	12.1	21,975	36.0	21.0	13.1	25.5	3.1	1.2	0.1	8,586	13,091	39.1	59.6	4,505
Grästorp	89.8	2.2	3,936	27.6	23.5	16.0	29.6	1.9	1.2	0.1	1,164	2,721	29.6	69.1	1,557
Gullspång	90.4	2.4	4,398	44.3	18.4	10.6	21.6	3.7	1.3	0.2	2,110	2,223	48.0	50.5	113
Götene	91.1	4.7	8,577	40.7	18.3	16.2	20.5	2.9	1.2	0.2	3,741	4,717	43.6	55.0	976
Habo	92.3	3.0	5,382	34.4	22.8	16.2	23.3	1.9	1.1	0.3	1,951	3,353	36.3	62.3	1,402
Hjo	90.9	3.3	5,994	39.7	23.6	13.7	18.9	2.7	1.2	0.1	2,545	3,370	42.5	56.2	825
Karlsborg	92.1	3.1	5,646	47.0	17.7	15.1	16.5	2.4	1.3	0.0	2,787	2,785	49.4	49.3	2
Lidköping	89.5	13.2	23,909	43.7	18.4	15.1	16.6	4.8	1.3	0.2	11,573	11,992	48.4	50.2	419
Mariestad	89.4	9.0	16,222	44.8	20.6	13.5	15.0	3.8	2.2	0.2	7,887	7,951	48.6	49.0	64
Mullsjö	92.8	2.4	4,272	34.9	20.2	15.7	24.9	2.2	1.8	0.2	1,587	2,601	37.1	60.9	1,014
Skara	90.4	6.7	12,203	40.5	21.0	15.2	17.2	3.3	1.9	0.9	5,341	6,523	43.8	53.5	1,182
Skövde	89.7	16.7	30,232	43.2	20.4	15.8	15.0	4.1	1.4	0.1	14,297	15,483	47.3	51.2	1,186
Tibro	91.0	4.0	7,307	43.6	16.4	17.8	18.0	3.0	1.0	0.1	3,410	3,817	46.7	52.2	407
Tidaholm	91.4	5.0	9,039	49.0	15.9	11.6	18.9	3.4	1.1	0.1	4,736	4,191	52.4	46.4	545
Töreboda	88.0	3.7	6,778	38.5	19.4	10.7	27.1	2.8	1.4	0.1	2,798	3,880	41.3	57.2	1,082
Vara	89.4	6.3	11,441	28.0	27.4	13.1	29.2	1.5	0.8	0.1	3,367	7,967	29.4	69.6	4,600
Total	90.1	3.3	181,245	40.2	20.4	14.4	20.1	3.3	1.3	0.2	78,934	99,516	43.6	54.9	20,582
Source: SCB

==== Älvsborg N ====
Location	Turnout	Share	Votes	S	M	FP	C	VPK	MP	Other	L-vote	R-vote	Left	Right	Margin
Location		%			%	%	%	%	%	%			%	%	
Ale	91.9	8.8	14,532	47.8	15.9	15.6	14.0	5.3	1.3	0.1	7,722	6,604	53.1	45.4	1,118
Alingsås	91.8	12.8	21,078	38.7	19.3	21.0	14.4	5.0	1.5	0.2	9,209	11,524	43.7	54.7	2,315
Bengtsfors	89.6	5.0	8,167	45.1	14.6	12.3	23.7	2.8	1.4	0.2	3,912	4,127	47.9	50.5	215
Dals-Ed	86.6	2.1	3,413	28.4	17.2	14.0	36.2	2.1	1.9	0.2	1,042	2,299	30.5	67.4	1,257
Färgelanda	89.7	3.0	4,865	37.7	16.3	11.3	31.4	1.8	1.4	0.1	1,923	2,867	39.5	58.9	944
Herrljunga	92.4	3.9	6,405	29.7	20.4	15.8	29.9	2.7	1.2	0.2	2,076	4,240	32.4	66.2	2,164
Lerum	92.9	11.9	19,615	33.6	25.1	24.9	9.4	4.6	2.1	0.3	7,485	11,655	38.2	59.4	4,170
Lilla Edet	89.6	4.5	7,436	50.8	13.9	12.1	16.3	4.9	1.7	0.2	4,149	3,142	55.8	42.3	1,007
Mellerud	89.2	4.4	7,175	33.9	20.3	11.2	30.6	2.3	1.6	0.1	2,595	4,456	36.2	62.1	1,861
Trollhättan	89.6	19.6	32,323	53.7	15.7	14.2	9.6	4.9	1.7	0.1	18,968	12,758	58.7	39.5	6,210
Vårgårda	92.0	3.8	6,273	27.6	19.9	18.7	29.6	2.2	1.8	0.1	1,870	4,280	29.8	68.2	2,410
Vänersborg	89.9	14.8	24,336	43.5	19.0	16.0	15.4	4.4	1.4	0.3	11,670	12,268	48.0	50.4	598
Åmål	87.8	5.5	9,104	47.0	18.8	13.2	16.8	3.2	1.1	0.1	4,568	4,433	50.2	48.7	135
Total	90.5	3.0	164,722	42.7	18.4	16.5	16.5	4.2	1.6	0.2	77,189	84,653	46.9	51.4	7,464
Source: SCB

==== Älvsborg S ====
Location	Turnout	Share	Votes	S	M	FP	C	VPK	MP	Other	L-vote	R-vote	Left	Right	Margin
Location		%			%	%	%	%	%	%			%	%	
Borås	91.1	56.5	67,899	44.3	22.8	15.3	11.8	4.5	1.0	0.4	33,083	33,875	48.7	49.9	792
Mark	92.2	17.9	21,458	46.1	18.4	10.5	20.0	3.8	1.1	0.1	10,711	10,483	49.9	48.9	228
Svenljunga	91.2	6.1	7,329	33.1	23.6	13.1	26.6	2.0	1.5	0.2	2,572	4,633	35.1	63.2	2,061
Tranemo	92.6	6.8	8,161	40.2	19.0	12.2	25.7	1.9	0.9	0.1	3,436	4,639	42.1	56.8	1,203
Ulricehamn	91.9	12.7	15,229	31.5	22.6	14.8	27.1	2.2	1.6	0.2	5,131	9,822	33.7	64.5	4,691
Total	91.5	2.2	120,076	42.0	21.8	14.0	17.1	3.7	1.1	0.3	54,933	63,452	45.7	52.8	8,519
Source: SCB

=== Örebro ===
Location	Turnout	Share	Votes	S	M	FP	C	VPK	MP	Other	L-vote	R-vote	Left	Right	Margin
Location		%			%	%	%	%	%	%			%	%	
Askersund	89.6	4.3	7,936	50.6	14.6	10.8	19.9	3.0	0.9	0.1	4,253	3,598	53.6	45.3	655
Degerfors	93.4	4.5	8,225	64.2	9.0	8.0	10.1	7.4	1.2	0.1	5,891	2,227	71.6	27.1	3,664
Hallsberg	91.1	6.1	11,308	54.5	12.2	11.0	16.1	4.6	1.3	0.2	6,692	4,448	59.2	39.3	2,244
Hällefors	88.9	3.6	6,712	66.4	9.6	7.8	7.2	7.4	1.4	0.1	4,955	1,656	73.8	24.7	3,299
Karlskoga	91.1	13.3	24,487	56.7	16.8	12.5	6.9	6.1	1.0	0.1	15,357	8,857	62.7	36.2	6,500
Kumla	91.0	6.5	12,030	51.8	12.9	12.7	16.2	4.8	1.2	0.3	6,820	5,030	56.7	41.8	1,790
Laxå	90.0	2.9	5,358	55.7	10.7	10.9	15.9	5.2	1.3	0.2	3,265	2,012	60.9	37.6	1,253
Lindesberg	89.7	9.0	16,559	49.0	15.0	10.3	18.3	4.5	2.5	0.3	8,867	7,220	53.5	43.6	1,647
Ljusnarsberg	87.5	2.5	4,520	57.7	11.1	8.7	12.4	8.7	1.4	0.1	2,999	1,452	66.3	32.1	1,547
Nora	89.3	3.6	6,594	51.7	15.8	13.6	12.3	4.4	2.1	0.1	3,699	2,751	56.1	41.7	948
Örebro	89.6	43.6	80,290	44.8	18.0	16.8	11.9	5.4	1.8	1.4	40,299	37,426	50.2	46.6	2,873
Total	90.1	3.3	184,019	50.6	15.5	13.5	12.6	5.4	1.6	0.7	103,097	76,677	56.0	41.7	26,420
Source: SCB

=== Östergötland ===
Location	Turnout	Share	Votes	S	M	FP	C	VPK	MP	Other	L-vote	R-vote	Left	Right	Margin
Location		%			%	%	%	%	%	%			%	%	
Boxholm	91.9	1.5	3,976	55.7	10.3	7.9	19.9	5.4	0.6	0.2	2,429	1,515	61.1	38.1	914
Finspång	92.2	6.0	16,001	58.2	13.6	9.6	12.5	4.6	1.4	0.1	10,042	5,719	62.8	35.7	4,323
Kinda	90.5	2.6	6,939	36.3	18.7	10.5	31.0	2.2	1.2	0.1	2,674	4,175	38.5	60.2	1,501
Linköping	91.3	30.2	80,501	42.8	23.5	15.4	11.1	5.0	1.5	0.8	38,448	40,237	47.8	50.0	1,789
Mjölby	90.1	6.5	17,227	49.1	17.8	11.3	17.0	3.6	1.0	0.2	9,079	7,946	52.7	46.1	1,133
Motala	90.5	10.4	27,696	53.9	15.7	13.3	11.2	4.6	1.1	0.1	16,209	11,146	58.5	40.2	5,063
Norrköping	89.2	29.6	79,081	49.7	22.9	12.5	8.7	4.7	1.3	0.1	43,048	34,929	54.4	44.2	8,119
Söderköping	90.4	3.0	7,978	36.4	23.5	11.8	23.7	2.5	2.1	0.0	3,103	4,703	38.9	58.9	1,600
Vadstena	91.9	2.0	5,218	45.9	20.5	13.0	16.2	2.8	1.3	0.3	2,541	2,591	48.7	49.7	50
Valdemarsvik	91.7	2.3	6,047	48.0	17.7	8.7	21.2	3.4	0.9	0.2	3,110	2,874	51.4	47.5	236
Ydre	91.8	1.1	3,024	29.2	17.6	15.1	35.1	1.7	1.4	0.0	933	2,049	30.9	67.8	1,116
Åtvidaberg	91.8	3.3	8,768	54.2	15.1	9.7	17.0	2.7	1.2	0.1	4,986	3,665	56.9	41.8	1,321
Ödeshög	91.1	1.5	4,103	40.4	17.8	9.9	28.1	2.6	1.0	0.2	1,765	2,288	43.0	55.8	523
Total	90.6	4.8	266,559	47.5	20.6	12.9	13.0	4.4	1.3	0.3	138,367	123,837	51.9	46.5	14,530
Source: SCB
