= Results of the 1964 Swedish general election =

Sweden held a general election on 20 September 1964.

== Results ==
Party	Votes	%	Seats	+/–
Swedish Social Democratic Party	2,006,923	47.27	113	–1
People's Party	720,733	16.98	43	+3
Right Party	582,609	13.72	33	–6
Centre Party	559,632	13.18	35	+1
Communist Party	221,746	5.22	8	+3
Christian Democratic Unity	75,389	1.78	0	New
Civic Unity (Note: Joint list of the three right-wing parties in Malmö. One of its elected candidates was a member of the Centre Party, but sat as an independent.)	64,807	1.53	1	New
Middle Parties (Note: Joint list of the Centre Party and People's Party that contested some constituencies.)	13,557	0.32	0	New
Other parties	384	0.01	0	0
Total	4,245,780	100.00	233	+1
Valid votes	4,245,780	99.35		
Invalid/blank votes	27,815	0.65		
Total votes	4,273,595	100.00		
Registered voters/turnout	5,095,850	83.86		
Source: Nohlen & Stöver

== Regional results ==
The results of the various constituency coalitions between the centre-right parties have all been listed under "C/F/H".

=== Percentage share ===
Location	Share	Votes	S	FP	H	C	K	C/F/H	KDS	Other	Left	Right
Götaland	48.2	2,046,192	45.2	16.4	14.3	15.0	3.7	3.8	1.5	0.0	48.9	49.6
Svealand	36.5	1,550,285	48.5	19.1	14.9	9.8	5.8	0.0	1.9	0.0	54.3	43.7
Norrland	15.3	649,303	50.8	13.8	9.1	15.5	8.6	0.0	2.3	0.0	59.4	38.4
Total	100.0	4,245,780	47.3	17.0	13.7	13.2	5.2	1.8	1.8	0.0	52.5	45.7
Source: SCB

=== By votes ===
Location	Share	Votes	S	FP	H	C	K	C/F/H	KDS	Other	Left	Right
Götaland	48.2	2,046,192	925,119	335,563	293,120	307,059	76,053	78,349	30,815	114	1,001,172	1,014,091
Svealand	36.5	1,550,285	751,982	295,739	230,434	151,964	89,990	15	29,962	199	841,972	678,152
Norrland	15.3	649,303	329,822	89,431	59,055	100,609	55,703		14,612	71	385,525	249,095
Total	100.0	4,245,780	2,006,923	720,733	582,609	559,632	221,746	78,364	75,389	384	2,228,669	1,941,338
Source: SCB

== Constituency results ==
The results of the various constituency coalitions between the centre-right parties have all been listed under "C/F/H".

=== Percentage share ===
Location	Land	Turnout	Share	Votes	S	FP	H	C	VPK	C/F/H	KDS	Other	Left	Right	Margin
Location		%	%		%	%	%	%	%	%	%	%	%	%	
Blekinge	G	81.9	1.9	81,038	50.6	18.5	13.1	13.2	4.6	0.0	0.1	0.0	55.2	44.8	8,416
Bohuslän	G	81.8	2.9	125,016	41.9	26.6	12.7	12.6	3.8	0.0	2.3	0.0	45.8	52.0	7,785
Gothenburg	G	83.4	5.5	233,560	41.2	33.5	11.8	2.0	10.0	0.0	1.4	0.0	51.2	47.3	9,158
Gotland	G	84.7	0.7	29,421	39.5	0.0	14.4	0.0	0.0	46.1	0.0	0.0	39.5	60.5	6,200
Gävleborg	N	80.2	3.7	158,797	52.5	14.2	7.7	15.5	9.9	0.0	0.1	0.0	62.5	37.4	39,770
Halland	G	84.3	2.3	98,968	40.6	14.0	14.4	28.5	2.5	0.0	0.0	0.0	43.1	56.9	13,659
Jämtland	N	81.9	1.7	73,542	51.7	13.2	12.6	19.0	3.5	0.0	0.0	0.0	55.2	44.8	7,616
Jönköping	G	85.8	3.9	165,247	41.6	17.8	13.9	19.2	2.9	0.0	4.7	0.0	44.5	50.8	10,427
Kalmar	G	83.5	3.1	132,152	46.2	10.5	18.4	21.4	0.0	3.6	0.0	0.0	49.7	50.2	620
Kopparberg	S	80.4	3.6	150,991	50.0	13.9	8.4	19.3	5.7	0.0	2.7	0.0	55.7	41.6	21,268
Kristianstad	G	83.2	3.4	144,781	44.8	16.1	18.0	19.6	1.4	0.0	0.1	0.0	46.3	53.7	10,765
Kronoberg	G	83.7	2.1	91,116	40.2	9.8	19.8	25.7	4.1	0.0	0.5	0.0	44.3	55.2	9,943
Malmö area	G	87.7	5.5	232,797	53.9	5.8	7.6	2.3	2.6	27.8	0.0	0.0	56.5	43.5	30,277
Malmöhus	G	87.1	3.5	148,729	50.0	13.0	14.1	22.3	0.5	0.0	0.0	0.0	50.6	49.4	1,677
Norrbotten	N	82.1	3.1	131,819	51.8	9.3	9.8	10.4	16.0	0.0	2.9	0.0	67.7	29.4	50,470
Skaraborg	G	83.3	3.3	140,874	37.4	16.9	15.6	23.8	2.8	0.0	3.5	0.0	40.2	56.3	22,803
Stockholm	S	82.6	10.8	457,202	43.7	24.1	20.0	3.0	7.3	0.0	1.7	0.0	51.0	47.2	17,681
Stockholm County	S	84.8	6.5	277,476	45.0	21.1	18.6	8.0	5.4	0.0	1.9	0.0	50.4	47.7	7,568
Södermanland	S	86.7	3.1	130,760	55.5	17.7	10.9	12.8	3.0	0.0	0.1	0.0	58.5	41.4	22,281
Uppsala	S	83.7	2.3	97,856	48.0	17.6	13.8	14.4	3.4	0.0	2.8	0.0	51.4	45.9	5,378
Värmland	S	83.3	3.9	163,878	52.1	12.9	12.9	13.4	6.7	0.0	2.1	0.0	58.8	39.1	32,188
Västerbotten	N	83.8	3.0	126,444	45.9	20.6	10.1	16.6	2.7	0.0	4.0	0.0	48.6	47.4	1,569
Västernorrland	N	85.0	3.7	158,701	51.7	11.9	7.4	17.2	8.2	0.0	3.6	0.0	59.9	36.6	37,005
Västmanland	S	83.8	2.9	124,707	55.6	14.9	9.4	12.5	5.4	0.0	2.1	0.0	61.0	36.9	30,086
Älvsborg N	G	83.0	2.7	113,893	43.4	20.4	11.6	17.9	3.5	0.0	3.1	0.0	46.9	50.0	3,463
Älvsborg S	G	87.4	2.4	101,636	42.3	14.1	23.7	16.4	3.5	0.0	0.0	0.0	45.7	54.3	8,658
Örebro	S	83.3	3.5	147,415	52.6	17.6	9.5	12.4	5.4	0.0	2.6	0.0	58.0	39.4	27,370
Östergötland	G	85.4	4.9	206,964	51.9	12.4	15.2	12.9	3.9	0.0	3.8	0.0	55.8	40.4	31,876
Total		83.9	100.0	4,245,780	47.3	17.0	13.7	13.2	5.2	1.8	1.8	0.0	52.5	45.7	287,331
Source: SCB

=== By votes ===
Location	Land	Turnout	Share	Votes	S	FP	H	C	VPK	C/F/H	KDS	Other	Left	Right	Margin
Location		%	%												
Blekinge	G	81.9	1.9	81,038	41,004	14,974	10,576	10,728	3,690		66		44,694	36,278	8,416
Bohuslän	G	81.8	2.9	125,016	52,409	33,315	15,865	15,803	4,789		2,830	5	57,198	64,983	7,785
Gothenburg	G	83.4	5.5	233,560	96,309	78,139	27,616	4,769	23,373		3,338	16	119,682	110,524	9,158
Gotland	G	84.7	0.7	29,421	11,610	2	4,251			13,557		1	11,610	17,810	6,200
Gävleborg	N	80.2	3.7	158,797	83,405	22,542	12,282	24,607	15,796		135	30	99,201	59,431	39,770
Halland	G	84.3	2.3	98,968	40,187	13,866	14,203	28,232	2,455		19	6	42,642	56,301	13,659
Jämtland	N	81.9	1.7	73,542	38,038	9,673	9,295	13,994	2,540			2	40,578	32,962	7,616
Jönköping	G	85.8	3.9	165,247	68,767	29,349	22,916	31,704	4,776	1	7,728	6	73,543	83,970	10,427
Kalmar	G	83.5	3.1	132,152	61,040	13,827	24,264	28,270	4,701		42	8	65,741	66,361	620
Kopparberg	S	80.4	3.6	150,991	75,437	20,967	12,691	29,190	8,679		4,023	4	84,116	62,848	21,268
Kristianstad	G	83.2	3.4	144,781	64,922	23,324	26,013	28,387	2,042	5	75	13	66,964	77,729	10,765
Kronoberg	G	83.7	2.1	91,116	36,656	8,919	18,001	23,391	3,712		433	4	40,368	50,311	9,943
Malmö area	G	87.7	5.5	232,797	125,369	13,394	17,687	5,382	6,153	64,782	8	22	131,522	101,245	30,277
Malmöhus	G	87.1	3.5	148,729	74,385	19,408	20,965	33,149	814		2	6	75,199	73,522	1,677
Norrbotten	N	82.1	3.1	131,819	68,226	12,228	12,860	13,695	21,027		3,761	22	89,253	38,783	50,470
Skaraborg	G	83.3	3.3	140,874	52,649	23,822	22,033	33,511	3,915	1	4,939	4	56,564	79,367	22,803
Stockholm	S	82.6	10.8	457,202	199,912	110,190	91,575	13,930	33,477	13	7,975	130	233,389	215,708	17,681
Stockholm County	S	84.8	6.5	277,476	124,872	58,565	51,595	22,150	15,008	2	5,257	27	139,880	132,312	7,568
Södermanland	S	86.7	3.1	130,760	72,542	23,201	14,209	16,781	3,930		91	6	76,472	54,191	22,281
Uppsala	S	83.7	2.3	97,856	46,974	17,226	13,546	14,111	3,287		2,711	1	50,261	44,883	5,378
Värmland	S	83.3	3.9	163,878	85,351	21,102	21,098	21,927	10,964		3,424	12	96,315	64,127	32,188
Västerbotten	N	83.8	3.0	126,444	58,075	26,110	12,827	20,964	3,395		5,065	8	61,470	59,901	1,569
Västernorrland	N	85.0	3.7	158,701	82,078	18,878	11,791	27,349	12,945		5,651	9	95,023	58,018	37,005
Västmanland	S	83.8	2.9	124,707	69,383	18,610	11,741	15,645	6,699		2,629		76,082	45,996	30,086
Älvsborg N	G	83.0	2.7	113,893	49,450	23,254	13,241	20,411	3,994	1	3,542		53,444	56,907	3,463
Älvsborg S	G	87.4	2.4	101,636	42,979	14,366	24,109	16,669	3,507			6	46,486	55,144	8,658
Örebro	S	83.3	3.5	147,415	77,511	25,878	13,979	18,230	7,946		3,852	19	85,457	58,087	27,370
Östergötland	G	85.4	4.9	206,964	107,383	25,604	31,380	26,653	8,132	2	7,793	17	115,515	83,639	31,876
Total		83.9	100.0	4,245,780	2,006,923	720,733	582,609	559,632	221,746	78,364	75,389	384	2,228,669	1,941,338	287,331
Source: SCB
