= Tylöskog =

Forest in Sweden

Coordinates: 58.8963°N 15.3177°E

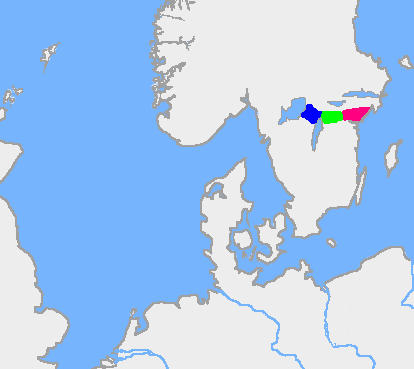
Ancient border forests between Swedes and Geats. Tylöskog is in the centre in green, Tiveden in blue, and Kolmården in red.

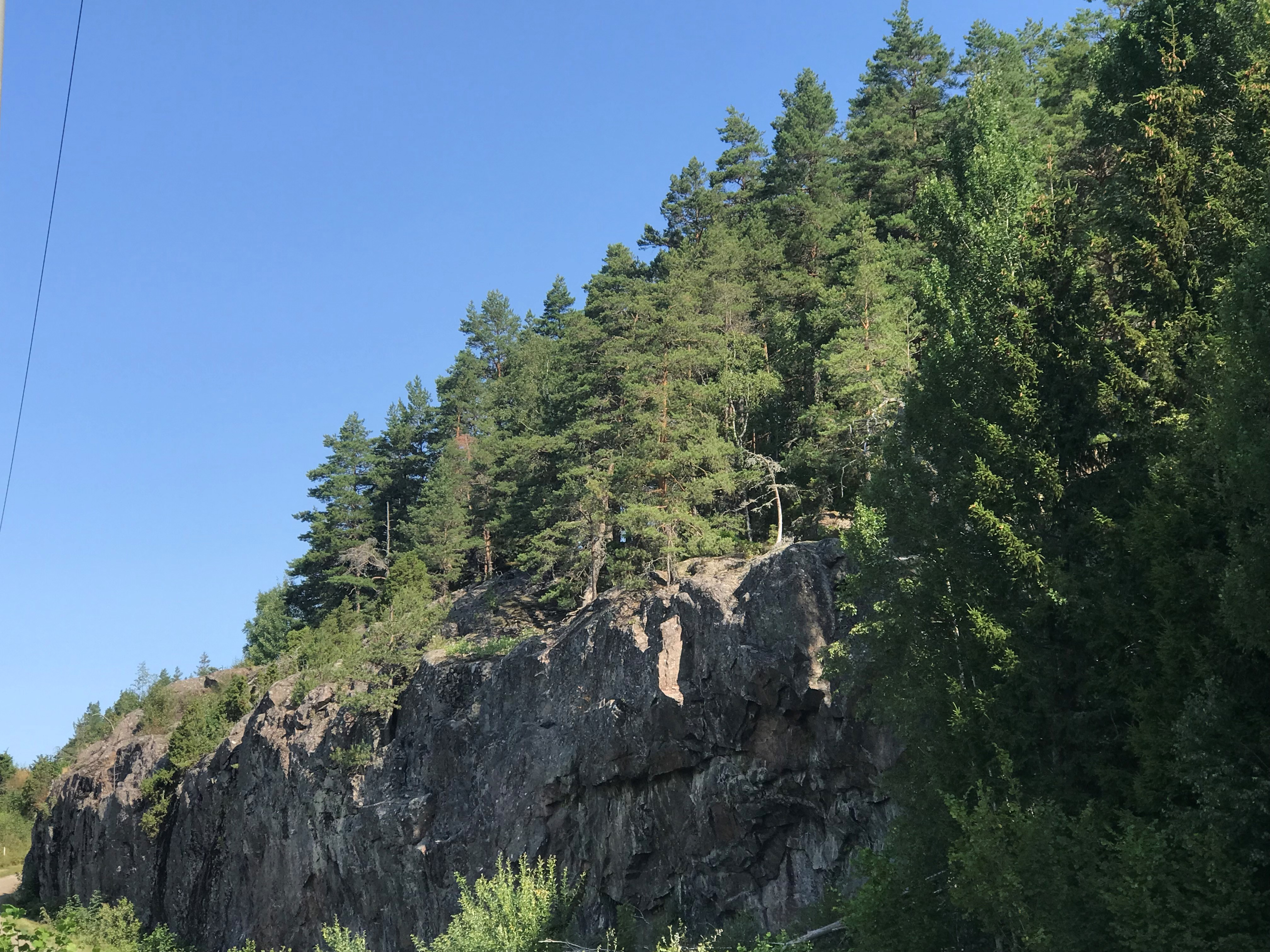
One of the faults that intersect the forest, near Åmmeberg.

Tylöskog is a forested area in southeast Sweden, intersected by many faults, running from east to west between the agricultural plains of the counties of Närke and Östergötland. Together with Tiveden to its west and Kolmården to its east, it constituted the border between the Swedes in Svealand and the Geats in Götaland. Beginning in the 11th century, iron was smelted there using water power.
