= Kolmården =

Forest in Sweden

Coordinates: 58.6653°N 16.4664°E

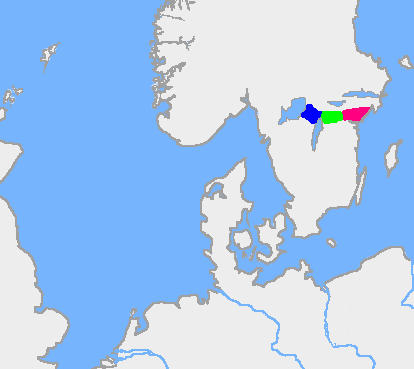
Map of old border forests between Swedes and Geats. Kolmården is red, Tylöskog is green, and Tiveden is blue

Kolmården is a long and wide densely forested rocky ridge that separates the Swedish provinces of Södermanland and Östergötland, two of the country's main agricultural areas, from each other, and in historic times, along with Tylöskog and Tiveden, formed the border between the land of the Swedes and the land of the Geats.

== History ==
In early medieval times it was seen as a major obstacle in land travel between the regions, and so the Baltic Sea was largely used instead. Together with the extensive forests of Tiveden and Tylöskog to its west, Kolmården formed a major impediment for travel between the Swedes in Svealand to the north and the Geats in Götaland, which caused peaceful and warlike interaction to be conducted by water.

In the Icelandic text Sögubrot af nokkrum fornkonungum, Kolmården between Svealand and Östergötland is described as the border between Sweden and Östergötland (..Kolmerkr, er skilr Svíþjóð ok Eystra-Gautland). It also appears as Mirkwood in some editions of Sögubrot, in the legend of Helgi Hundingsbane and probably also in Völundarkviða.

== Geography ==
The forest is divided between Norrköping Municipality and Nyköping Municipality on either side of the regional border. The Östergötland side has the majority of the population, centred in the village of Krokek. Settlements Strömsfors and Kvarsebo are also included on that side of the border. The Södermanland side has the small settlements of Kila, Stavsjö and Ålberga in Nyköping's Kila district named after river Kilaån that flows through Kolmården towards the Baltic Sea.

Today the forest is traversed by the Norrköping–Nyköping railway, the Norrköping–Katrineholm railway, and the E4 highway, all connecting southern Sweden with Stockholm and the Mälaren region. Along the former there is also a Kolmården railway station, at Krokek next to Bråviken.

== Climate ==
Kolmården has a climate that is a hybrid between maritime and continental with some differences between lower, coastal parts, and the higher forested hills. The Kolmården weather station is located at 159 metres (522 ft) above sea level and therefore has some orographic lift, resulting in increased rainfall for the region. Its position in a hill lowers daytime highs compared to the municipal seat of Norrköping, while lows remain similar to the lower elevation. The elevated nature Kolmården has an effect on rainfall east of it, splitting many fronts in two, creating a micro version of a rain shadow. As a result, the climates right on the coastline of Oxelösund and Nyköping become drier than the waterfront next to the Kolmården hills.

Climate data for Kolmården-Strömsfors (2002–2018 averages, extremes since 2002)
| Month | Jan | Feb | Mar | Apr | May | Jun | Jul | Aug | Sep | Oct | Nov | Dec | Year |
|---|---|---|---|---|---|---|---|---|---|---|---|---|---|
| Record high °C (°F) | 10.8 (51.4) | 12.0 (53.6) | 18.2 (64.8) | 23.7 (74.7) | 28.8 (83.8) | 32.4 (90.3) | 32.9 (91.2) | 32.9 (91.2) | 24.4 (75.9) | 20.5 (68.9) | 13.8 (56.8) | 11.9 (53.4) | 32.9 (91.2) |
| Mean maximum °C (°F) | 6.1 (43.0) | 6.7 (44.1) | 12.9 (55.2) | 19.1 (66.4) | 24.4 (75.9) | 28.2 (82.8) | 29.4 (84.9) | 28.0 (82.4) | 22.6 (72.7) | 16.0 (60.8) | 10.6 (51.1) | 7.1 (44.8) | 30.3 (86.5) |
| Mean daily maximum °C (°F) | −0.4 (31.3) | 0.2 (32.4) | 4.7 (40.5) | 11.0 (51.8) | 16.8 (62.2) | 20.4 (68.7) | 23.2 (73.8) | 21.4 (70.5) | 16.9 (62.4) | 9.7 (49.5) | 4.5 (40.1) | 1.5 (34.7) | 10.8 (51.5) |
| Daily mean °C (°F) | −2.5 (27.5) | −2.2 (28.0) | 1.2 (34.2) | 6.3 (43.3) | 11.7 (53.1) | 15.4 (59.7) | 18.4 (65.1) | 17.0 (62.6) | 13.0 (55.4) | 6.9 (44.4) | 2.6 (36.7) | −0.5 (31.1) | 7.3 (45.1) |
| Mean daily minimum °C (°F) | −4.6 (23.7) | −4.5 (23.9) | −2.3 (27.9) | 1.6 (34.9) | 6.5 (43.7) | 10.4 (50.7) | 13.5 (56.3) | 12.6 (54.7) | 9.0 (48.2) | 4.1 (39.4) | 0.7 (33.3) | −2.4 (27.7) | 3.7 (38.7) |
| Mean minimum °C (°F) | −13.3 (8.1) | −12.3 (9.9) | −8.8 (16.2) | −3.9 (25.0) | 0.9 (33.6) | 5.1 (41.2) | 9.1 (48.4) | 7.9 (46.2) | 3.1 (37.6) | −2.0 (28.4) | −6.1 (21.0) | −10.1 (13.8) | −15.7 (3.7) |
| Record low °C (°F) | −19.7 (−3.5) | −21.3 (−6.3) | −15.1 (4.8) | −7.4 (18.7) | −2.5 (27.5) | 1.5 (34.7) | 6.2 (43.2) | 4.5 (40.1) | −0.1 (31.8) | −5.1 (22.8) | −13.3 (8.1) | −20.2 (−4.4) | −21.3 (−6.3) |
| Average precipitation mm (inches) | 50.3 (1.98) | 41.1 (1.62) | 34.3 (1.35) | 34.7 (1.37) | 47.9 (1.89) | 73.7 (2.90) | 71.6 (2.82) | 85.3 (3.36) | 43.1 (1.70) | 65.5 (2.58) | 62.5 (2.46) | 52.6 (2.07) | 662.6 (26.1) |
Source 1: SMHI Open Data for Kolmården-Strömsfors A, precipitation
Source 2: SMHI Open Data for Kolmården-Strömsfors A, temperature

== Kolmården Wildlife Park ==
The Kolmården Wildlife Park, opened in 1965, overlooks Bråviken bay. This zoo includes the only dolphinarium in Sweden.

== See also ==
- Tiveden
- Tylöskog
