= Svealand =

Historical core region of Sweden

Svealand Swealand
- Land of Sweden
- Coordinates: 60°52′N 14°44′E
- Largest city: Stockholm

Area
  - Total: 91,098 km^{2} (35,173 sq mi)

Population (31 December 2021)
  - Total: 4,268,504
- Time zone: UTC+1 (CET)
  - Summer (DST): UTC+2 (CEST)

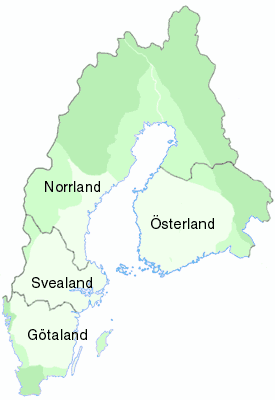
The historical four divisions of Swedish territory.

Svealand (Swedish: [ˈsvêːaˌland]), or Swealand, is the historical core region of Sweden. It is located in south-central Sweden and is one of the three historical lands of Sweden, bounded to the north by Norrland and to the south by Götaland. Deep forests, Tiveden, Tylöskog, and Kolmården, separated Svealand from Götaland. Historically, its inhabitants were called Svear, from which is derived the English 'Swedes'.

Svealand consists of the capital region Mälardalen in the east, Roslagen in the north-east, the former mining district Bergslagen in the center, and Dalarna and Värmland in the west. It includes an extensive archipelago of thousands of small islands in Södermanland and Uppland and has lakeshores on the four largest lakes in the country. In the interior, there are several ski resorts in the southern parts of the Scandinavian Mountains. Two large rivers run through Svealand. Klarälven originates in Norway and enters lake Vänern through Värmland, whereas Dalälven runs from Dalarna through the lake of Siljan. The other major river basins in Svealand are Norrström that runs up in Bergslagen through lakes Hjälmaren and Mälaren, along with Nyköpingsån that covers the post-glacial lake district of Södermanland. Svealand generally has a moderate continental climate with a gradual decline of precipitation and increase of temperatures moving eastwards as the elevation descends.

Stockholm, the capital and largest city in Sweden, is Svealand's primate city and historical urban centre. The other administrative capitals are Falun, Karlstad, Nyköping, Uppsala, Västerås and Örebro.

The older name of Sweden in Swedish, Svea rike (modern spelling: Sverige) Realm of the Swedes, "Swea Region", originally only referred to Svealand. Other forms are Sweoðeod (Old Norse/Icelandic Svíþjóð), and Sweorice. As the domains of the Swedish kings grew, the name Svealand began to be used to separate the original territory from the new.

== Provinces ==
Svealand is made up of the following six provinces:

- Dalarna
- Närke
- Södermanland
- Uppland
- Värmland
- Västmanland

Stockholm, the Swedish capital, is located in both Uppland and Södermanland, and a border stone can be found in the street Västerlånggatan in Stockholm Old Town (Gamla stan).

== Counties ==
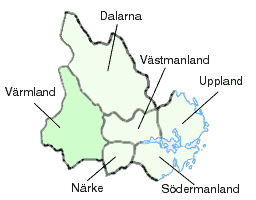
Svealand. Värmland was counted to Götaland until the 19th century, which is indicated on the map by a darker shade.

Since 1634, Sweden has been divided into counties instead of provinces (see Län). Although Svealand is defined in terms of the historical provinces and not the counties, it roughly comprises the modern counties of Dalarna, Örebro, Södermanland, Stockholm, Uppsala, Värmland and Västmanland.

== History ==
Svealand was the original Sweden, to which it gave its name. This is supported by linguistics and is based on early medieval sources, such as the sagas. In Old Norse and in Old English, Svealand and Sweden are synonymous, and described as a separate country from Götaland. Svealand and Götaland were also divided by deep forests, which prevented both polities from being controlled effectively.

- In Sögubrot af Nokkrum for instance, Kolmården between Svealand and Östergötland is described as the border between Sweden and Östergötland (... Kolmerkr, er skilr Svíþjóð ok Eystra-Gautland ...).
- In Hervarar saga, king Ingold I rides to Sweden through Östergötland: Ingi konungr fór með hirð sína ok sveit nokkura ok hafði lítinn her. Hann reið austr um Smáland ok í eystra Gautland ok svá í Svíþjóð.
- Sweoland is mentioned in the travels of Ohthere of Hålogaland around 890.
- The lord Bo Jonsson Grip was probably the one who was best acquainted with the geography of the Swedish kingdom since he owned more than half of it. In 1384, he stated in his will that the kingdom consisted of Swerige (Sweden, i.e. Svealand), Österland (i.e. Finland) and Göthaland (i.e. Götaland).
- The 15th-century Swedish version of the Þiðrekssaga says that Vilkinaland was formerly a name for Sweden (Swerige) and Götaland: wilcina land som nw är kalladh swerige oc götaland.

In the Early Middle Ages, the modern province of Gästrikland was part of Tiundaland, one of the three constituent parts of the modern province of Uppland, and therefore counted as a part of Svealand.

For a time in the early 19th century, the province of Värmland belonged to the Court of Appeal for Svealand. Even though Värmland historically belonged to Götaland (from 1815 until a new court, Court of Appeal for Western Sweden, was instituted), it has by custom long been considered part of Svealand.

== See also ==
- Central Swedish lowland
- Norrland terrain
- Österland
- Rike
