= Götaland =

Region of Sweden

- Land of Sweden
- Coordinates: 57°39′N 14°41′E

Area
  - Total: 97,841 km^{2} (37,777 sq mi)

Population (31 December 2021)
  - Total: 4,995,764
  - Density: 51.060/km^{2} (132.24/sq mi)
- Time zone: UTC+1 (CET)
  - Summer (DST): UTC+2 (CEST)

Götaland (Swedish: [ˈjø̂ːtaˌland]; also Gothia, Gothland, Gothenland or Gautland) is one of three lands of Sweden and comprises ten provinces. Geographically it is located in the south of Sweden, bounded to the north by Svealand, with the deep woods of Tiveden, Tylöskog and Kolmården marking the border.

Götaland once consisted of petty kingdoms, and their inhabitants were called Gautar in Old Norse. However, Gautar mainly referred to the population of its western part, modern Västergötland. It is agreed that Gautar meant the same as Geats, the people of the hero Beowulf in England's national epic, Beowulf.

The modern state of Sweden began to form as some provinces of Götaland became more and more politically intertwined with those of Svealand. This process can be traced back at least to the 10th century, and it continued for several hundred years. Other parts of modern Götaland were at that time either Danish or Norwegian. The province of Småland, with the historically important city Kalmar on its coast, was sparsely populated, and the status of the Baltic island Gotland varied during the Middle Ages. Bohuslän first became Swedish during the 17th century after being taken from Norway, around the same time as Denmark lost Scania, Halland and Blekinge to Sweden.

== Etymology ==
Historical coat of arms of Götaland

The earliest possible mentions of the götar is by the 2nd-century geographer Ptolemy, who mentions the Goutai (Γούται in Greek). Later, the Anglo-Saxon epic Beowulf (8th–11th century) is partly set among the Gēatas. Norwegian and Icelandic sources sometimes use Gautar only for the people of Västergötland, but sometimes as a common ethnic term for the people of both Västergötland and Östergötland. Västergötland appears in medieval Icelandic and Norwegian sources as Gautland (Götland), a form which is not etymologically identical to Götaland.

The name Götaland replaced the old Götland in the 15th century, and it was probably to distinguish the wider region it denoted from the traditional heartland in Västergötland. The name Götaland probably originally referred only to Västergötland and Östergötland, but was later extended to adjoining districts. The name Götaland is possibly a plural construction and means the "lands of the Geats", where Göta- is the genitive plural of the ethnonym Göt (Geat). The interpretation that the neuter noun -land is a plural and not a singular noun is indicated by Bo Jonsson Grip's will in 1384, where he stated that he donated property in Swerige (Sweden, i.e. Svealand), Österlandom (Finland) and in Göthalandom to monasteries. Here Götaland appears in the plural form of the dative case.

For the etymology of the element Geat/Gaut/Göt and Goth, see Geat.

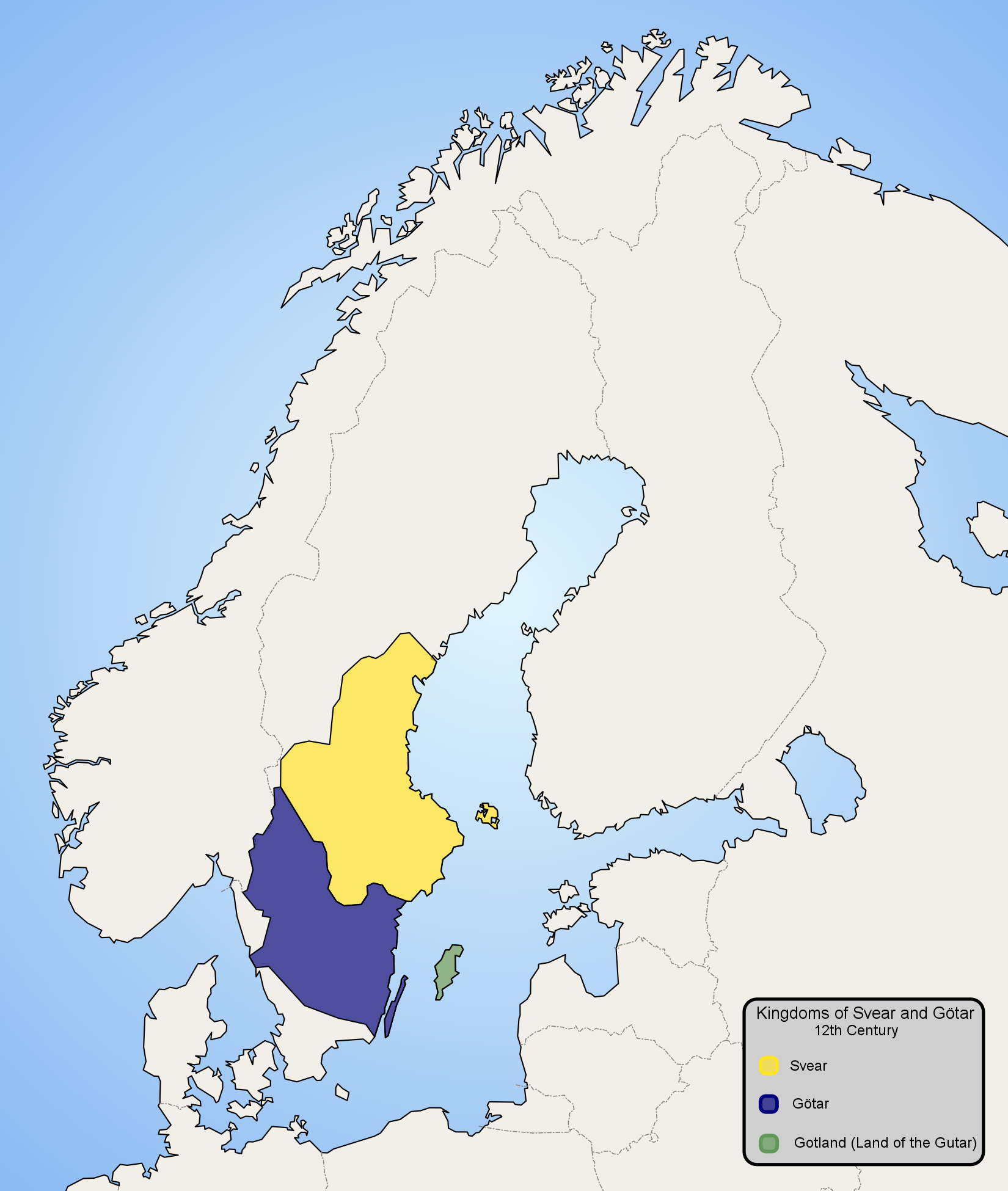
Map indicating that the areas of the Geats originally included Värmland as well

== History ==
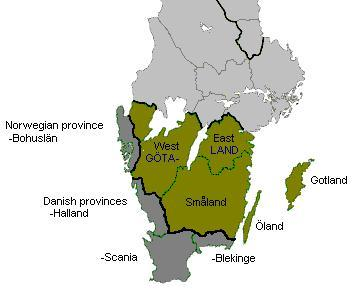
Map of historical Götaland, the areas of the Geats, which politically merged with the Swedes to form Sweden. Note that Värmland, north of Dalsland and Västergötland, also was a part of Götaland originally, while the large island of Gotland was not. Expansions in dark gray outside the border, including Gotland.

Västergötland and Östergötland, once rival kingdoms themselves, constitute Götaland proper. The Geatish kings, however, belong to the domain of Norse mythology. Both Västergötland and Östergötland have large agricultural areas where villages and towns were established in the past. The large river Göta Älv drains the third largest lake in Europe, Lake Vänern. At its mouth (where Gothenburg emerged during the earlier part of the 17th century) the population in Västergötland had access to the Kattegat sea. The Göta Älv estuary also formed the border between the Kingdoms of Norway and Denmark until the 13th century.

Geatland is the land in which the medieval hero of the poem Beowulf is said to have lived.

It was only late in the Middle Ages that Götaland began to be perceived as a part of Sweden. In Old Norse and in Old English sources, Gautland/Geatland is still treated as a separate country from Sweden. In Sögubrot af Nokkrum for instance, Kolmården between Svealand and Östergötland is described as the border between Sweden and Ostrogothia (...Kolmerkr, er skilr Svíþjóð ok Eystra-Gautland...), and in Hervarar saga, King Ingold I rides to Sweden through Östergötland: Ingi konungr fór með hirð sína ok sveit nokkura ok hafði lítinn her. Hann reið austr um Smáland ok í eystra Gautland ok svá í Svíþjóð. In 1384 Bo Jonsson (Grip) stated in his will that the kingdom consisted of Swerige (Sweden, i.e. Svealand), Österland (i.e. Finland) and Göthaland (i.e. Götaland, as of the 1384 borders).

The small countries to the south – Finnveden, Kind, Möre, Njudung, Tjust, Tveta, Värend, and Ydre – were merged into the province of Småland (literally: [the] "small lands"). Off the coast of Småland was the island of Öland, which became a separate province. Dal to the north west became the province of Dalsland.

Småland, Öland and Dalsland were already seen as lands belonging to Götaland during the Scandinavian Middle Ages (12th–15th century).

Småland was full of deep forests, especially in the south, and was of lesser importance to Götaland compared to the agricultural areas in Västergötland and Östergötland. On its Baltic Sea coast lay the important town of Kalmar, where in 1397 the Kalmar Union was proclaimed at Kalmar Castle, a personal union of the three countries of Sweden, Denmark and Norway under one ruler.

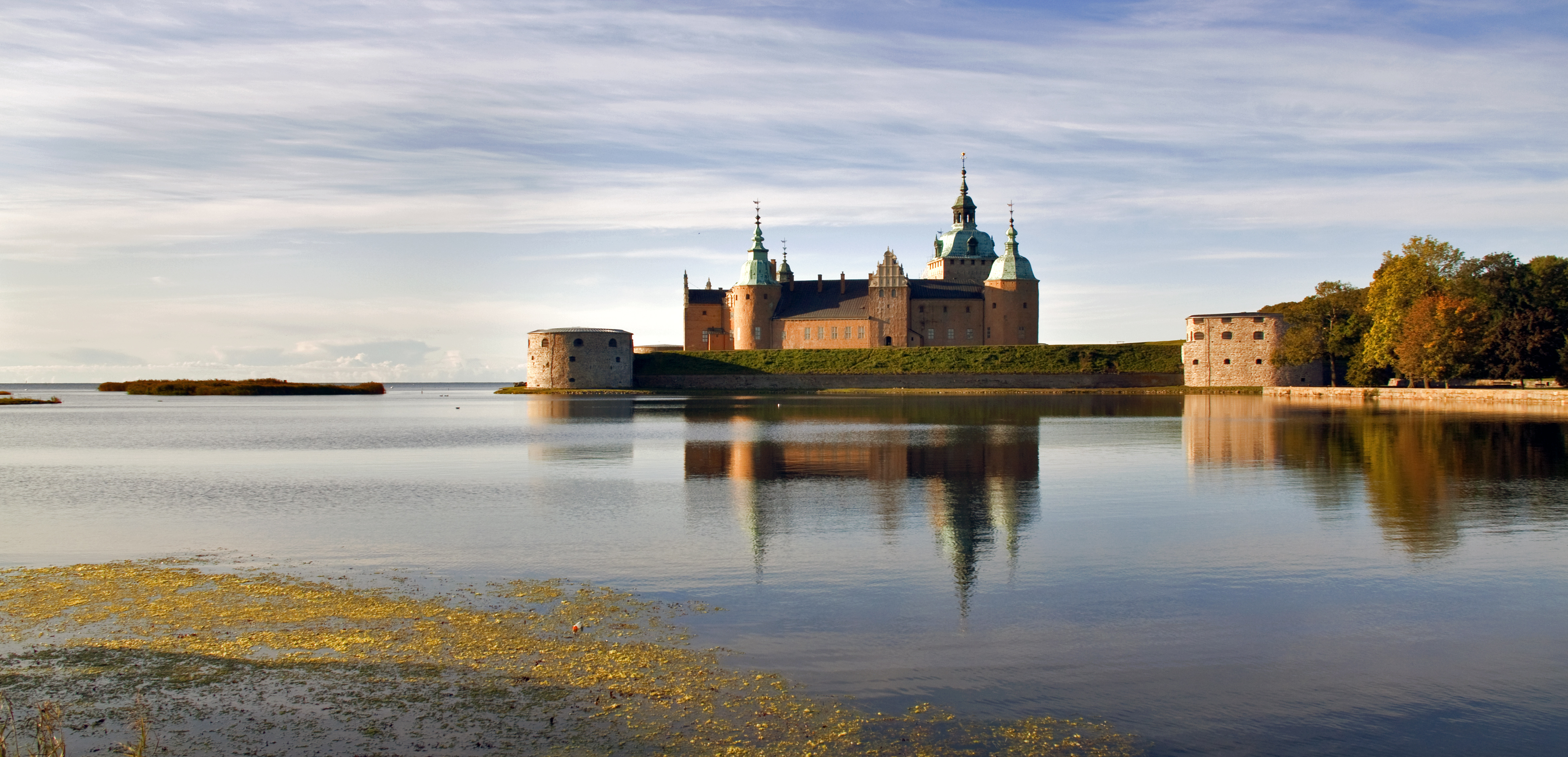
Kalmar Castle – view from the North-Eastern side

In the Treaty of Roskilde (1658), the kingdom of Denmark-Norway ceded the Danish provinces of Blekinge, Halland, Scania, and Norwegian province of Bohuslän to Sweden. These provinces are since then counted as parts of Götaland.

The island of Gotland shifted allegiance between the Swedes and the Danes several times. Although the island may be perceived to have closer links to Svealand, it is counted as part of Götaland.

Värmland originally belonged to the Göta Court of Appeal, but the province changed to become part of the Court of Appeal for Svealand for a period of time in the early 19th century.

== Provinces and counties ==
Today, Götaland has no administrative function and is thus an unofficial entity, but it is generally considered to be one of three Swedish lands or parts. It is made up of ten provinces, based loosely on the area originally under the jurisdiction of the Göta Court of Appeals (established in 1634), to which the Scanian lands, Gotland and Bohuslän were added in 1658–79:

- Blekinge
- Bohuslän
- Dalsland
- Gotland
- Halland
- Scania
- Småland
- Västergötland
- Öland
- Östergötland

Administratively, Sweden is not divided into provinces but into counties (see Län). Although Götaland is defined in terms of the historical provinces and not the counties, it roughly comprises the modern counties of Blekinge, Gotland, Halland, Jönköping, Kalmar, Kronoberg, Östergötland, Scania and Västra Götaland.

== Geography ==
Deep forests are found in the Småland province, there is plenty of farmland in Scania, and a little bit of both in Västergötland and Östergötland. Coasts are usually relatively flat and consist of archipelagoes as well as sandy beaches. The two largest islands of Sweden are included in Götaland. The two largest lakes of Sweden are also situated mainly in Götaland. The total area is 87,712 km^{2} with about 4.4 million inhabitants including the second and third largest urban areas of Sweden.

== Map gallery ==
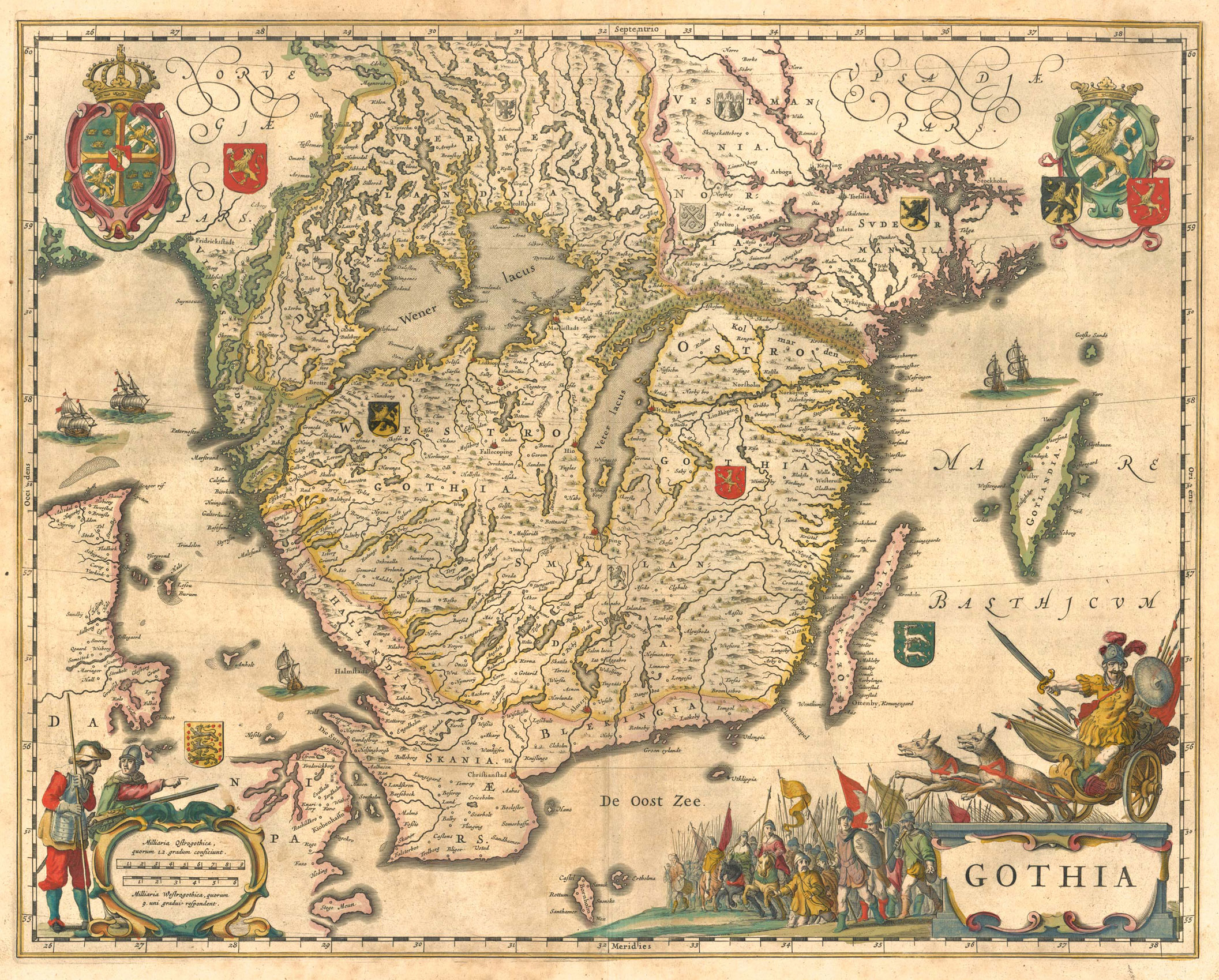
Gothia, Sweden, in 1635 (yellow outline), bordering Danish Scanian lands to the south and southwest (red outline), and Norway to the west (green outline). Note the inclusion of Värmland.

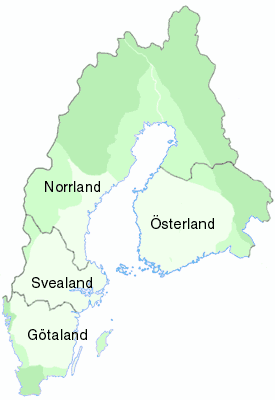
Map of Sweden's three historical lands, the former Swedish province Österland in Finland, and the former historical land of Denmark (Skåneland) in southern Sweden. In the map, the lands have their most recent borders.

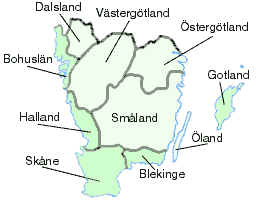
Götaland with the Swedish acquisitions of 1645 and 1658 in darker green: Gotland, Blekinge, Halland and Scania from Denmark, and Bohuslän from Norway (then under Danish rule)

== See also ==
- Gotland
- Götaland theory
- Göta highway
- Goths
- Norrland
- Österland
