= Tiveden =

Forest in Sweden

Tiveden forest
- Tivedsskogen
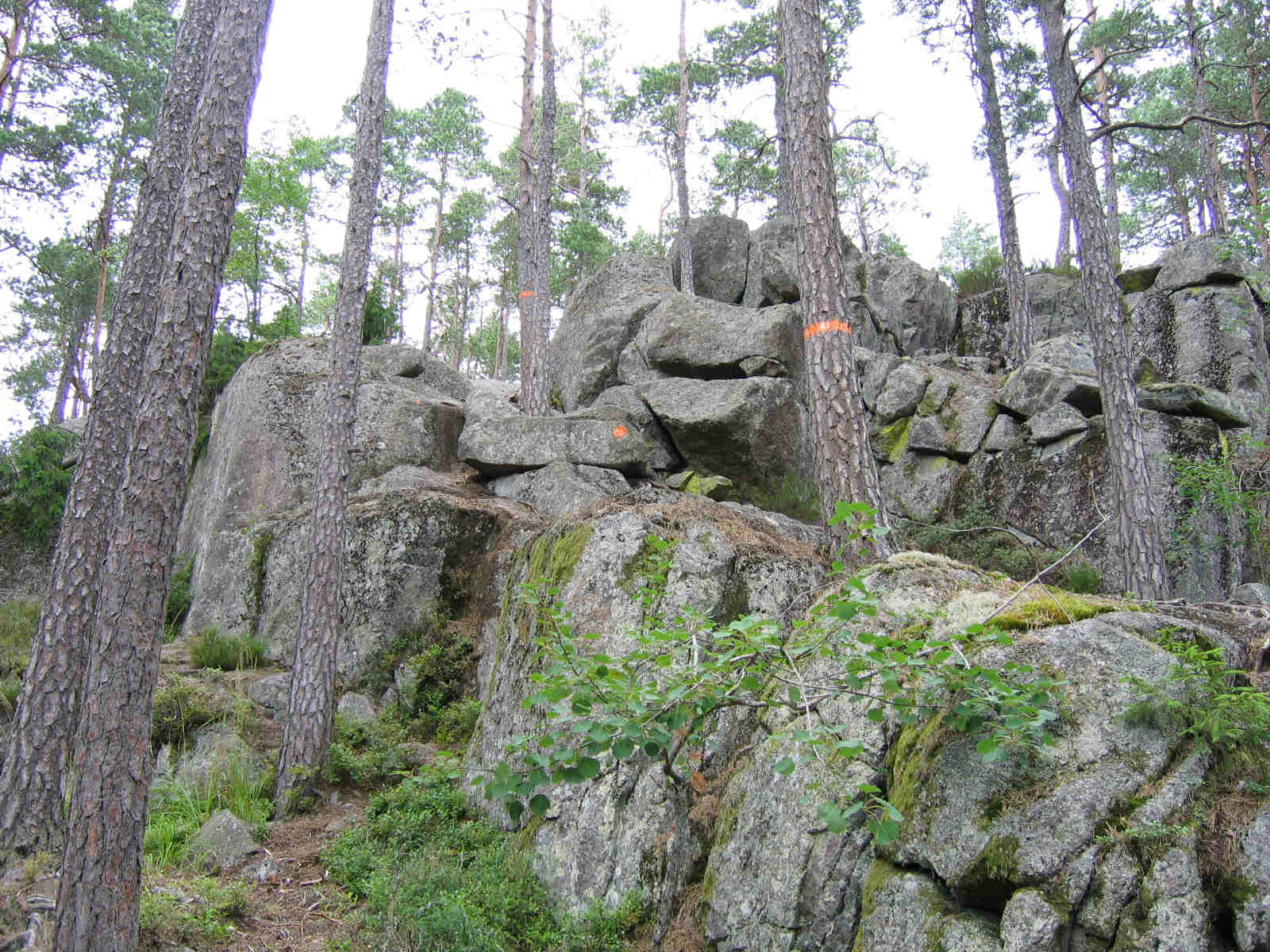
- Interactive map of Tiveden forest
- Location: Örebro County and Västra Götaland County, Sweden
- Coordinates: 58°43′N 14°36′E

Tiveden is a long and wide densely forested rocky ridge in Sweden, throughout history notorious for its wilderness and dangers; historically a hiding place for outlaws. In historic times it, along with Tylöskog and Kolmården, formed the border between the land of the Swedes and the land of the Geats.

Within it, the Tiveden National Park has a designated area of 20.3 km (12.6 mi), a comparatively small and arguably the most inaccessible part of the forest. It was established in 1983, and administratively belongs to the municipalities of Karlsborg and Laxå.

== History ==
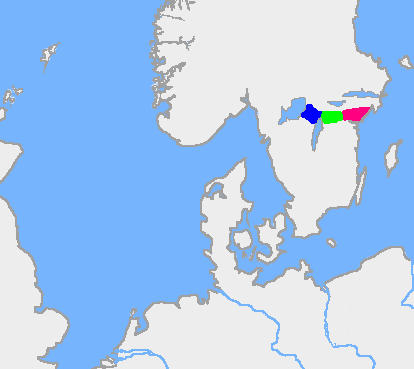
The old forest border between Swedes (Suiones) and Geats. Blue=Tiveden; green=Tylöskog; red=Kolmården

The name is very old and disputed. -Ved is cognate to English Wood and the first part of its name, Ti-, either means "god" or refers to the god Týr, both descendants of the word meaning “god”. Tiveden separates Närke from Västergötland, and was formerly a frontier between the Geats and the Swedes.

The national park area has never been inhabited, but there are several ancient remains of human activities such as worshipping grounds and sacrificial sites.

== Geography ==
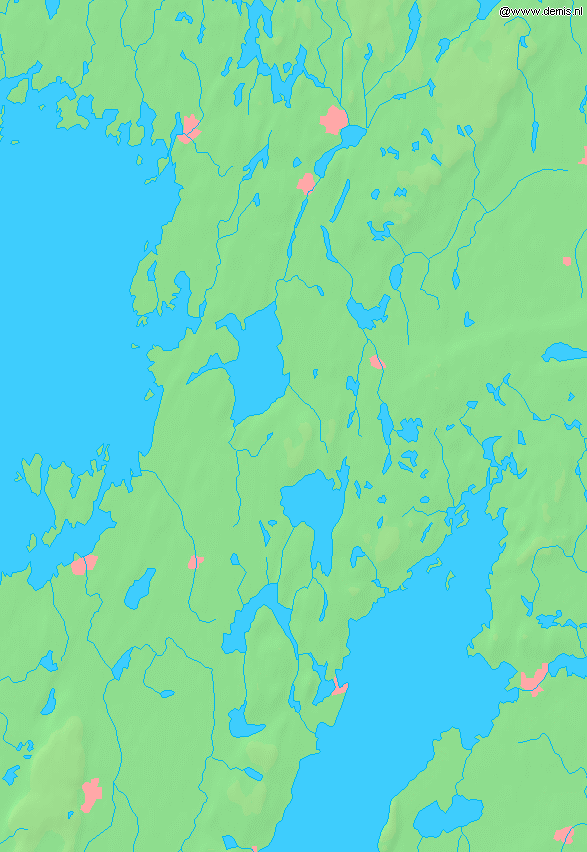
Details of Tiveden location between lakes Vänern and Vättern

The forest has small lakes with red waterlilies. When they were discovered they provided the European varieties of red waterlilies that are in cultivation. The folklore tale of how this became goes as follows:

At the lake of Fagertärn, there was once a poor fisherman who had a beautiful daughter. The small lake gave little fish and the fisherman had difficulties providing for his little family. One day, as the fisherman was fishing in his little dugout of oak, he met the Nix, who offered him great catches of fish on the condition that the fisherman gave him his beautiful daughter the day she was eighteen years old. The desperate fisherman agreed and promised the Nix his daughter. The day the girl was eighteen she went down to the shore to meet the Nix. The Nix gladly asked her to walk down to his watery abode, but the girl took forth a knife and said that he would never have her alive, then stuck the knife into her heart and fell down into the lake, dead. Then, her blood coloured the waterlilies red, and from that day the waterlilies of some of the lake's forests are red.

— Karlsson 1970, 86

The animal life is scarce, but the forest houses a substantial population of western capercaillie. Nowadays there are small populations of wolves, lynxes and wolverines in Tiveden. Bears have also been sighted.

== See also ==
Related forests:

- Tylöskog
- Kolmården
- Trollkyrka
- Skaga Stave Church
