= Pehr Osbeck =

Swedish explorer, naturalist and an apostle of Carl Linnaeus (1723–1805)

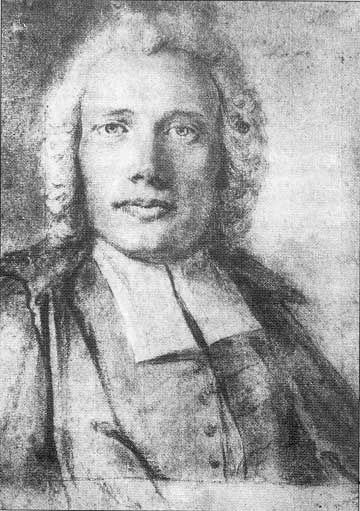
Pehr Osbeck

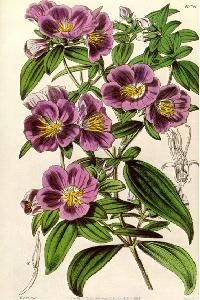
Osbeckia chinensis, drawn by Osbeck

Pehr Osbeck (1723 – 23 December 1805) was a Swedish explorer, naturalist and an apostle of Carl Linnaeus. He was born in the parish of Hålanda on Västergötland and studied at Uppsala with Carolus Linnaeus.

== Naturalist in Canton ==
In 1750–1752 he travelled as chaplain on the ship Prins Carl to Asia where he spent four months studying the flora, fauna, and people of the Canton region of China. He returned home just in time to contribute more than 600 species of plant to Linnaeus' Species Plantarum, published in 1753.

In 1757 he published the journal of his voyage to China, Dagbok öfwer en ostindisk Resa åren 1750, 1751, 1752, which was translated into German in 1762 and English in 1771. In 1758, he was elected a member of the Royal Swedish Academy of Sciences.

== Later career ==
He ended his career as the parish priest of Våxtorp and Hasslöv in Halland, where he died in 1805.

== Collections ==
His large collections are preserved in Sweden and the UK. He is commemorated by the genus Osbeckia L. of plants in the family Melastomataceae.

== Selected works ==
- Osbeck, Pehr (1757). Dagbok öfwer en Ostindisk resa åren 1750, 1751, 1752 : Med anmårkningar uti naturkunnigheten, fråmmande folkslags språk (in Swedish). Vol. 1757. Stockholm: Ludv. Grefing.
- Osbeck, Pehr (1771). A voyage to China and East Indies, Vol. I. London: Benjamin White. [digitized by University of Hong Kong Libraries, Digital Initiatives, "China Through Western Eyes." ]
- Osbeck, Pehr (1771). A voyage to China and East Indies, Vol. II. London: Benjamin White. [digitized by University of Hong Kong Libraries, Digital Initiatives, "China Through Western Eyes." ]
