= Scolytomimus rectus =

Scientific classification
- Kingdom: Animalia
- Phylum: Arthropoda
- Clade: Pancrustacea
- Class: Insecta
- Order: Coleoptera
- Suborder: Polyphaga
- Infraorder: Cucujiformia
- Family: Curculionidae
- Genus: Scolytomimus
- Species: S. rectus

Binomial name
- Scolytomimus rectus Wood, 1988

Species of beetle

Scolytomimus rectus is a species of weevil found in Sri Lanka. The larval host plant is Osbeckia.
