= Skottorp Castle =

Coordinates: 56.436°N 12.979°E

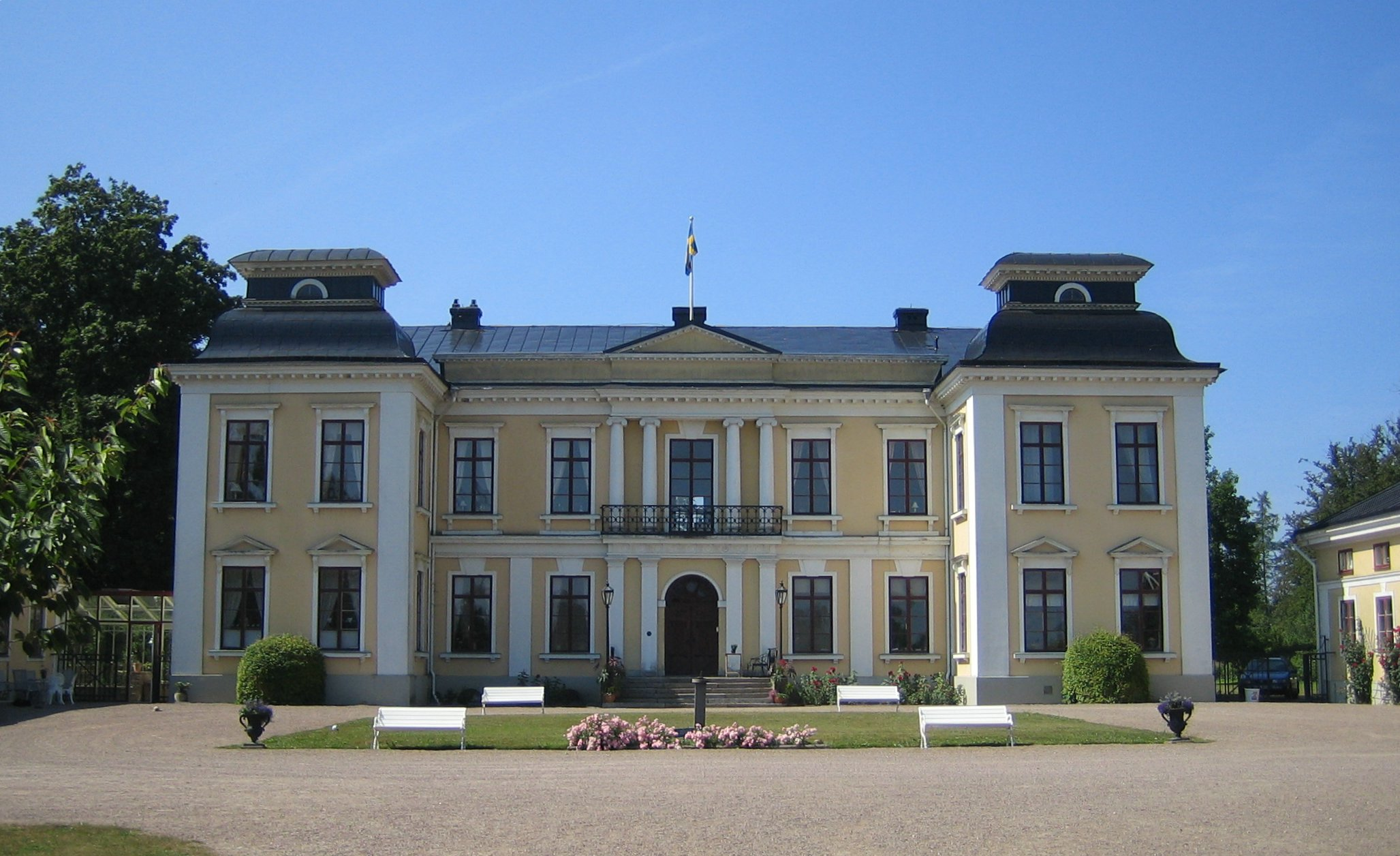
Skottorp Castle

Skottorp Castle (Swedish: Skottorps slott) is a castle in Skummeslöv parish, Laholm municipality in Halland, southern Sweden. The main building consists of two floors and is surrounded on both sides by independent wing buildings. In front of the castle there is an English park. Skottorp is not far from Hallandsåsen. It is a building monument since November 28, 1986.
