= Snowdrop (sculpture) =

1881 sculpture by Per Hasselberg

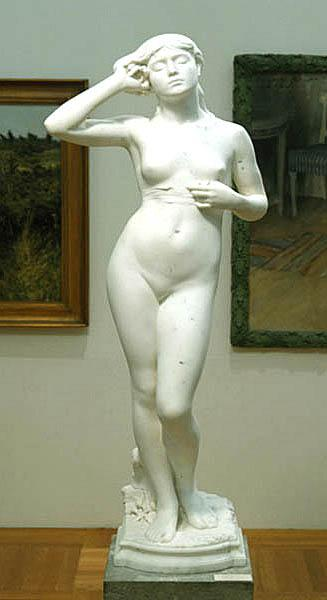
Marble copy at the Nationalmuseum.

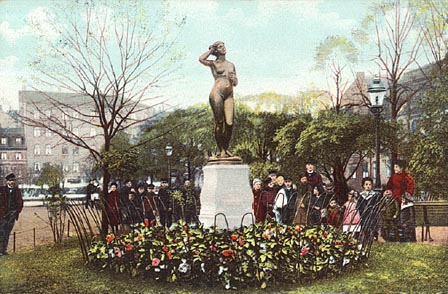
Bronze cast of the work on Mariatorget around 1900.

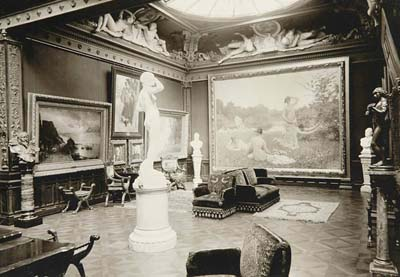
In the 'Fürstenbergska galleriet', with ceiling sculptures also by Hasselberg.

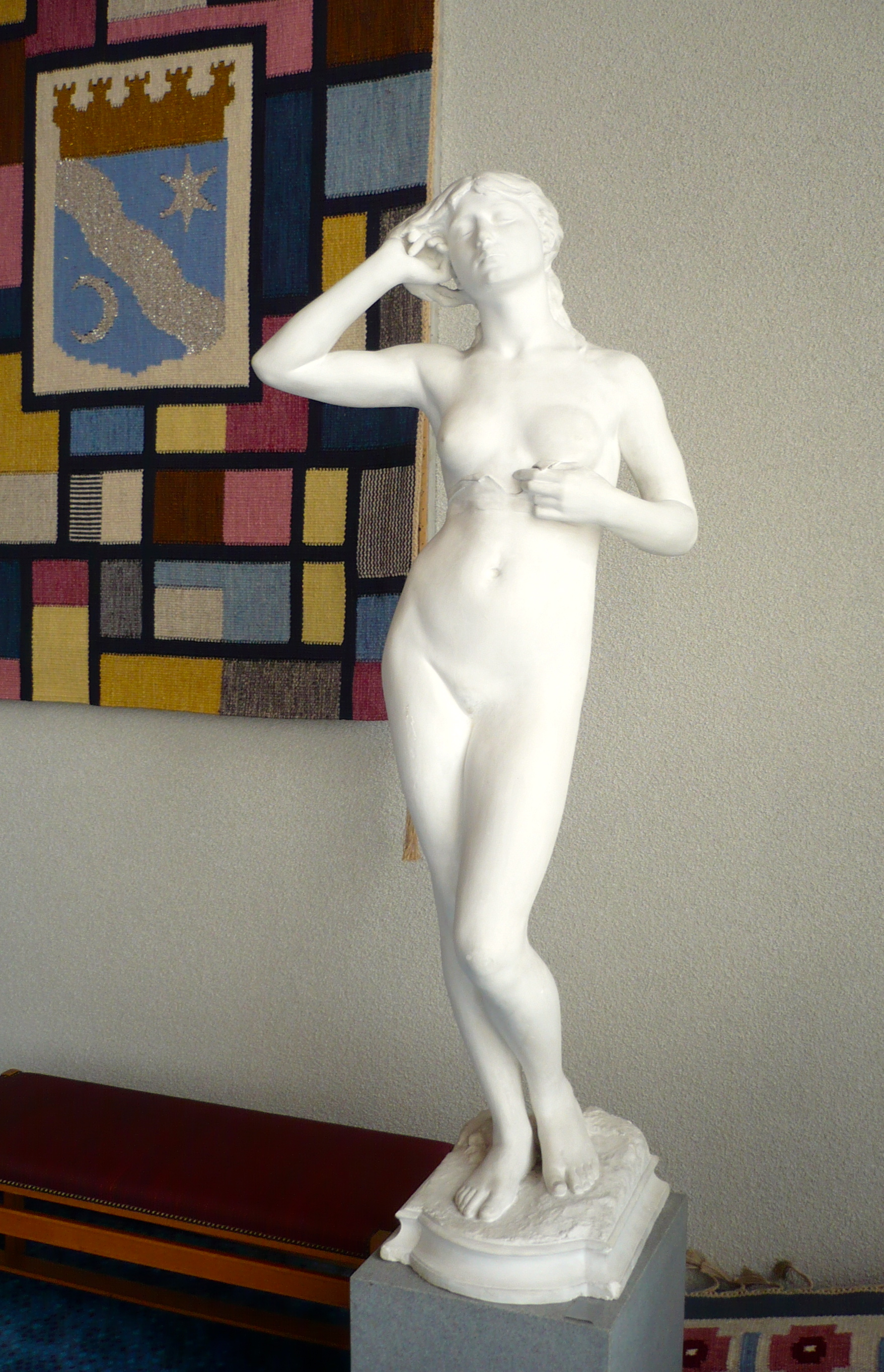
Plaster original, now in the town hall at Ronneby.

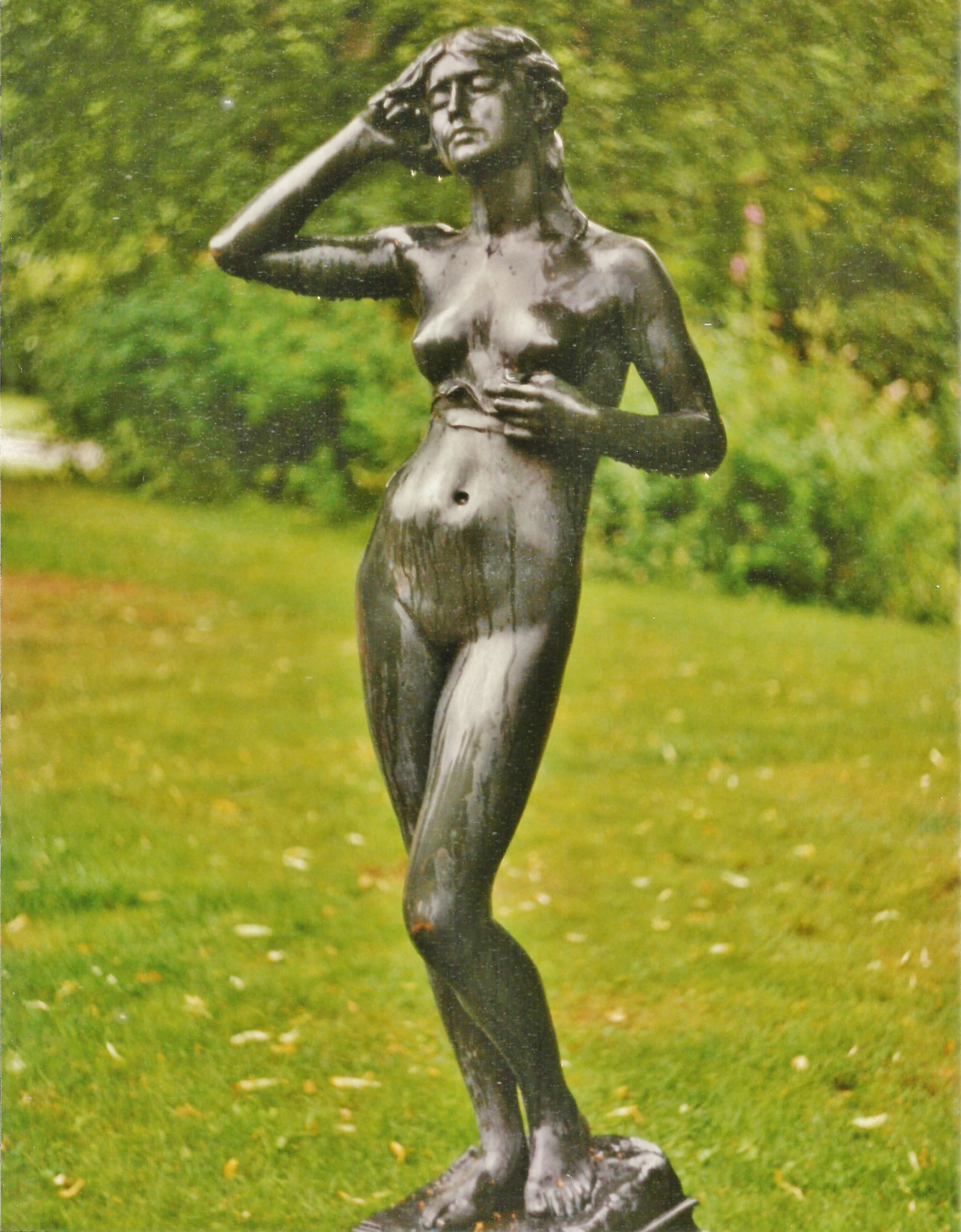
Bronze cast by C & A Nicci (Rome/Italy) from 1953, Rottneros Park near Sunne, Sweden.

Snowdrop (Swedish: Snöklockan; French: La Perce-Neige) is a standing female nude in plaster, sculpted by Per Hasselberg in 1881. It is named after the snowdrop flower at the woman's feet, although the title also refers to its young, innocent subject stepping out of childhood and into womanhood - Hasselberg used a sixteen-year-old Italian girl as a model for the work

Exhibited at the 1881 Paris Salon, it was the only Swedish work of art to receive an honorable mention, leading to Hasselberg's definitive breakthrough as an artist. The Nationalmuseum in Sweden commissioned a copy in marble in 1883 at the cost of 6,000 kroner - this was awarded a gold medal at the 1883 Salon.

The work became very popular in both public and private contexts, leading to high demand for replicas and full-size and smaller reproductions. It was cast in bronze for Stockholm's Mariatorget, the city's first non-honorific public statue - it was funded by director CR Lamm at Ludvigsberg and inaugurated in November 1900.

== Selected copy ==
- Plaster originals (162 cm): Ronneby town-hall (1881), Waldemarsudde (inköpt 1943) and private collection
- Marble originals : Nationalmuseum, Stockholm (1883), Göteborgs konstmuseum (1885), Glyptoteket, Copenhagen (1887-1889) and the Österslättsskolan, Karlshamn (1890).
- Bronze casts:
  - 1900, Meyer's Foundry (Mariatorget, Stockholm)
  - 1910, Nordic Company workshops, Nyköping, Falun
  - 1917, Meyer's Foundry, Ronneby Square
  - 1953, C & A Nicci, Rome for Rottneros Park
- Miniature versions, Parian marble - 1700 (50 cm high) were produced 1888-1926 and 625 (60 cm high) 1887-1926, both at the Gustavberg porcelain factory.
- Statue in Skottorps slottspark.

== Bibliography ==
- Carenberg Carl-Olov, ed. (2005). Pariantillverkning vid Gustavsberg: 1861-1977 (in Swedish). Motala. p. 43. SELIBR 12079406.
- Annika Gunnarsson, ed. (2010). Per Hasselberg. Waldemarsuddes utställningskatalog 0282-0323; 95:10. Malmö: Arena/Åmells Artbooks. ISBN 978-91-7843-325-4. SELIBR 11659598.
- Flemming Friborg: "Europæisk skulptur", Ny Carlsberg Glyptotek 1997, ISBN 87-7452-228-0, s. 108-109.
- Hvar 8 dag : illustreradt magasin, Andra årgången (1 oktober 1900 - 29 september 1901), D F Bonnier, Göteborg 1901, s. 112.
- Nationalencyklopedin, Band 8, 1992, ISBN 91-7024-620-3, s. 428.
- Göran Söderlund och Christina Wistman (katalogredaktörer), Lars Engelhardt, Per Myrehed, Sven Nilsson, C.G. Rosenberg och Erik Cornelius (foto):"Svenska klassiker - Från historiemåleri och romantik till sekelskiftets stämningsmåleri 1860-1910", Prins Eugens Waldemarsudde, Utställningskatalog nr 59:01, ISBN 91-88040-60-7, s. 146.
- Lennart Wærn: "In memoriam Coco et Coco redivivus - Studier kring ett "förlorat" och "återfunnet" hasselbergverk" i "Det skapande jaget", Konstvetenskapliga institutionen, Göteborgs universitet 1996, ISBN 91-85198-13-7, s. 130 och 132.
- Wettre Håkan; Ahlfort Barbro; Carlsson Ebbe (1992). Göteborgs konstmuseum: [dess historia och samlingar] (in Swedish). Göteborg: Göteborgs konstmuseum. p. 126. ISBN 91-87968-13-4. SELIBR 7768016.
