= Våxtorp =

- Location within Halland Location within Sweden
- Coordinates: 56°25′N 13°07′E
- Country: Sweden
- Province: Halland
- County: Halland County
- Municipality: Laholm Municipality

Area
  - Total: 1.36 km^{2} (0.53 sq mi)

Population (31 December 2010)
  - Total: 970
  - Density: 711/km^{2} (1,840/sq mi)
- Time zone: UTC+1 (CET)
  - Summer (DST): UTC+2 (CEST)

Våxtorp (Swedish pronunciation: [ˈvɔ̂kstɔrp]) is a locality situated in Laholm Municipality, Halland County, Sweden, with 970 inhabitants in 2010.

The village is situated not too far from the horst Hallandsåsen and the national highway number 24 runs through it. Most of the modern settlement has grown around the crossing of the roads from Båstad to Hishult and Laholm to Örkelljunga. In the beginning of the last century the village was not more than a couple of farms near this crossing. The most noted landmark is the church of the Våxtorp-Hasslöv parish and the two skiing centres.

The settlement dates back at least to the Middle Ages when the church was built. It is a possibility that the area has been settled since the Bronze Age given the existence of at least one Bronze Age burial mound (several were, as in southern Sweden in general removed during the 17th and 18th century).

The coat of arms, which was granted to the then municipality of Våxtorp (which were integrated with Laholm 1971) is a swan and two lines) in 1967. It had however been in use since the Middle Ages when the lords to the manor of Vallen used it as their personal coat of arms.

For its size the village has a large number of active sports organisations counting one soccer team and a volleyball team which has reached the next to highest national league at some occasions.
