= Vallberga =

- Location within Halland Location within Sweden
- Coordinates: 56°28′N 13°01′E
- Country: Sweden
- Province: Halland
- County: Halland County
- Municipality: Laholm Municipality

Area
  - Total: 0.87 km^{2} (0.34 sq mi)

Population (31 December 2010)
  - Total: 657
  - Density: 758/km^{2} (1,960/sq mi)
- Time zone: UTC+1 (CET)
  - Summer (DST): UTC+2 (CEST)

Vallberga is a locality situated in Laholm Municipality, Halland County, Sweden with 657 inhabitants in 2010.
