= Osbeckia lanata =

Scientific classification
- Kingdom: Plantae
- Clade: Tracheophytes
- Clade: Angiosperms
- Clade: Eudicots
- Clade: Rosids
- Order: Myrtales
- Family: Melastomataceae
- Genus: Osbeckia
- Species: O. lanata

Binomial name
- Osbeckia lanata Alston

Species of flowering plant

Osbeckia lanata is a flowering plant in the genus Osbeckia. It is native to the mountains of southern Sri Lanka.

Osbeckia lanata Alston. is synonymous with Osbeckia buxifolia var. minor Thwait. and Osbeckia walkeri var. becketii Triana.

== Description ==
It has small and crowded leaves that are between oval and rotund in shape. The apices of leaves are emarginate and they have rounded bases. Leaves contain three major depressed veins from the base; the undersides of these contain long brown hairs. The trunk is much-branched. The crown is flat-topped. Twigs have copious brownish wool. The plant's flowers are rich mauve and numerous. Bracts are leaf-like, have reddish-brown hairs, are solitary or in groups of three, and sessile. Fruits are capsules.

== Ecology ==
It is found in montane forest understory. The type specimen was collected by GHK Thwaites in 1853 at an altitude of 2,134 m. The sites where the plant was recorded for Flora of Ceylon in February and March 1977 were also at high altitudes, between 1,980 m on the side-cone of Adam's Peak and near Galagama Falls close to the border between Sri Lanka's Central Province and Sabaragamuwa Province, and 2,225 m and 2,286 m, further north on the border between Madhyama Province and Uva Province.
