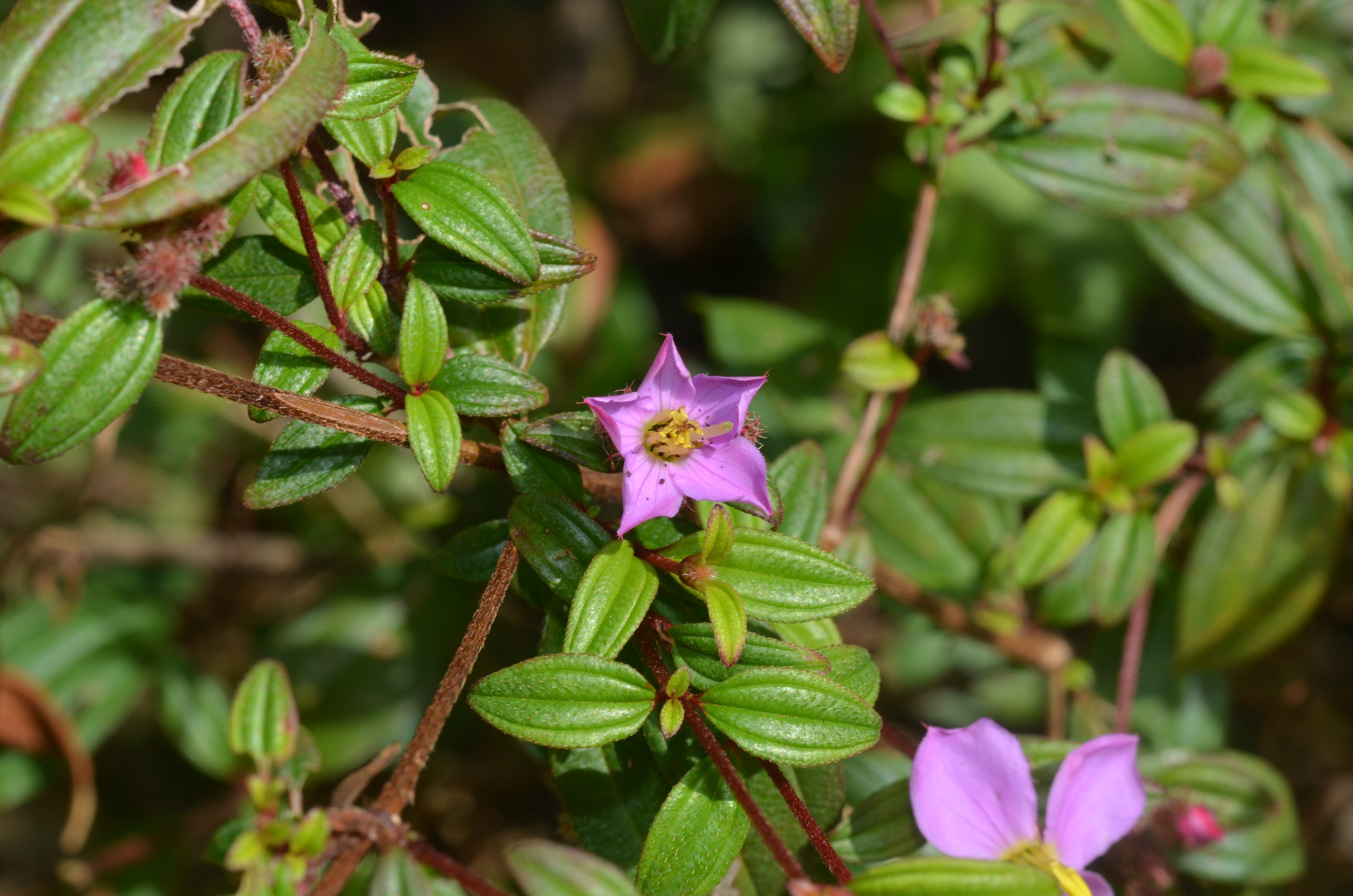

Scientific classification
- Kingdom: Plantae
- Clade: Tracheophytes
- Clade: Angiosperms
- Clade: Eudicots
- Clade: Rosids
- Order: Myrtales
- Family: Melastomataceae
- Genus: Osbeckia
- Species: O. octandra

Binomial name
- Osbeckia octandra DC.

Synonyms
- Alosemis zeylanica Raf., nom. illeg. superfl.; Asterostoma octandra (L.) Blume; Melastoma octandrum L.; Osbeckia polycephala Naud.; Osbeckia simsii DC.

= Osbeckia octandra =

Species of flowering plant

Osbeckia octandra, the eight stamen osbeckia, is a plant species in the genus Osbeckia of the family Melastomataceae. It is considered to be endemic to Sri Lanka, where it is known as "Heen Bovitiya - හීන් බෝවිටියා" in Sinhala language. But some texts indicate that it is also found in Tamil Nadu of India. Fruits are dry capsules with numerous seeds. Leaves and young stems are edible, whereas leaves, stem and bark also widely used as a valuable medicine in Ayurveda for treating Diabetes mellitus, Hepatitis, Jaundice, and Hyperlipidaemia. The juice extracted from Osbeckia octandra leaves is an effective treatment for liver damage caused by Paracetamol poisoning

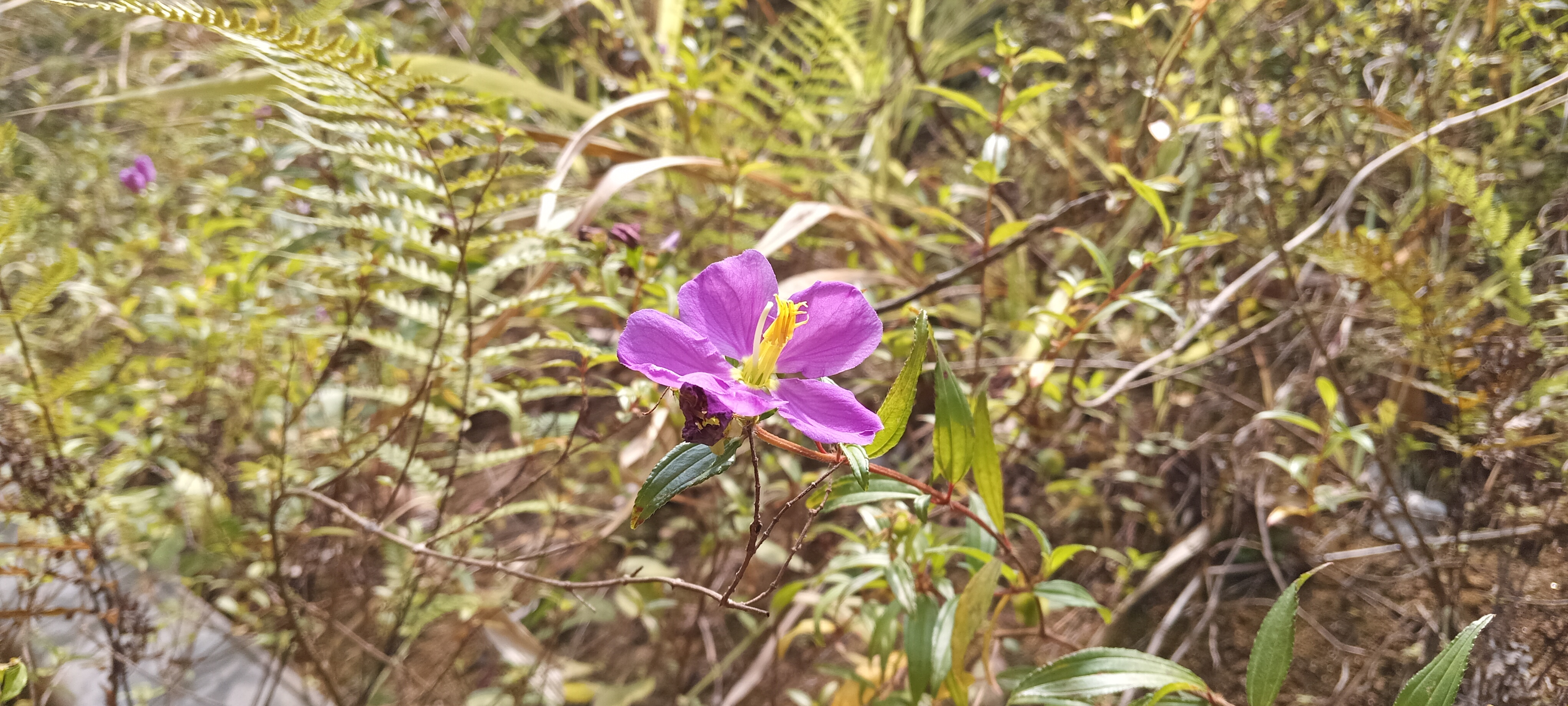

== Description ==
Osbeckia octandra is an erect plant that contains an erect stem from the upper surface of the soil level and a root system from the lower surface of the soil level. The stem is covered with hair-like trichomes. The stem is not much broad.

Nodes and leaves arise from the branches. Leaves are arranged alternatively around the branches to get the maximum amount of sunlight for efficient photosynthesis.

The leaves are approximately 5 cm in length. The upper surface of the leaves is dark green and the lower surface of the leaves is light green. The leaf margin is smooth and along the leaf margin trichomes are present and are clearly visible to the naked eye. Three main veins are present on the leaf surface. The middle one is the major one and it is known as the midrib and from a similar distance from the midrib on both sides, the other two veins are also present. On the upper surface along the midrib and two veins no trichomes are present but from the lower surface along the midrib and veins trichomes are present. The lower surface of the leaf is covered with trichomes more than the upper surface. Trichomes give the rough appearance to the leaves.

Flower buds appears on the tip of the branches. Flowers are pinkish–purple in color. In the middle of the flower, pollen grains are present as yellow color parts. Petals are smooth and fleshy. Petal margins are folded into the outside of the flower and five petals are present in each flower. Flower is very beautiful. It attracts insects for pollination. Bovitiya flowers, leaves, stems and roots (almost all parts of the plant) are use in Ayurveda medications such as liver diseases and diabetes.
