= Genevad =

- Location within Halland Location within Sweden
- Coordinates: 56°34′N 13°01′E
- Country: Sweden
- Province: Halland
- County: Halland County
- Municipality: Laholm Municipality

Area
  - Total: 0.62 km^{2} (0.24 sq mi)

Population (31 December 2010)
  - Total: 565
  - Density: 910/km^{2} (2,400/sq mi)
- Time zone: UTC+1 (CET)
  - Summer (DST): UTC+2 (CEST)

Genevad is a locality situated in Laholm Municipality, Halland County, Sweden with 565 inhabitants in 2010.
