= Skottorp =

- Location within Halland Location within Sweden
- Coordinates: 56°27′N 12°57′E
- Country: Sweden
- Province: Halland
- County: Halland County
- Municipality: Laholm Municipality

Area
  - Total: 0.76 km^{2} (0.29 sq mi)

Population (31 December 2010)
  - Total: 475
  - Density: 625/km^{2} (1,620/sq mi)
- Time zone: UTC+1 (CET)
  - Summer (DST): UTC+2 (CEST)

Skottorp is a locality situated in Laholm Municipality, Halland County, Sweden with 475 inhabitants in 2010.
