= Ysby =

- Location within Halland Location within Sweden
- Coordinates: 56°30′N 13°07′E
- Country: Sweden
- Province: Halland
- County: Halland County
- Municipality: Laholm Municipality

Area
  - Total: 0.36 km^{2} (0.14 sq mi)

Population (31 December 2010)
  - Total: 260
  - Density: 726/km^{2} (1,880/sq mi)
- Time zone: UTC+1 (CET)
  - Summer (DST): UTC+2 (CEST)

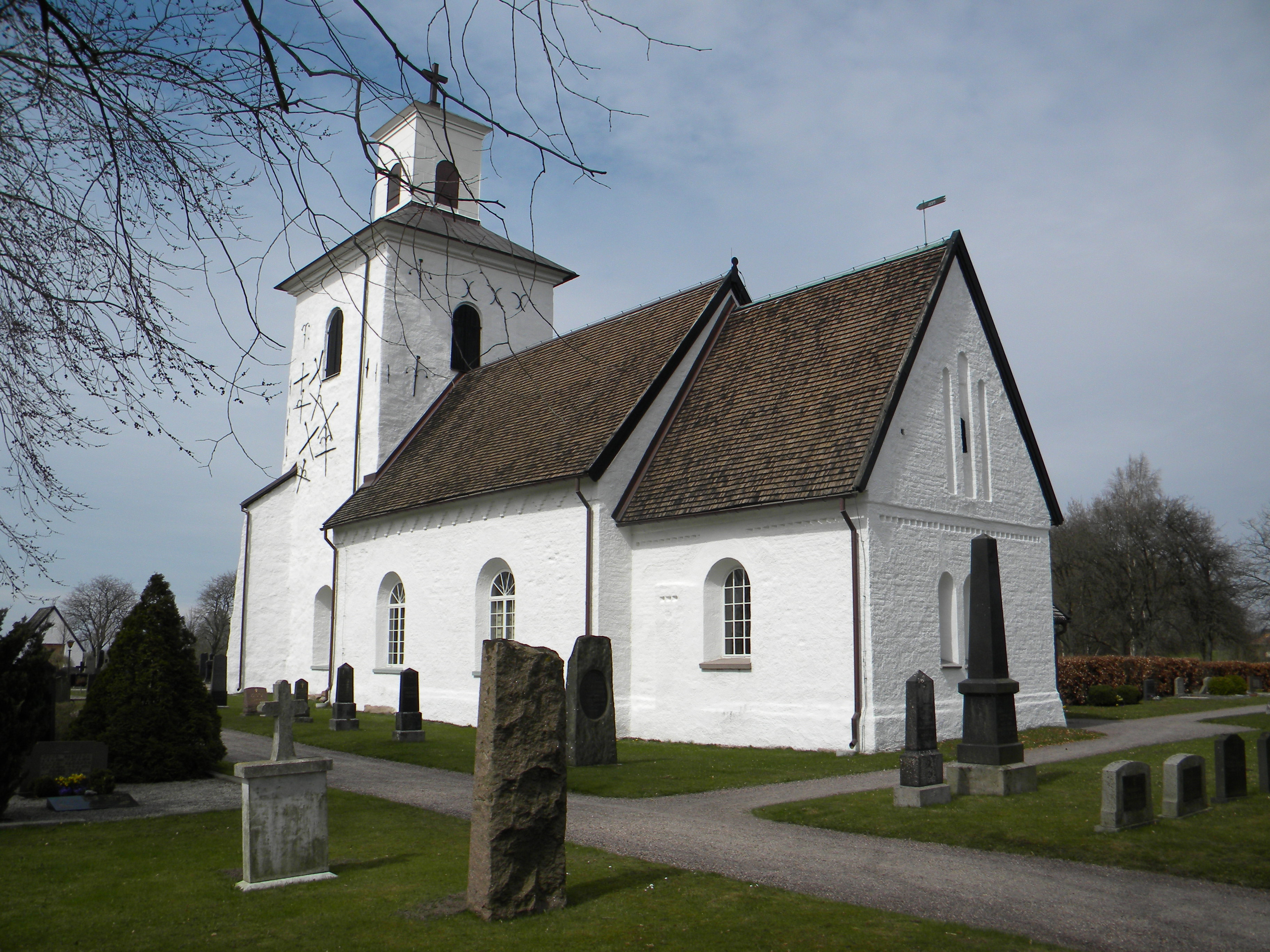
Ysby church

Ysby is a locality situated in Laholm Municipality, Halland County, Sweden, with 260 inhabitants in 2010.
