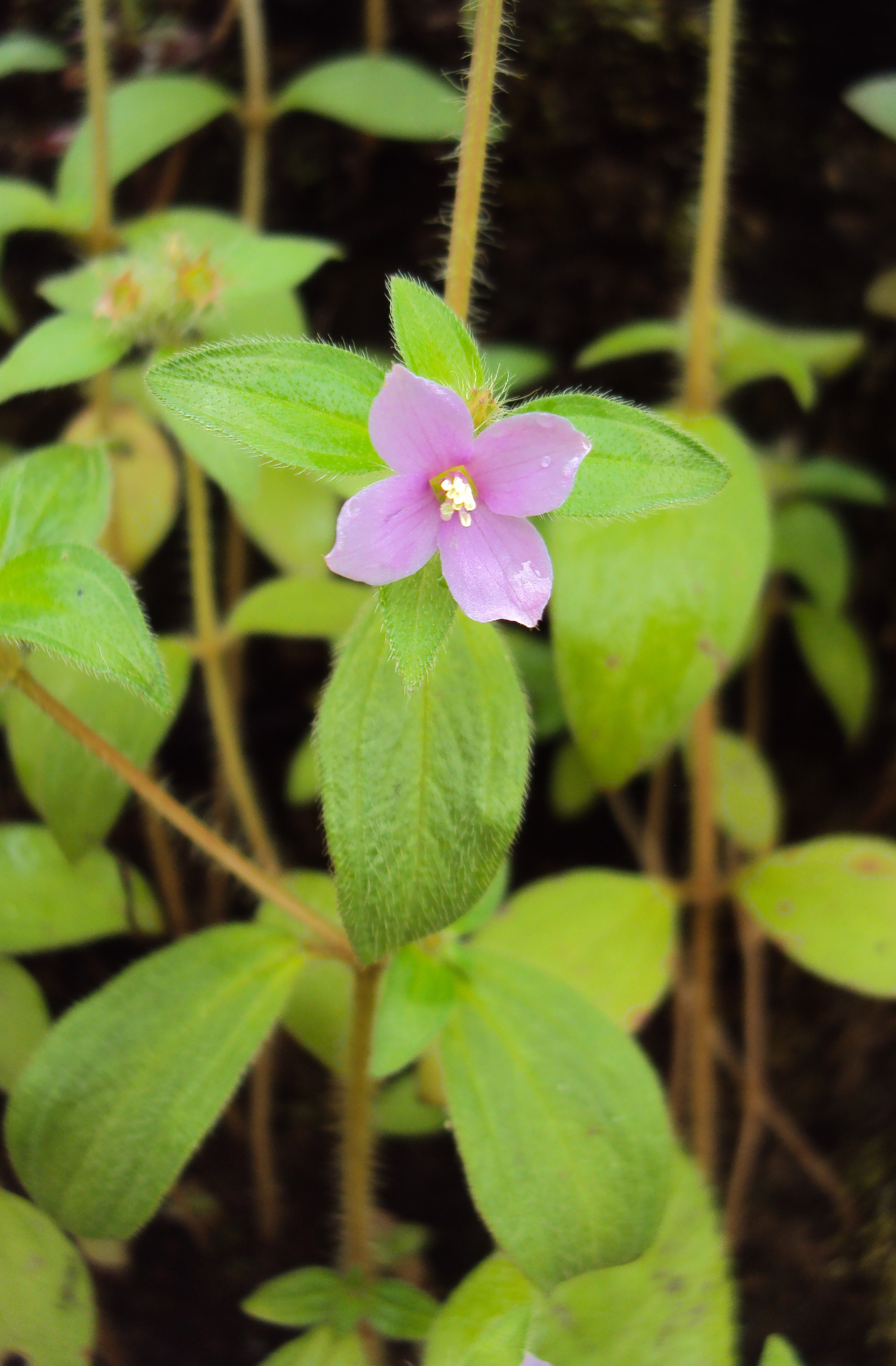

Scientific classification
- Kingdom: Plantae
- Clade: Tracheophytes
- Clade: Angiosperms
- Clade: Eudicots
- Clade: Rosids
- Order: Myrtales
- Family: Melastomataceae
- Genus: Osbeckia
- Species: O. muralis

Binomial name
- Osbeckia muralis Naudin

= Osbeckia muralis =

Species of plant

Osbeckia muralis is a species of plant. It goes by the common names cherkulathi and wall osbeckia.

The species is native to India and Nepal.

It is commonly used by ethnomedical practitioners in the Dakshina Kannada District. A decoction, derived from the plant's flowers, is given to children that have skin diseases.
