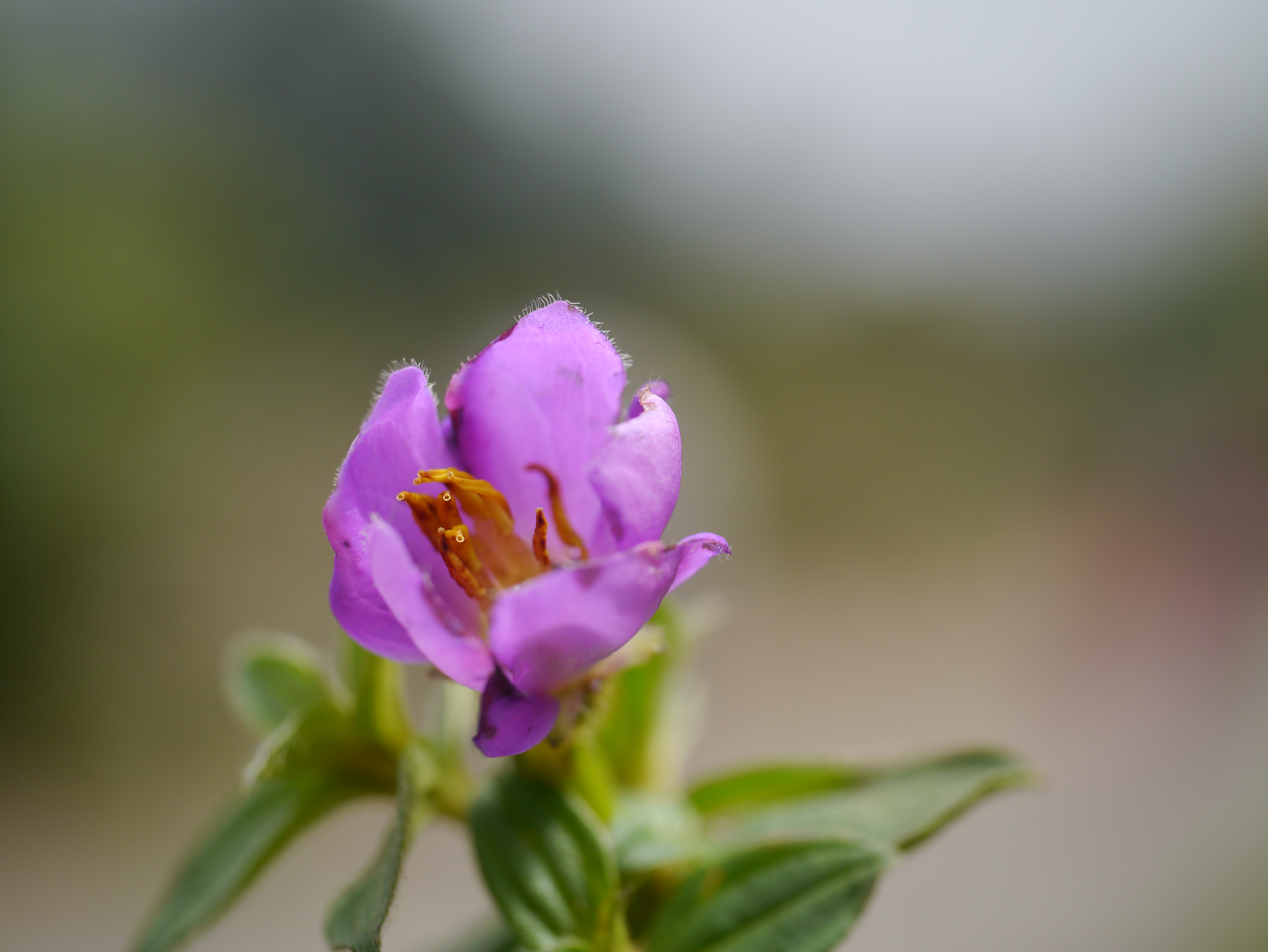

Scientific classification
- Kingdom: Plantae
- Clade: Tracheophytes
- Clade: Angiosperms
- Clade: Eudicots
- Clade: Rosids
- Order: Myrtales
- Family: Melastomataceae
- Genus: Osbeckia
- Species: O. aspera

Binomial name
- Osbeckia aspera Blume

= Osbeckia aspera =

Rough osbeckia

Species of flowering plant

Osbeckia aspera, the rough osbeckia or rough small-leaved spider flower, is a plant species in the genus Osbeckia of the family Melastomataceae. It is native to India and Sri Lanka. Leaves are elliptic-lanceolate, base attenuate with more or less velvet-hairy on both sides. Flowers are pink in color, show terminal cymes inflorescence. Fruits are single seeded capsule.

== Common name ==
- Malayalam - kaattukadali (കാട്ടുകദളി)
- Tamil - kattu-k-kadalai (காட்டுக்கடலை)
