= Lilla Tjärby =

- Location within Halland Location within Sweden
- Coordinates: 56°32′N 13°02′E
- Country: Sweden
- Province: Halland
- County: Halland County
- Municipality: Laholm Municipality

Area
  - Total: 0.80 km^{2} (0.31 sq mi)

Population (31 December 2010)
  - Total: 914
  - Density: 1,146/km^{2} (2,970/sq mi)
- Time zone: UTC+1 (CET)
  - Summer (DST): UTC+2 (CEST)

Lilla Tjärby is a locality situated in Laholm Municipality, Halland County, Sweden with 914 inhabitants in 2010.
