= Laholm Municipality =

Laholm Municipality Laholms kommun
- Municipality
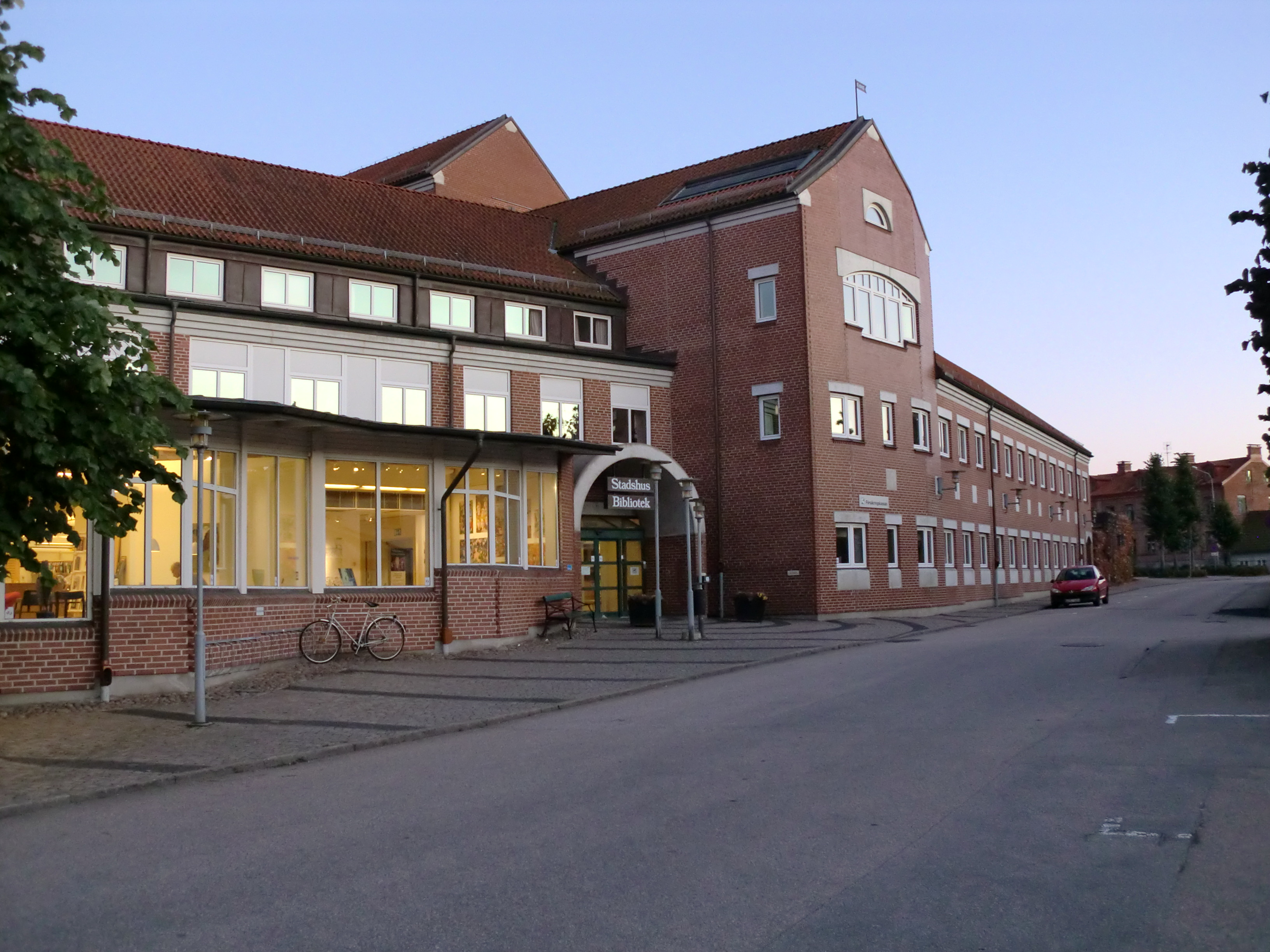
- Laholm town hall

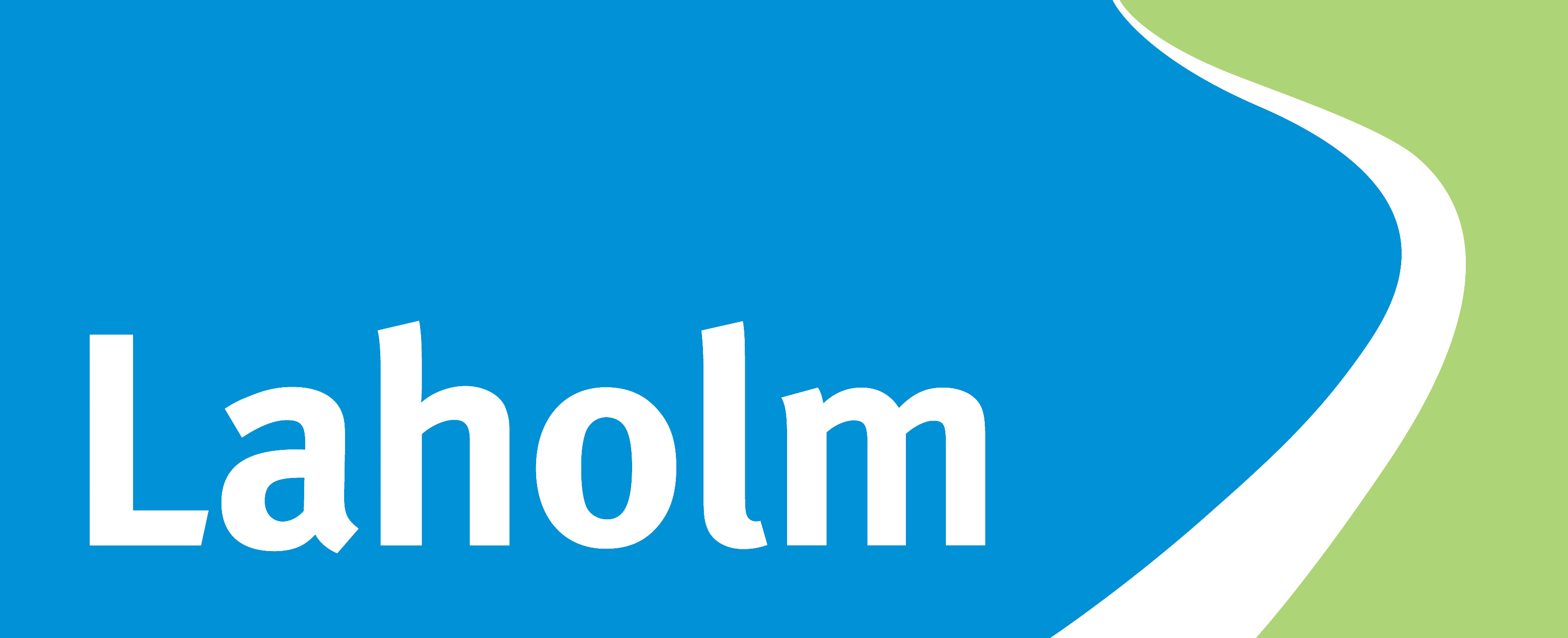
- Coat of arms Wordmark

- Coordinates: 56°31′N 13°02′E
- Country: Sweden
- County: Halland County
- Seat: Laholm

Area
  - Total: 963.38 km^{2} (371.96 sq mi)
  - Land: 882.96 km^{2} (340.91 sq mi)
  - Water: 80.42 km^{2} (31.05 sq mi)
- Area as of 1 January 2014.

Population (30 June 2025)
  - Total: 26,632
  - Density: 30.162/km^{2} (78.120/sq mi)
- Time zone: UTC+1 (CET)
  - Summer (DST): UTC+2 (CEST)
- ISO 3166 code: SE
- Province: Halland
- Municipal code: 1381
- Website: www.laholm.se

Laholm Municipality (Swedish: Laholms kommun) is a municipality in Halland County in southwest Sweden. The seat is located in Laholm.

The amalgamation process during the local government reform in the 1970s took place in two steps. In 1971 the City of Laholm merged with two rural municipalities forming the unitary municipality and three years later four more units were added.

== Localities ==
There are 14 urban areas (also called a Tätort or locality) in Laholm Municipality.

In the table the localities are listed according to the size of the population as of December 31, 2010. The municipal seat is in bold characters.

#	Locality	Population
1	**Laholm**	6,150
2	Mellbystrand	1,619
3	Veinge	1,190
4	Knäred	1,088
5	Våxtorp	970
6	Lilla Tjärby	914
7	Vallberga	657
8	Genevad	565
9	Skummeslövsstrand	491
10	Skottorp	475
11	Ränneslöv	413
12	Hishult	332
13	Ysby	260
14	Hasslöv	228

== Demographics ==
This is a demographic table based on Laholm Municipality's electoral districts in the 2022 Swedish general election sourced from SVT's election platform, in turn taken from SCB official statistics.

In total there were 26,276 residents, including 20,080 Swedish citizens of voting age. 38.3% voted for the left coalition and 60.6% for the right coalition. Indicators are in percentage points except population totals and income.

Location	Residents	Citizen adults	Left vote	Right vote	Employed	Swedish parents	Foreign heritage	Income SEK	Degree
Location			%	%					
Hasslöv-Skottorp	1,405	992	33.3	66.4	83	84	16	25,943	33
Hishult	972	728	34.5	64.6	81	88	12	22,683	23
Knäred	1,822	1,339	37.1	61.7	75	76	24	21,313	25
Laholm C	2,387	1,923	48.8	49.9	76	77	23	21,414	32
Laholm N	1,878	1,489	38.3	61.2	82	80	20	24,808	31
Laholm V	2,334	1,819	41.4	58.0	85	80	20	26,538	38
Laholm Ö	2,587	1,766	45.3	53.3	74	66	34	23,139	32
Mellbystrand	2,482	2,097	34.1	65.0	85	93	7	28,355	46
Ränneslöv	1,312	1,019	33.4	65.3	88	90	10	25,243	27
Skummeslöv	1,842	1,540	33.2	66.0	84	89	11	27,297	52
Tjärby	1,541	1,097	40.0	58.7	81	77	23	24,695	28
Vallberga-Ysby	1,497	1,101	33.6	64.7	84	79	21	24,612	25
Veinge	1,878	1,360	37.5	61.3	80	84	16	23,809	29
Våxtorp	2,339	1,810	38.3	60.9	83	85	15	23,663	26
Source: SVT

== Elections ==
Below are the results listed since the 1973 municipal reform. Between 1988 and 1998 the Sweden Democrats' results were not published by the SCB due to the party's small size nationwide. "Turnout" denotes the percentage of the electorate casting a ballot, but "Votes" only applies to valid ballots cast.

=== Riksdag ===
Year	Turnout	Votes	V	S	MP	C	L	KD	M	SD	ND
1973	91.9	12,714	1.2	27.4	0.0	54.1	5.0	0.5	11.5	0.0	0.0
1976	92.5	13,792	1.2	26.8	0.0	51.1	7.2	0.5	13.2	0.0	0.0
1979	91.5	14,103	1.9	27.9	0.0	41.5	7.7	0.5	20.2	0.0	0.0
1982	91.6	14,270	2.1	30.2	1.3	37.4	4.3	1.2	23.2	0.0	0.0
1985	89.6	14,108	1.9	31.1	1.7	31.0	11.4	0.0	22.8	0.0	0.0
1988	85.9	13,666	2.5	32.2	5.6	30.0	9.4	1.9	18.3	0.0	0.0
1991	86.1	14,203	1.9	27.1	3.4	22.1	6.5	6.6	22.8	0.0	8.6
1994	85.9	14,444	3.5	35.1	5.3	21.3	4.4	3.6	23.8	0.0	1.8
1998	81.1	13,544	7.1	28.7	4.1	13.3	2.9	13.7	23.4	0.0	0.0
2002	79.0	13,404	4.7	32.9	3.5	16.3	10.2	11.4	16.6	1.2	0.0
2006	81.4	14,180	3.7	28.7	3.4	15.9	5.5	6.4	27.9	6.1	0.0
2010	84.0	15,135	3.2	25.3	4.6	12.9	5.7	4.7	33.4	8.7	0.0
2014	86.0	15,661	3.0	27.0	5.1	11.3	3.9	3.9	24.8	18.3	0.0

Blocs

This lists the relative strength of the socialist and centre-right blocs since 1973, but parties not elected to the Riksdag are inserted as "other", including the Sweden Democrats results from 1988 to 2006, but also the Christian Democrats pre-1991 and the Greens in 1982, 1985 and 1991. The sources are identical to the table above. The coalition or government mandate marked in bold formed the government after the election. New Democracy got elected in 1991 but are still listed as "other" due to the short lifespan of the party. "Elected" is the total number of percentage points from the municipality that went to parties who were elected to the Riksdag.

Year	Turnout	Votes	Left	Right	SD	Other	Elected
1973	91.9	12,714	**28.6**	70.6	0.0	0.8	99.2
1976	92.5	13,792	28.0	**71.5**	0.0	0.5	99.5
1979	91.5	14,103	29.8	**69.4**	0.0	0.8	99.2
1982	91.6	14,270	**32.3**	64.9	0.0	2.9	97.1
1985	89.6	14,108	**33.0**	65.2	0.0	1.8	98.2
1988	85.9	13,666	**40.3**	57.7	0.0	2.0	98.0
1991	86.1	14,203	29.0	**58.0**	0.0	13.0	95.6
1994	85.9	14,444	**43.9**	53.1	0.0	3.0	97.0
1998	81.1	13,544	**39.9**	53.3	0.0	6.8	93.2
2002	79.0	13,404	**41.1**	54.5	0.0	4.4	95.6
2006	81.4	14,180	35.8	**55.7**	0.0	8.5	91.5
2010	84.0	15,135	33.1	**56.7**	8.7	1.5	98.5
2014	86.0	15,661	**35.1**	43.9	18.3	2.7	97.3

== Pictures ==
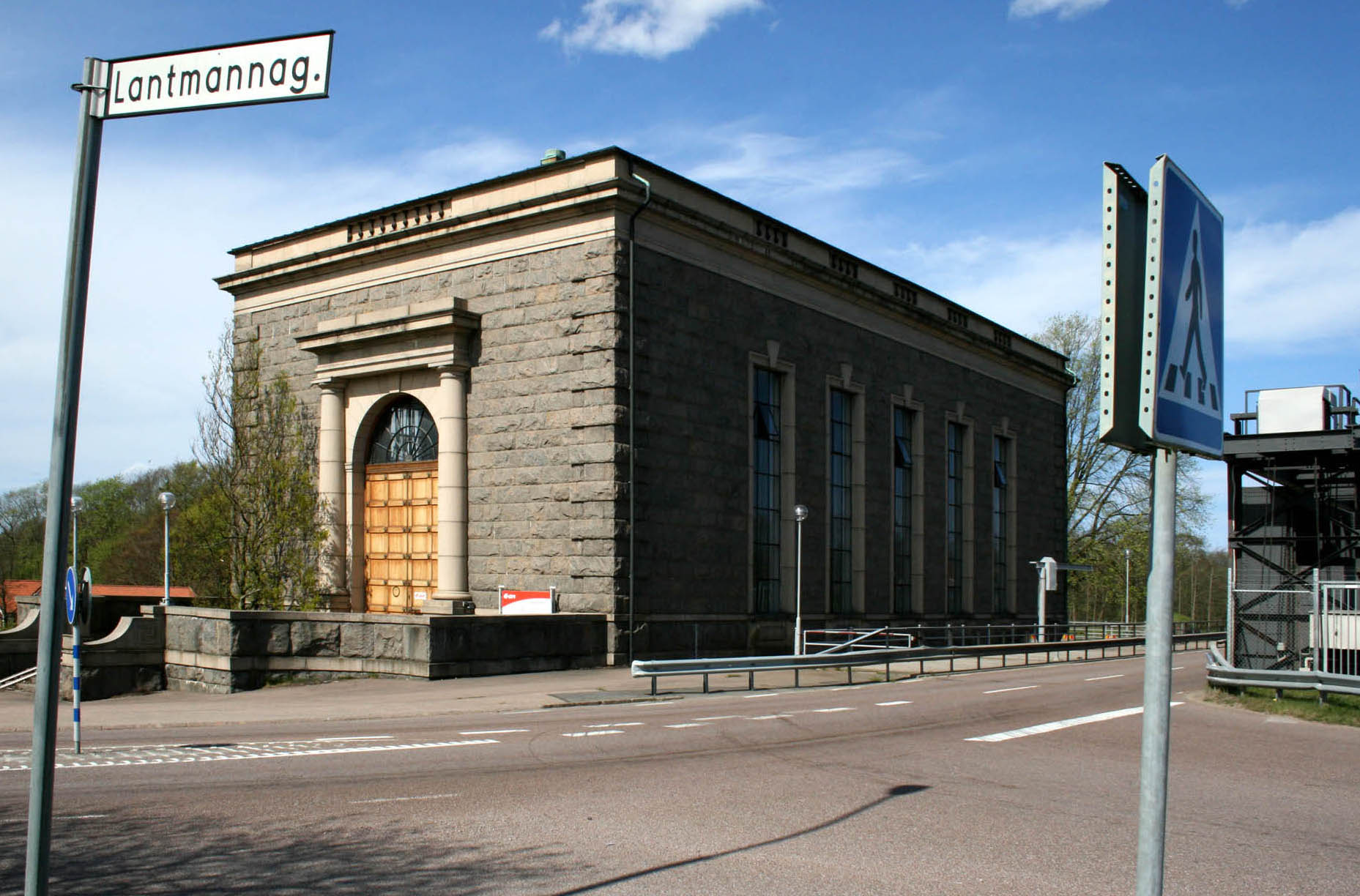
Water power plant

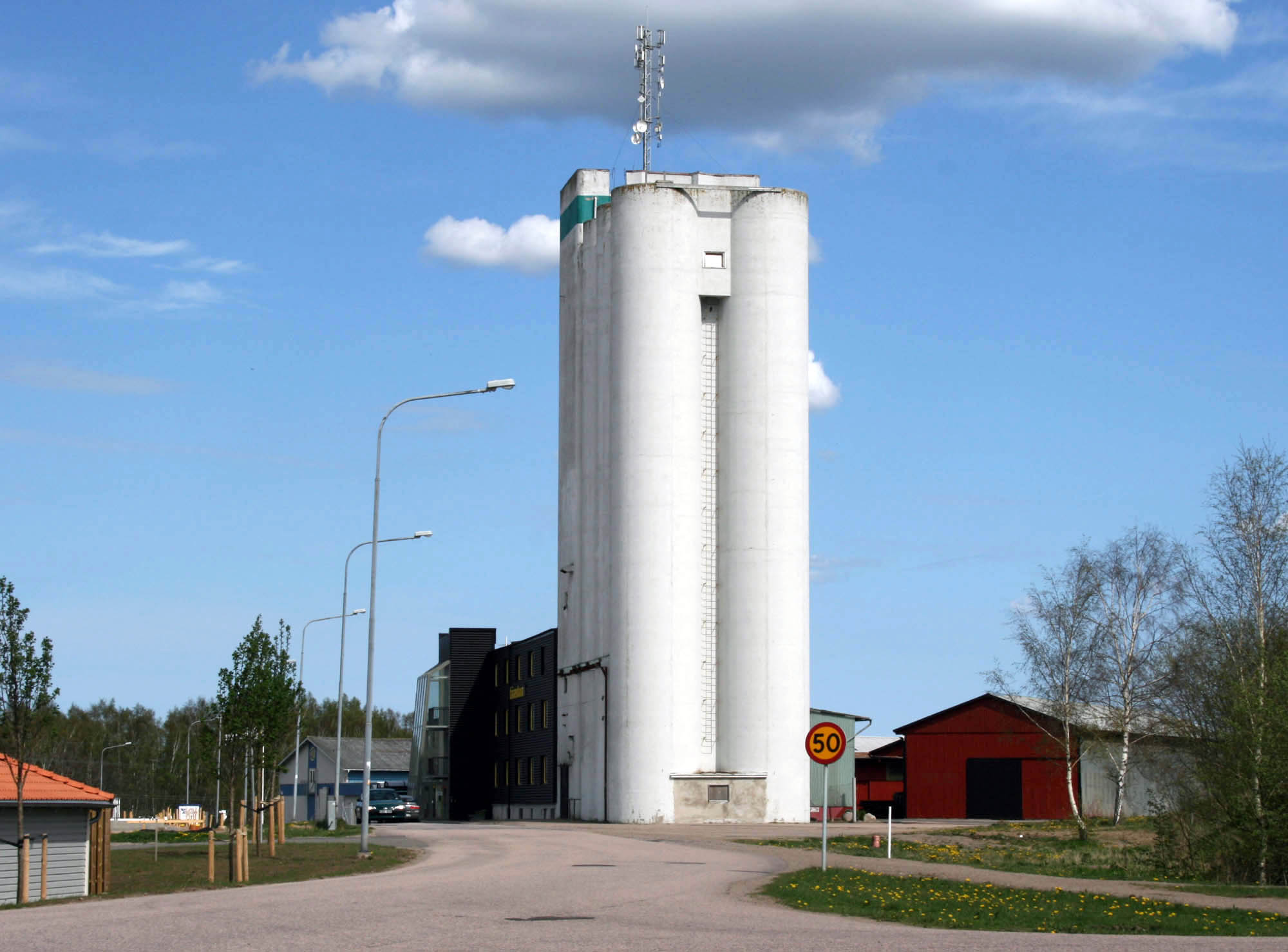
Silo

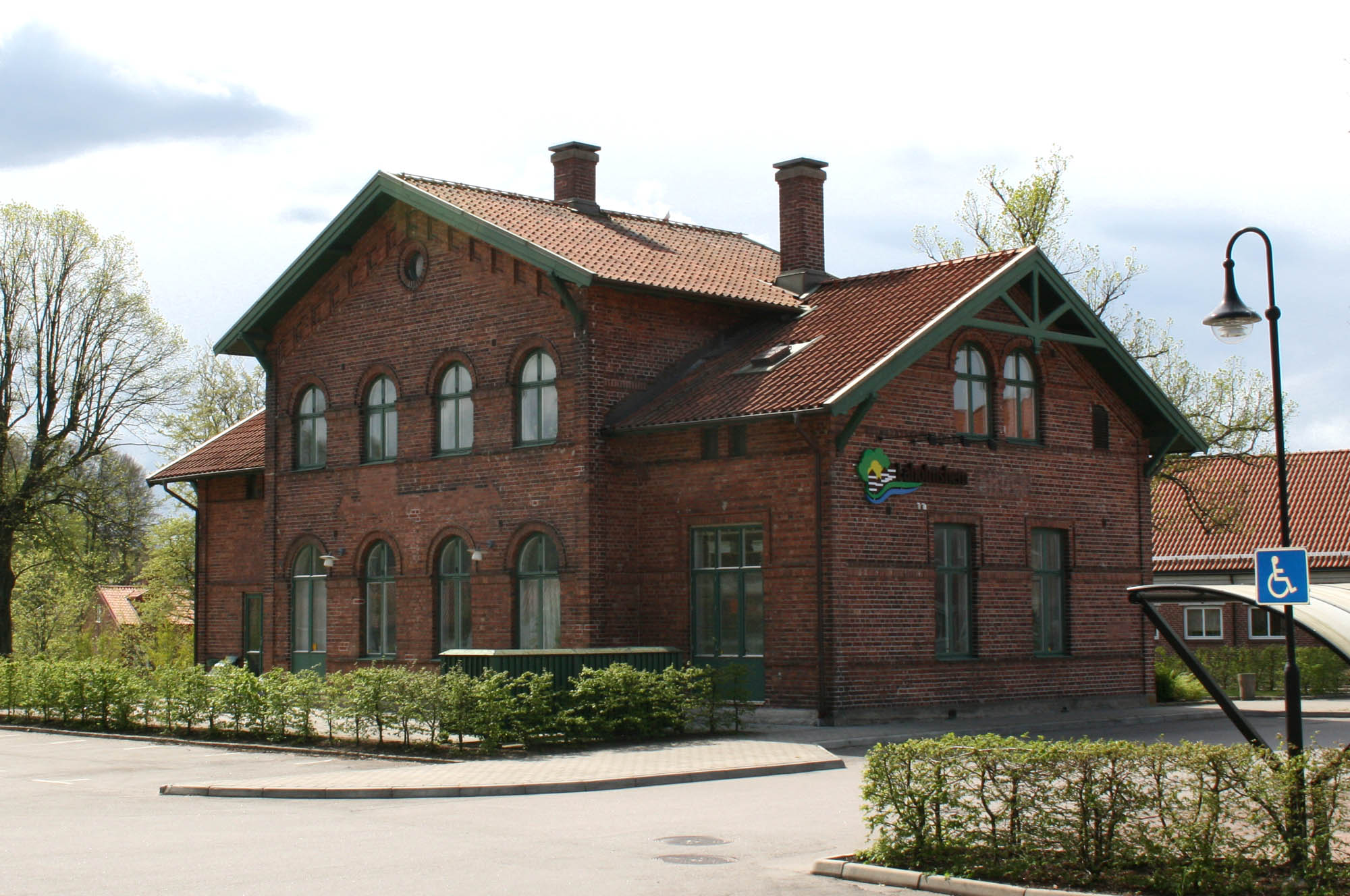
Old railway station

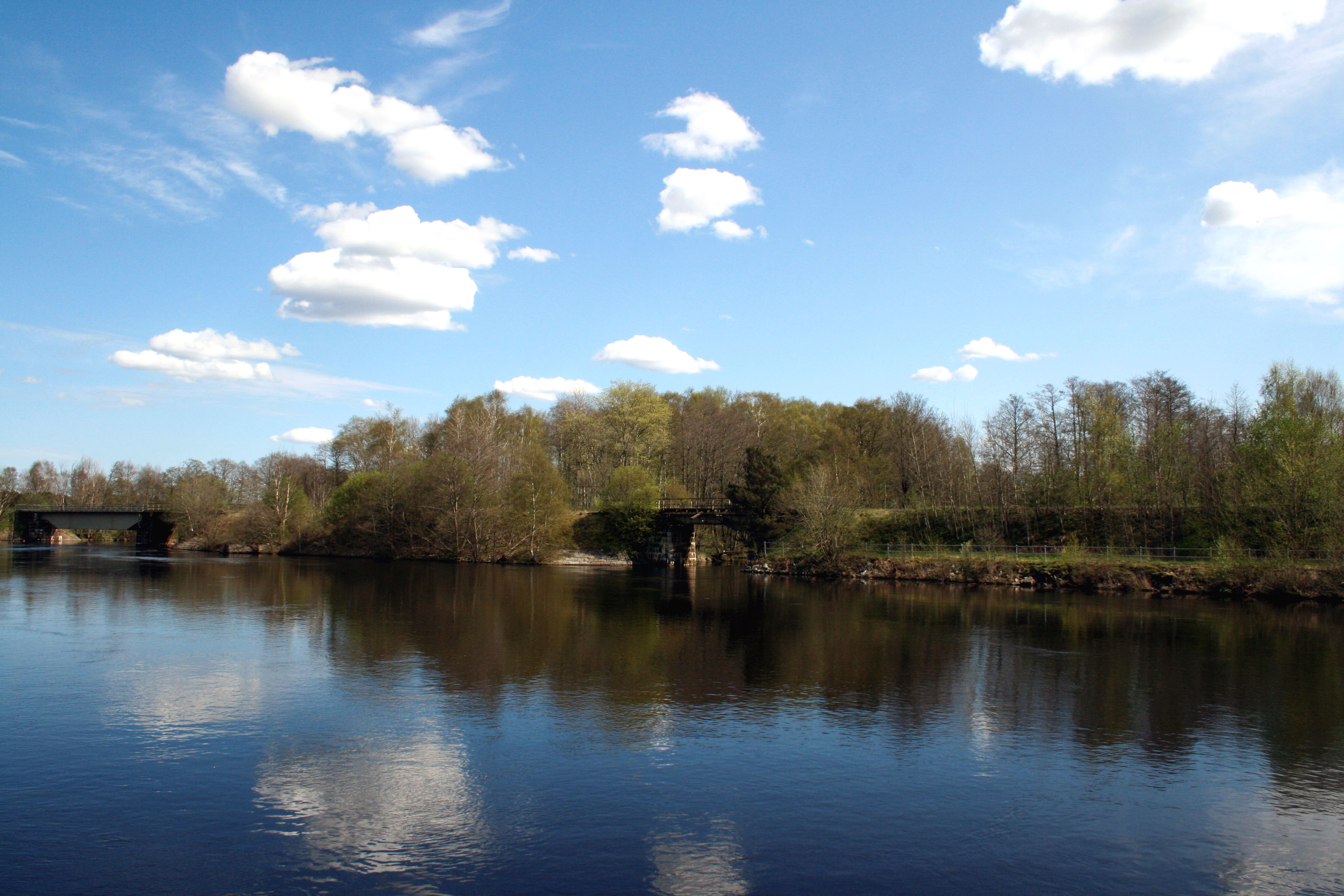
Old bridge

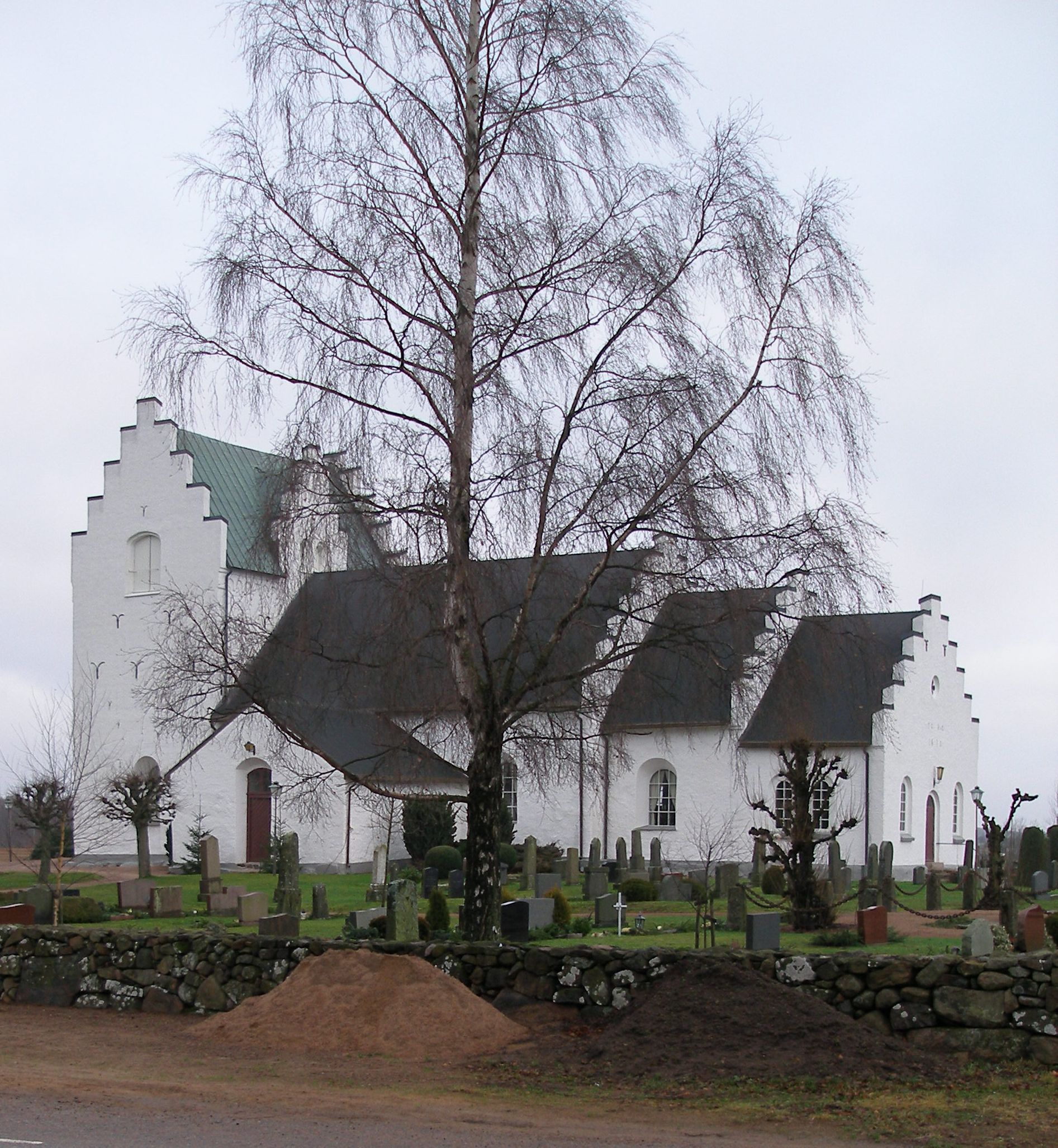
Church in Våxtorp
