= Hishult =

- Location within Halland Location within Sweden
- Coordinates: 56°25′33″N 13°18′43″E
- Country: Sweden
- Province: Halland
- County: Halland County
- Municipality: Laholm Municipality

Area
  - Total: 0.74 km^{2} (0.29 sq mi)

Population (31 December 2010)
  - Total: 332
  - Density: 449/km^{2} (1,160/sq mi)
- Time zone: UTC+1 (CET)
  - Summer (DST): UTC+2 (CEST)

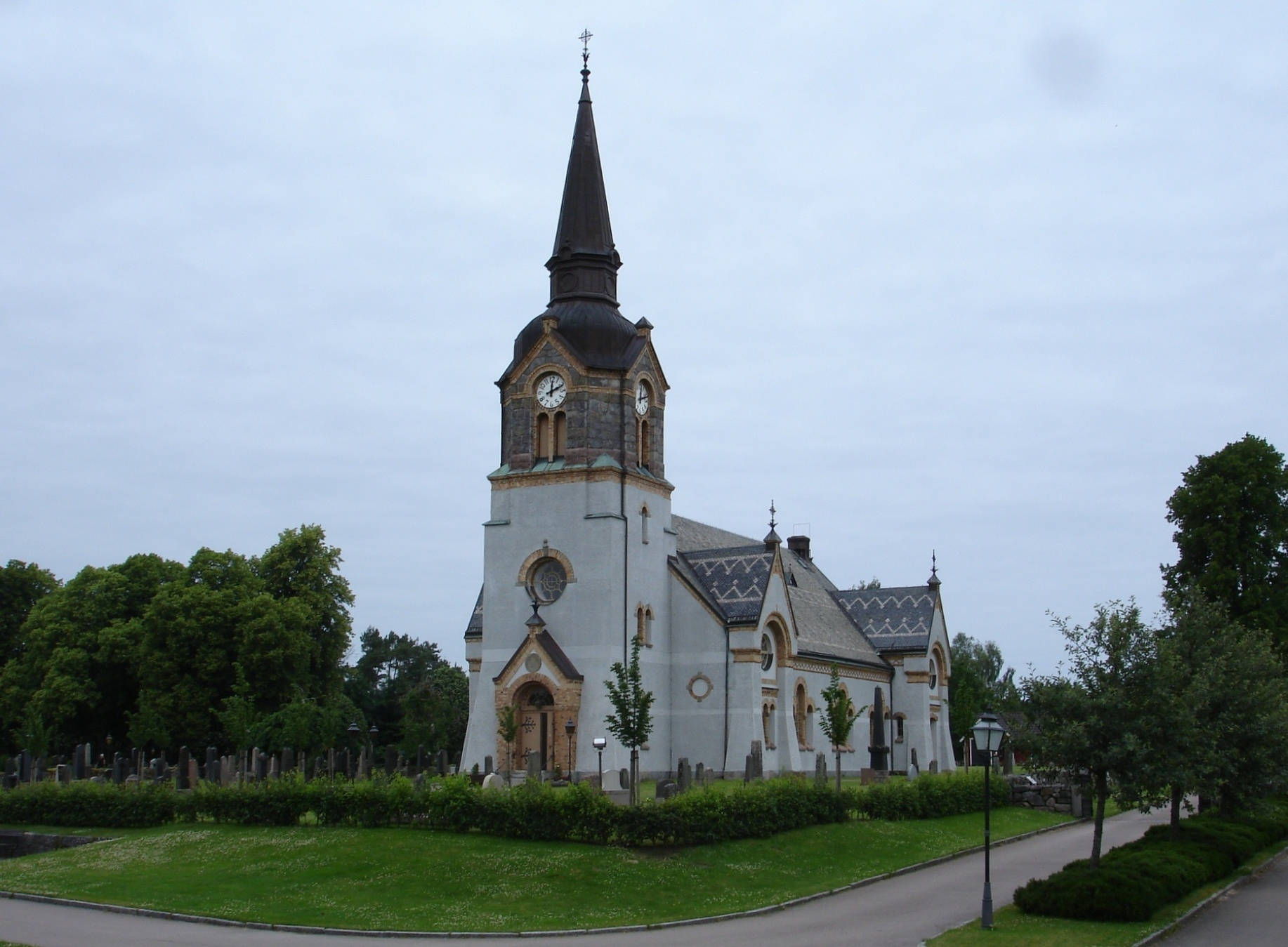
Hishult Church in Laholm Municipality, southeastern Halland

Hishult is a locality and a parish situated in Laholm Municipality, Halland County, Sweden with 332 inhabitants in 2010.

The area has been a centre of iron extraction and formed a county, including parts of northern Skåne while it was Danish. The name might be related to the iron extraction as it used to be spelt Isenhult which might mean iron forest.

Today it has a gallery of some reputation.
