= Skummeslövsstrand =

- Location within Halland Location within Sweden
- Coordinates: 56°27′40″N 12°55′19″E
- Country: Sweden
- Province: Halland
- County: Halland County
- Municipality: Laholm Municipality

Area
  - Total: 0.77 km^{2} (0.30 sq mi)

Population (31 December 2010)
  - Total: 491
  - Density: 635/km^{2} (1,640/sq mi)
- Time zone: UTC+1 (CET)
  - Summer (DST): UTC+2 (CEST)

Skummeslövsstrand is a locality situated in Laholm Municipality, Halland County, Sweden with 491 inhabitants in 2010.

It is a seaside resort on Sweden's west coast and has the country's longest beach (12 km).

SKUMMESLÖVSSTRAND is, with 17 letters, the longest name of any postal town in Sweden.
