= Laholm =

Place in Halland, Sweden

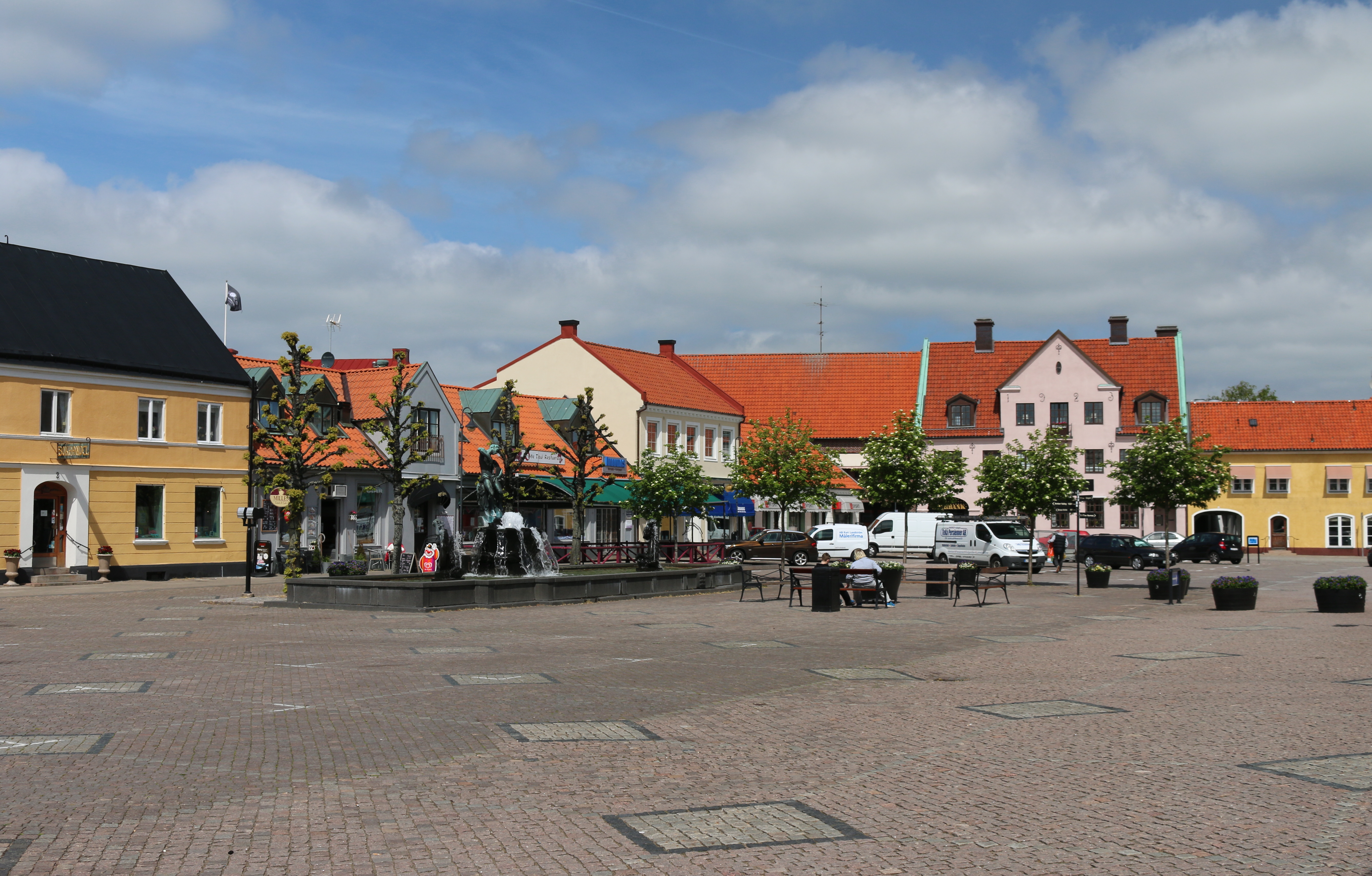
- Laholm City Square

- Coat of arms

- Location within Halland Location within Sweden
- Coordinates: 56°31′N 13°02′E
- Country: Sweden
- Province: Halland
- County: Halland County
- Municipality: Laholm Municipality

Area
  - Total: 4.66 km^{2} (1.80 sq mi)

Population (31 December 2015)
  - Total: 6,527
  - Density: 1,320/km^{2} (3,400/sq mi)
- Time zone: UTC+1 (CET)
  - Summer (DST): UTC+2 (CEST)
- Postal code: 312 00
- Area code: 430
- Website: www.laholm.se

Laholm (Swedish pronunciation: [laˈhɔlm]) is a town and the seat of Laholm Municipality, Halland County, Sweden, with 6,527 inhabitants in 2015.

Laholm is, despite its small population, for historical reasons often still referred to as a city. In the 13th century, Laholm was the first in Halland to receive city rights.

The town is located at the estuary of the river Lagan in the Bay of Laholm.

== History ==
Laholm is one of Sweden's oldest cities and the oldest in the province of Halland. The first charter was granted in the 13th century, in what was then a part of Denmark and Høx Herred. The church was founded in 1225. During the wars between Sweden and Denmark in the 16th and 17th century, Laholm was burnt down several times. In 1644, during the Torstenson War, Gustav Horn successfully besieged Laholm Castle. In 1645, as Halland became a part of Sweden, the town had 330 inhabitants, growing to about 866 about hundred years later. In the middle of the 19th century the population reached the 1,000 mark, doubled in the early 20th century and reaching 3,000 around 1950. The local government reform of 1971 made the town the seat of Laholm Municipality which has over 25,000 inhabitants.

The town's and commune's coat of arms dates back to the Middle Ages, but was granted by royal warrant only in the 1940s. It shows three silver salmon with red fins on a blue background, owing to the importance of salmon fishing in the area. The arms is very nearly identical to that of the Royal Borough of Kingston upon Thames in London, whose arms also go back a long way.

== Gallery ==
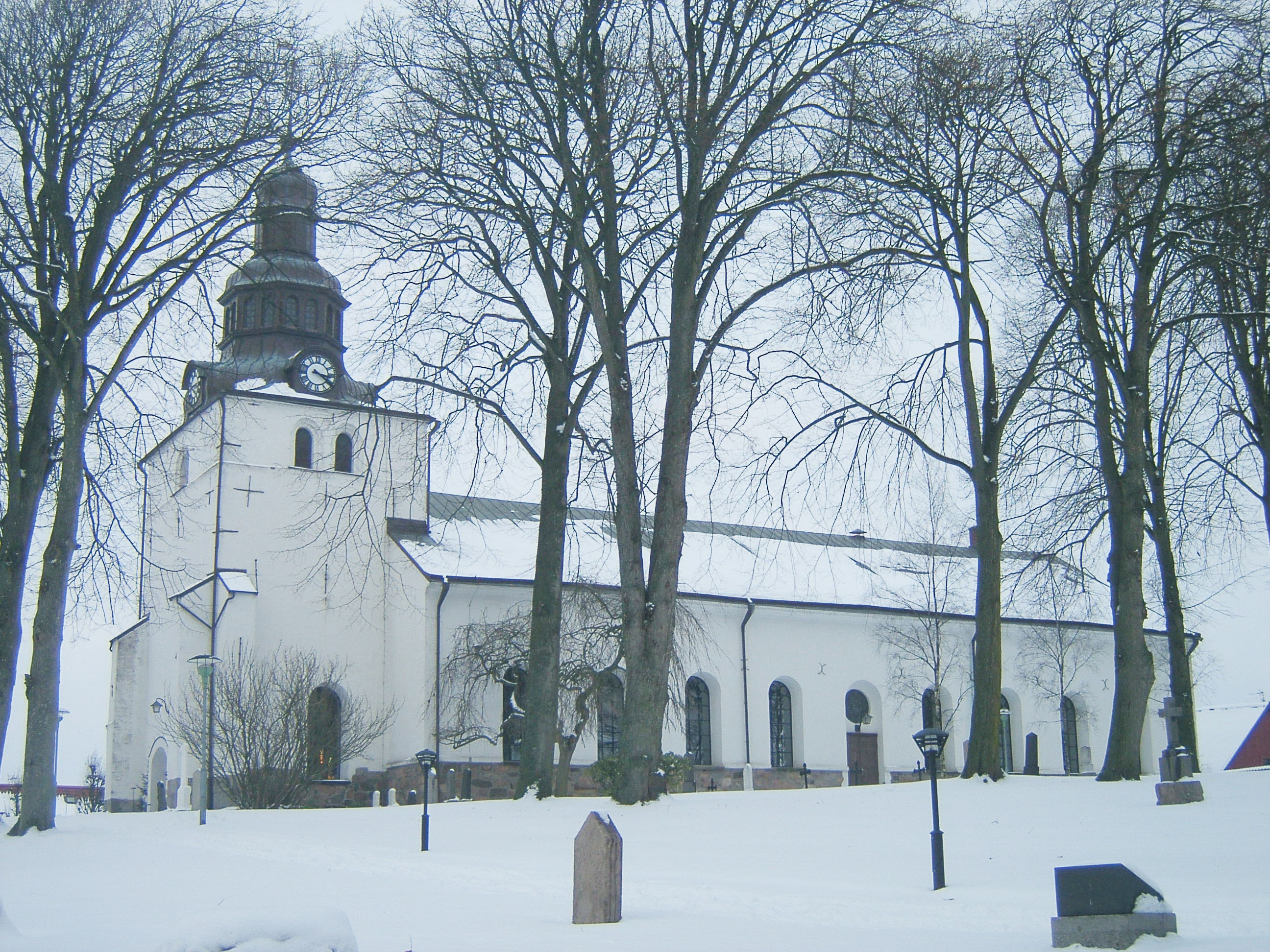
Church

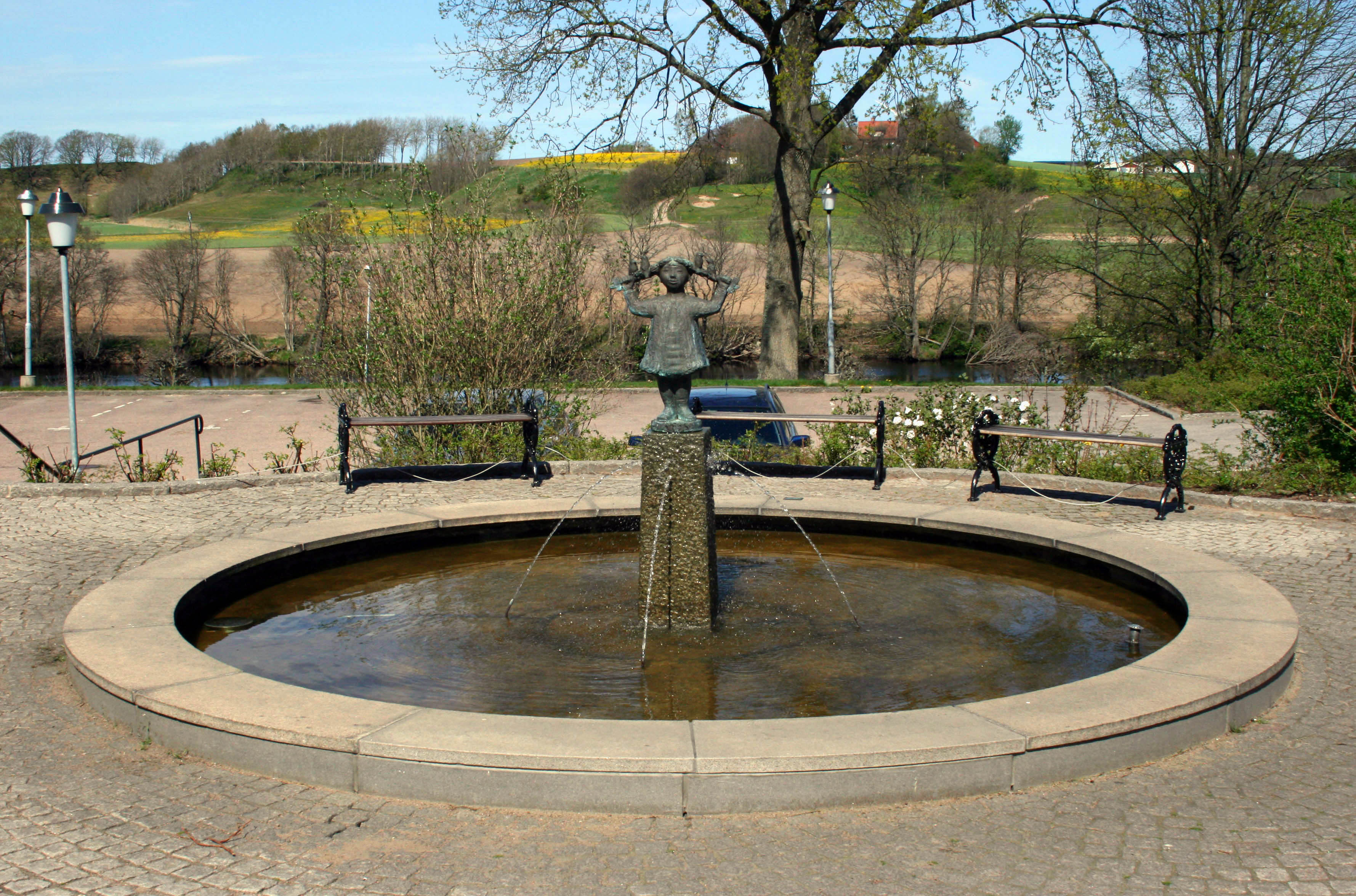
Fountain

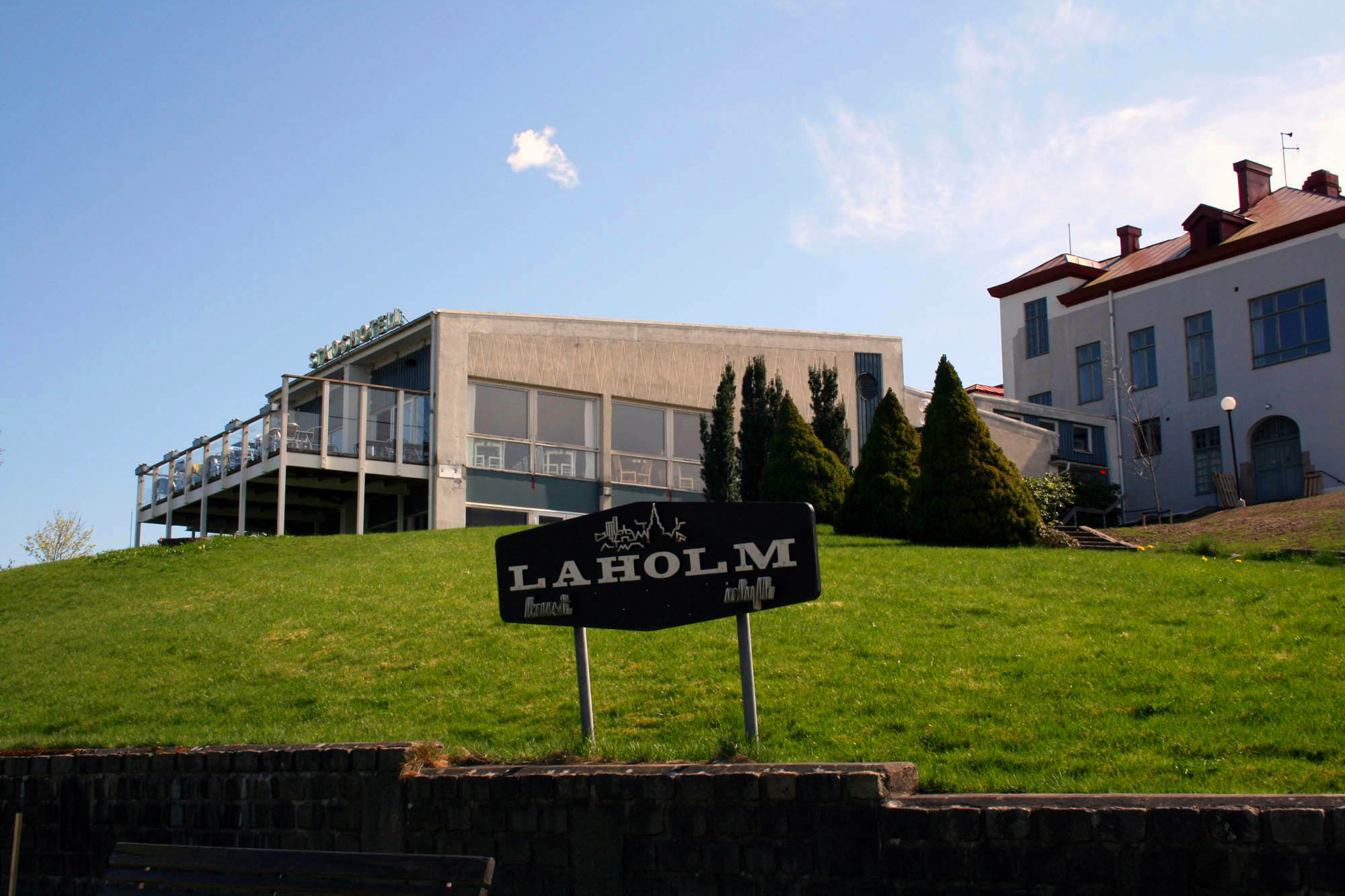
Back of the hotel and the restaurant Gröna Hästen.

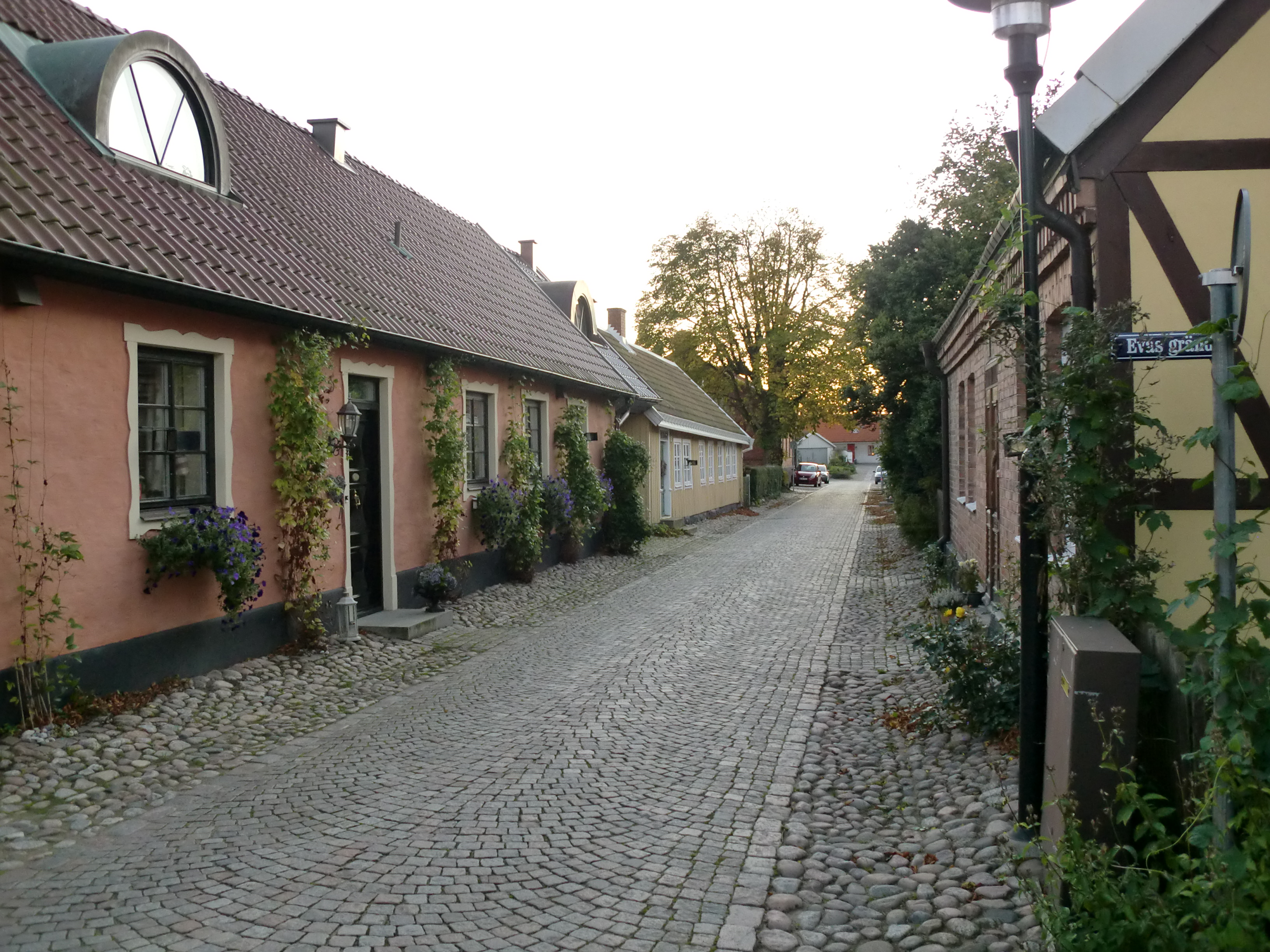
Gamleby (old town part)

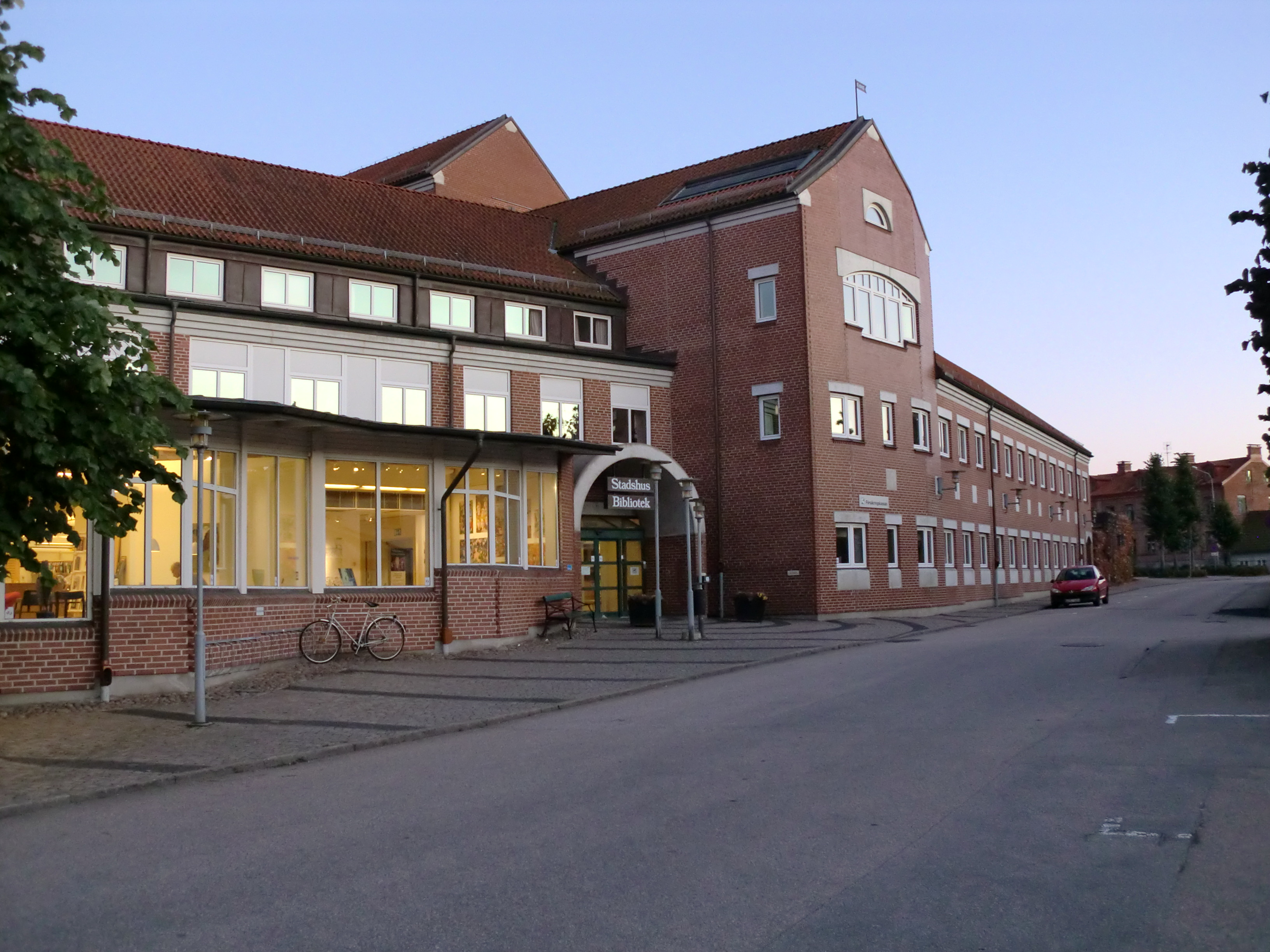
Town hall and public library

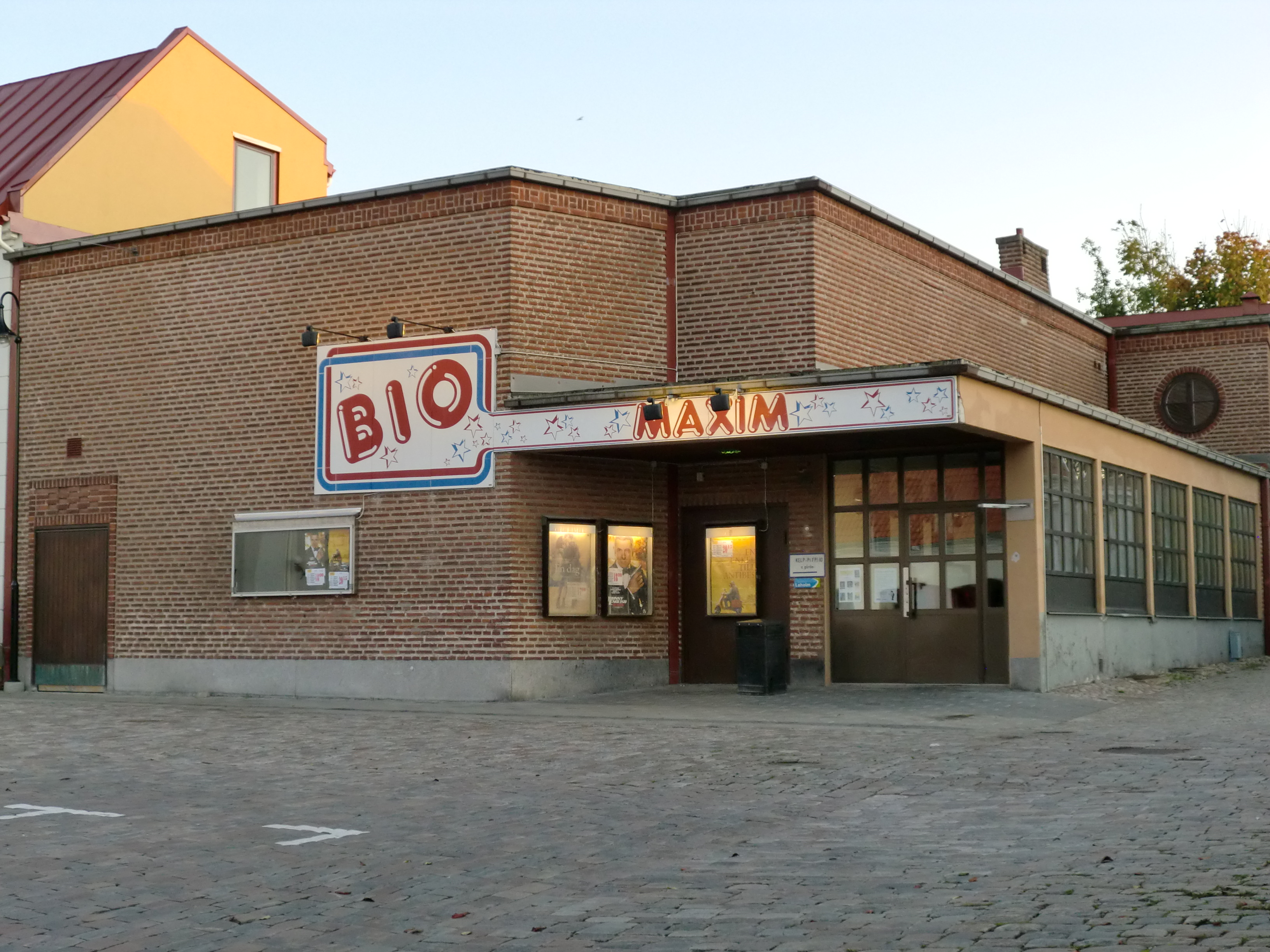
Biograf Maxim (movie theater)

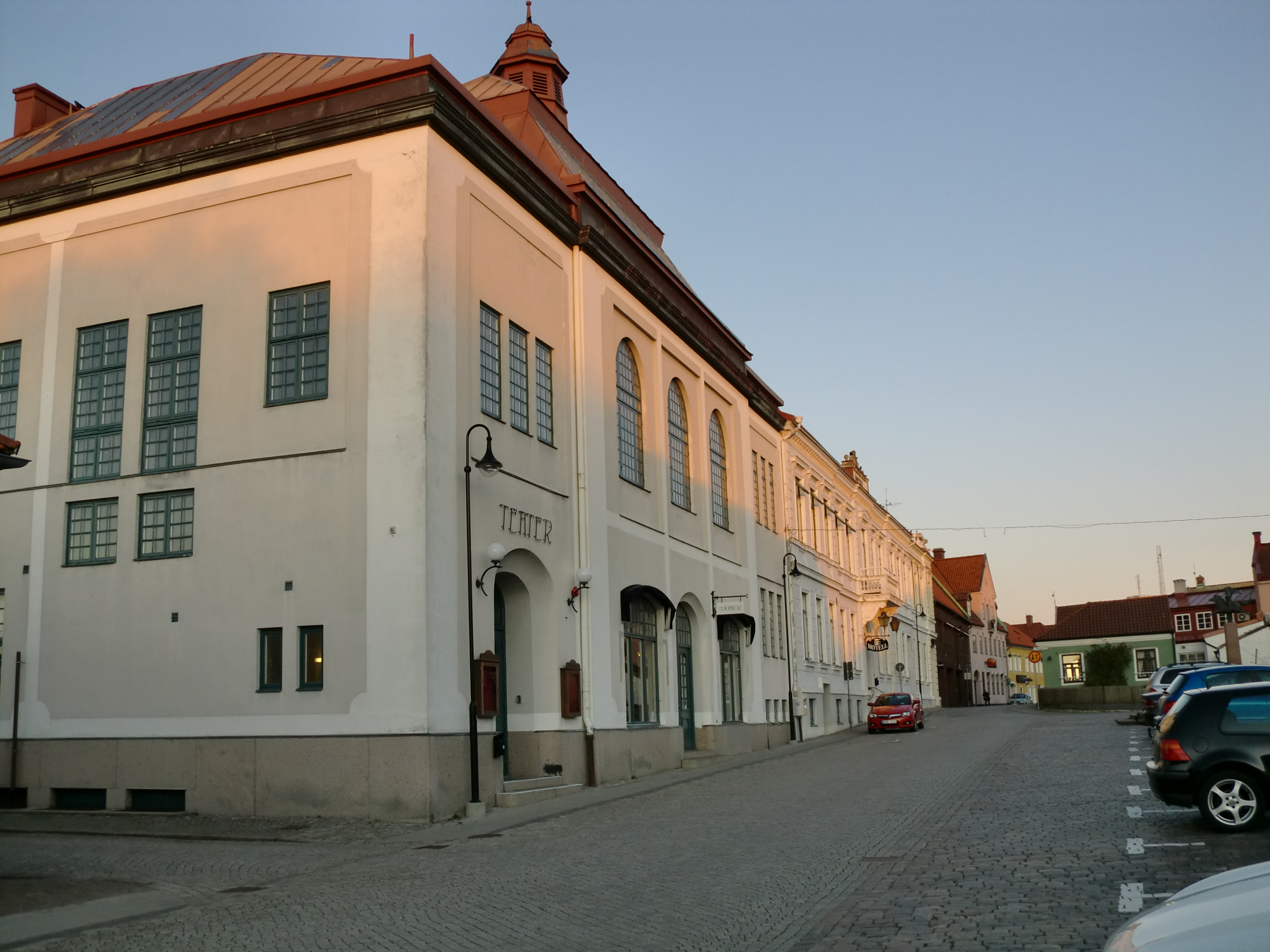
Theatre and hotel

== Works cited ==
- Vessberg, Vilhelm [in Swedish] (1895). Gustaf Horns fälttåg [Gustaf Horn's campaign]. Bidrag till historien om Sveriges krig med Danmark 1643–1645 (in Swedish). Vol. 1. Stockholm: Ivar Hæggströms Boktryckeri.
