= Hasslöv =

- Location within Halland Location within Sweden
- Coordinates: 56°25′N 13°00′E
- Country: Sweden
- Province: Halland
- County: Halland County
- Municipality: Laholm Municipality

Area
  - Total: 0.44 km^{2} (0.17 sq mi)

Population (31 December 2010)
  - Total: 228
  - Density: 515/km^{2} (1,330/sq mi)
- Time zone: UTC+1 (CET)
  - Summer (DST): UTC+2 (CEST)

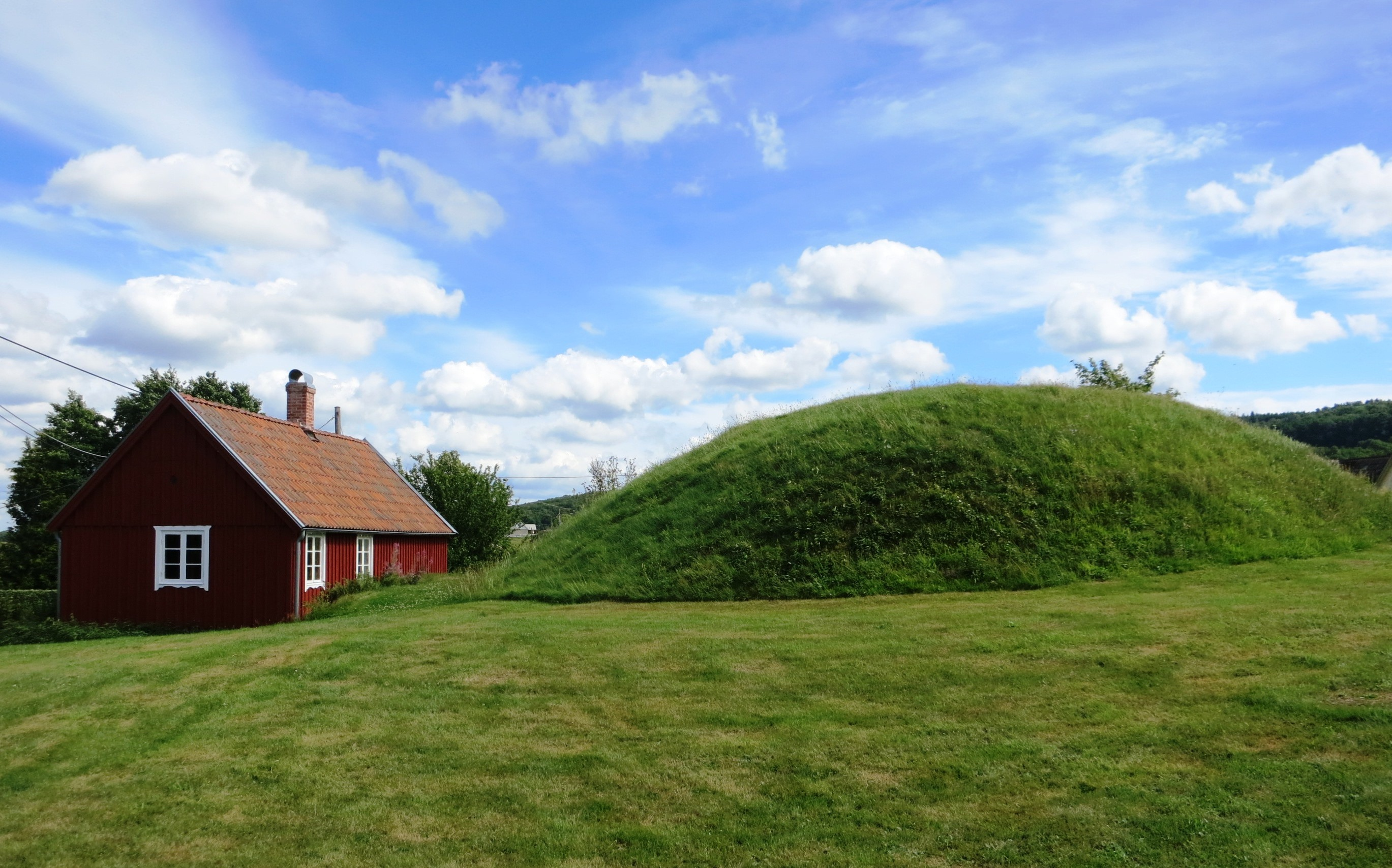
Lugnarohögen (burial mound) in Hasslöv in Laholm municipality

Hasslöv is a locality situated in Laholm Municipality, Halland County, Sweden with 228 inhabitants in 2010.
