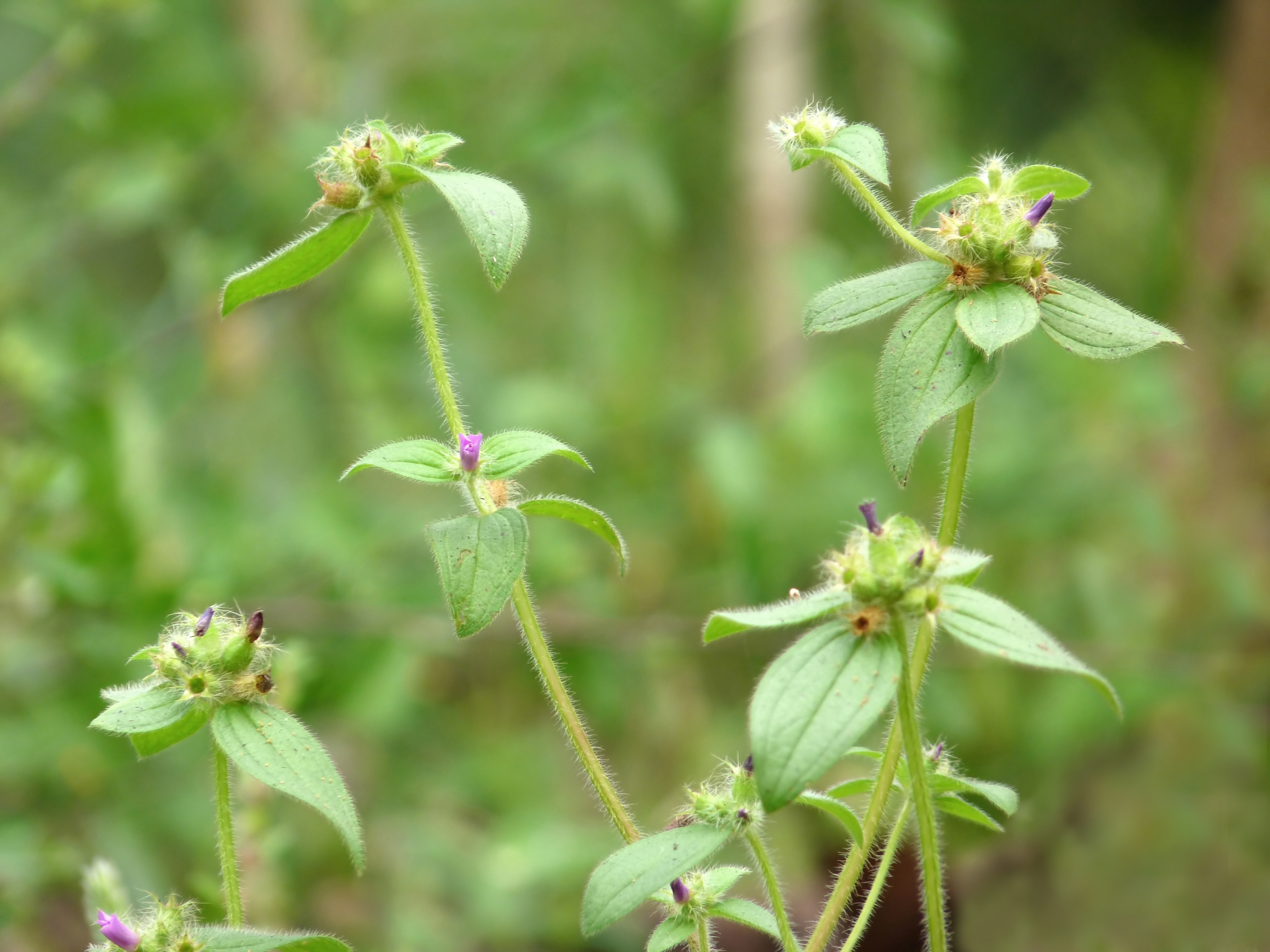
- Osbeckia muralis

Scientific classification
- Kingdom: Plantae
- Clade: Tracheophytes
- Clade: Angiosperms
- Clade: Eudicots
- Clade: Rosids
- Order: Myrtales
- Family: Melastomataceae
- Genus: Osbeckia; L.

Species
- See text

= Osbeckia =

Genus of flowering plants

Osbeckia is a genus of plants in the family Melastomataceae. It was named by Carl Linnaeus for the Swedish explorer and naturalist Pehr Osbeck (1723–1805).

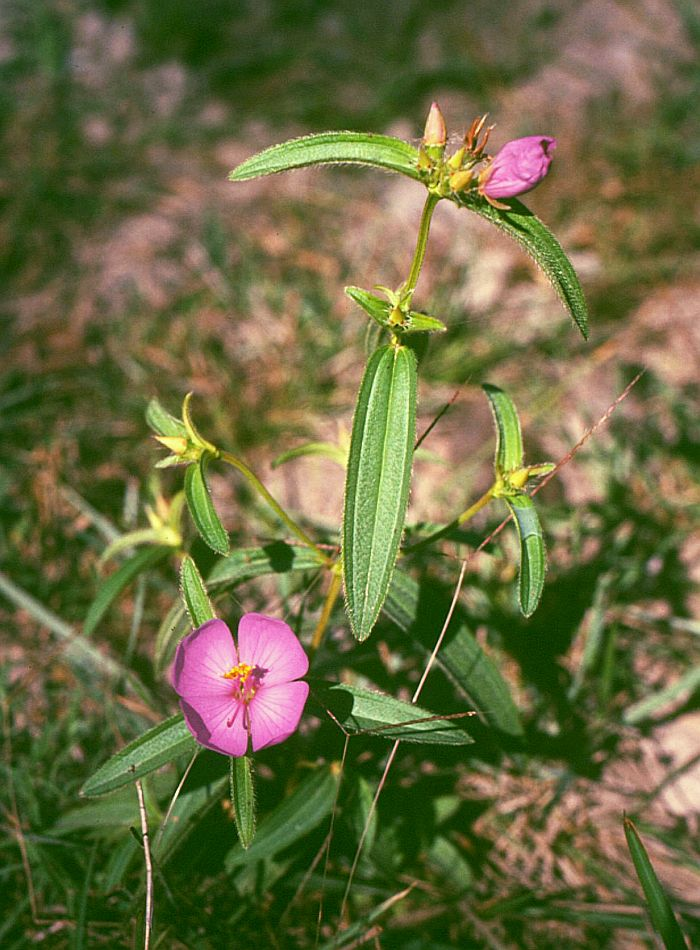
Osbeckia chinensis

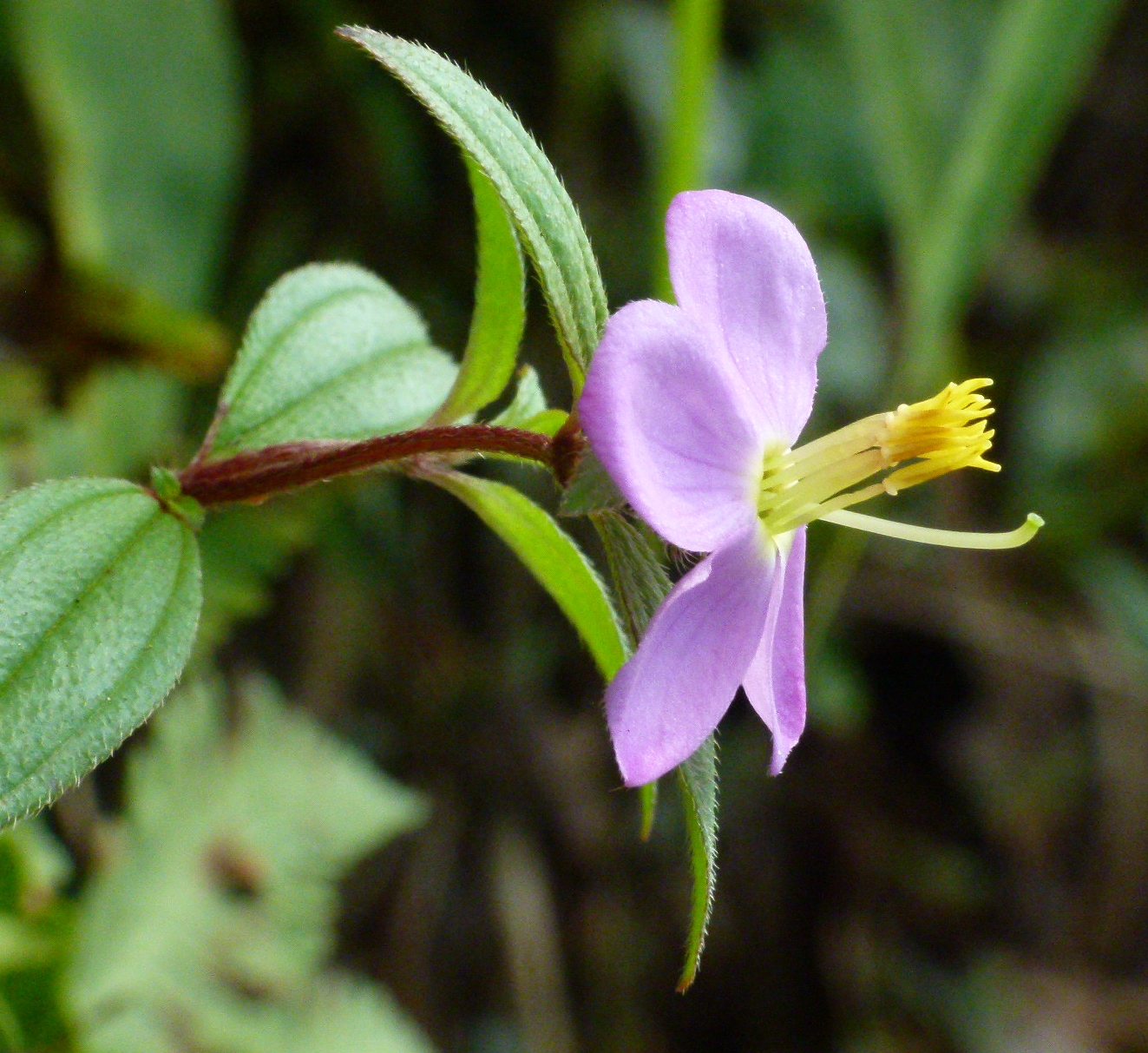
Profile of flower

== Distribution ==
Osbeckias are native to Eastern Asia — China, Japan, Malaysia, India, Sri Lanka and Australasia. Some species have been investigated as herbal remedies.

== Accepted species ==
The following 11 species are accepted botanical names.

- Osbeckia afzelii (Hook. f.) Cogn.
- Osbeckia capitata Benth. ex Naudin
- Osbeckia chinensis L.
- Osbeckia crinita Benth. ex C.B. Clarke
- Osbeckia decandra (Sm.) DC.
- Osbeckia nepalensis Hook. f.
- Osbeckia nutans Wall. ex C.B. Clarke
- Osbeckia porteresii Jacq.-Fél.
- Osbeckia praviantha Jacq.-Fél.
- Osbeckia stellata Buch.-Ham. ex Ker Gawl.
- Osbeckia tubulosa Sm.

== Unresolved species ==
Following botanical names are used in the texts, but categorized as Unresolved by The Plant List.

- Osbeckia aspera Bl.
- Osbeckia assamensis Jacq.-Fél.
- Osbeckia brachystemon Naudin
- Osbeckia calotricha A. Chev.
- Osbeckia capitata Benth. ex Walp.
- Osbeckia ciliaris Ser. ex DC.
- Osbeckia cogniauxiana De Wild.
- Osbeckia crepiniana Cogn.
- Osbeckia cupularis D. Don ex Wight & Arn.
- Osbeckia elliptica Naudin
- Osbeckia incana E. Mey. ex Hochst.
- Osbeckia lanata Alston
- Osbeckia leschnaultiana DC.
- Osbeckia liberica Stapf
- Osbeckia mehrana Giri & Nayar
- Osbeckia muralis Naudin
- Osbeckia octandra DC.
- Osbeckia porteresii Jacq.-Fél.
- Osbeckia praviantha Jacq.-Fél.
- Osbeckia pusilla De Wild.
- Osbeckia reticulata Bedd.
- Osbeckia rubicunda Arn.
- Osbeckia septemnervia Ham. ex Craib
- Osbeckia tubulosa Sm.
- Osbeckia umlaasiana Hochst.
- Osbeckia virgata D. Don ex Wight & Arn.
- Osbeckia wattii Craib
- Osbeckia wynaadensis C.B. Clarke
- Osbeckia zeylanica Steud. ex Naudin
