= Results of the 1952 Swedish general election =

Sweden held a general election on 21 September 1952.

== Results ==
Party	Votes	%	Seats	+/–
Swedish Social Democratic Party	1,742,284	46.05	110	–2
People's Party	924,819	24.44	58	+1
Right Party	543,825	14.37	31	+8
Farmers' League	406,183	10.74	26	–4
Communist Party	164,194	4.34	5	–3
Left Socialist Party	2,302	0.06	0	0
Other parties	100	0.00	0	0
Total	3,783,707	100.00	230	0
Valid votes	3,783,707	99.54		
Invalid/blank votes	17,577	0.46		
Total votes	3,801,284	100.00		
Registered voters/turnout	4,805,216	79.11		
Source: Nohlen & Stöver

== Regional results ==
=== Percentage share ===
Location	Share	Votes	S	FP	H	B	K	Other	Left	Right
Götaland	47.5	1,841,051	43.5	23.7	16.1	13.5	3.1	0.1	46.6	53.3
Svealand	35.7	1,350,603	47.1	27.9	13.6	6.7	4.7	0.0	51.9	48.1
Norrland	15.6	592,053	51.6	19.0	10.6	11.6	7.3	0.0	58.9	41.1
Total	100.0	3,873,707	46.0	24.4	14.4	10.7	4.3	0.1	50.4	49.6
Source: SCB

=== By votes ===
Location	Share	Votes	S	FP	H	B	K	Other	Left	Right
Götaland	47.5	1,841,051	800,348	436,245	297,245	247,765	57,118	2,330	857,466	981,255
Svealand	35.7	1,350,603	636,607	376,156	184,071	89,876	63,839	54	700,446	650,103
Norrland	15.6	592,053	305,329	112,418	62,509	68,542	43,237	18	348,566	243,469
Total	100.0	3,873,707	1,742,284	924,819	543,825	406,183	164,194	2,402	1,906,478	1,874,827
Source: SCB

== Constituency results ==
=== Percentage share ===
Location	Land	Share	Votes	S	FP	H	B	K	Other	Left	Right	Margin
Location		%		%	%	%	%	%	%	%	%	
Blekinge	G	1.9	71,943	46.2	28.4	12.3	10.3	2.8	0.0	49.0	51.0	1,401
Bohuslän	G	2.8	105,583	39.9	31.9	13.2	11.5	3.5	0.0	43.4	56.6	13,866
Gothenburg	G	5.4	204,150	35.8	40.9	10.8	0.2	11.2	1.1	47.0	51.9	9,891
Gotland	G	0.8	30,156	35.8	19.1	15.9	29.1	0.1	0.0	36.0	64.0	8,467
Gävleborg	N	3.8	144,806	53.9	19.4	7.6	11.2	7.9	0.0	61.8	38.2	34,222
Halland	G	2.3	88,631	38.5	18.3	13.9	27.4	1.9	0.0	40.4	59.6	16,938
Jämtland	N	1.9	71,609	53.8	14.3	17.1	14.8	0.0	0.0	53.8	46.2	5,430
Jönköping	G	4.0	149,857	41.0	26.1	14.2	16.6	2.1	0.0	43.1	56.9	20,754
Kalmar	G	3.2	120,701	44.6	13.4	20.5	19.2	2.3	0.0	46.9	53.1	7,390
Kopparberg	S	3.6	136,075	51.8	22.6	10.0	12.0	3.6	0.0	55.4	44.6	14,630
Kristianstad	G	3.5	133,920	43.0	21.7	17.6	17.7	0.0	0.0	43.0	57.0	18,769
Kronoberg	G	2.2	81,853	39.9	16.2	18.4	22.3	3.2	0.0	43.1	56.9	11,226
Malmö area	G	5.1	191,829	53.9	19.3	24.4	0.3	2.1	0.0	56.0	44.0	23,120
Malmöhus	G	3.8	144,083	49.8	17.7	12.3	19.8	0.4	0.0	50.2	49.8	578
Norrbotten	N	2.9	110,214	50.0	11.9	12.1	8.7	17.3	0.0	67.3	32.7	38,139
Skaraborg	G	3.5	132,273	35.9	27.0	15.7	19.5	1.9	0.0	37.7	62.3	32,523
Stockholm	S	11.4	431,880	38.8	36.3	18.2	0.2	6.5	0.0	45.3	54.7	40,602
Stockholm County	S	5.1	191,303	44.4	29.7	15.6	5.3	5.0	0.0	49.4	50.6	2,443
Södermanland	S	3.2	120,426	55.0	23.2	9.5	10.7	1.6	0.0	56.6	43.4	15,888
Uppsala	S	2.2	82,328	48.3	23.3	13.7	12.7	2.0	0.0	50.3	49.7	500
Värmland	S	4.0	149,764	52.2	19.9	12.1	10.2	5.6	0.0	57.8	42.2	23,359
Västerbotten	N	3.0	115,309	46.0	28.2	11.9	11.9	2.0	0.0	48.1	51.9	4,483
Västernorrland	N	4.0	150,115	53.7	18.9	8.2	12.3	6.9	0.0	60.6	39.4	31,789
Västmanland	S	2.8	105,703	56.1	20.6	8.0	11.6	3.7	0.0	59.8	40.2	20,759
Älvsborg N	G	2.7	103,321	41.4	28.1	12.0	16.2	2.3	0.0	43.7	56.3	13,070
Älvsborg S	G	2.5	93,064	39.9	17.9	25.0	14.3	2.9	0.0	42.9	57.1	13,301
Örebro	S	3.5	133,124	52.6	24.9	9.6	8.7	4.2	0.0	56.9	43.1	18,252
Östergötland	G	5.0	189,687	52.2	18.6	15.7	10.4	3.1	0.0	55.3	44.7	20,109
Total		100.0	3,873,707	46.0	24.4	14.4	10.7	4.3	0.1	50.4	49.6	31,651
Source: SCB

=== By votes ===
Location	Land	Share	Votes	S	FP	H	B	K	Other	Left	Right	Margin
Location		%										
Blekinge	G	1.9	71,943	33,247	20,390	8,850	7,432	2,024		35,271	36,672	1,401
Bohuslän	G	2.8	105,583	42,169	33,706	13,894	12,124	3,689	1	45,858	59,724	13,866
Gothenburg	G	5.4	204,150	73,149	83,499	22,039	330	22,828	2,305	95,977	105,868	9,891
Gotland	G	0.8	30,156	10,803	5,740	4,791	8,779	40	3	10,843	19,310	8,467
Gävleborg	N	3.8	144,806	78,019	28,156	10,967	16,168	11,494	2	89,513	55,291	34,222
Halland	G	2.3	88,631	34,149	16,202	12,348	24,233	1,696	3	35,845	52,783	16,938
Jämtland	N	1.9	71,609	38,516	10,266	12,233	10,589	2	3	38,518	33,088	5,430
Jönköping	G	4.0	149,857	61,433	39,136	21,343	24,826	3,118	1	64,551	85,305	20,754
Kalmar	G	3.2	120,701	53,847	16,107	24,725	23,213	2,808	1	56,655	64,045	7,390
Kopparberg	S	3.6	136,075	70,423	30,703	13,672	16,346	4,928	3	75,351	60,721	14,630
Kristianstad	G	3.5	133,920	57,572	29,085	23,515	23,744	3	1	57,575	76,344	18,769
Kronoberg	G	2.2	81,853	32,695	13,270	15,061	18,208	2,618	1	35,313	46,539	11,226
Malmö area	G	5.1	191,829	103,337	36,978	46,750	626	4,137	1	107,474	84,354	23,120
Malmöhus	G	3.8	144,083	71,684	25,481	17,674	28,593	642	9	72,326	71,748	578
Norrbotten	N	2.9	110,214	55,148	13,052	13,354	9,628	19,025	7	74,173	36,034	38,139
Skaraborg	G	3.5	132,273	47,423	35,722	20,817	25,859	2,452		49,875	82,398	32,523
Stockholm	S	11.4	431,880	167,709	156,768	78,559	896	27,912	36	195,621	236,223	40,602
Stockholm County	S	5.1	191,303	84,899	56,813	29,866	10,194	9,531		94,430	96,873	2,443
Södermanland	S	3.2	120,426	66,262	27,962	11,376	12,930	1,894	2	68,156	52,268	15,888
Uppsala	S	2.2	82,328	39,763	19,148	11,289	10,475	1,649	4	41,412	40,912	500
Värmland	S	4.0	149,764	78,167	29,872	18,060	15,269	8,393	3	86,560	63,201	23,359
Västerbotten	N	3.0	115,309	53,059	32,559	13,660	13,675	2,352	4	55,411	59,894	4,483
Västernorrland	N	4.0	150,115	80,587	28,385	12,295	18,482	10,364	2	90,951	59,162	31,789
Västmanland	S	2.8	105,703	59,330	21,767	8,468	12,235	3,899	4	63,229	42,470	20,759
Älvsborg N	G	2.7	103,321	42,750	29,010	12,430	16,754	2,374	3	45,124	58,194	13,070
Älvsborg S	G	2.5	93,064	37,164	16,642	23,272	13,268	2,717	1	39,881	53,182	13,301
Örebro	S	3.5	133,124	70,054	33,123	12,781	11,531	5,633	2	75,687	57,435	18,252
Östergötland	G	5.0	189,687	98,926	35,277	29,736	19,776	5,972		104,898	84,789	20,109
Total		100.0	3,783,707	1,742,284	924,819	543,825	406,183	164,194	2,402	1,906,478	1,874,827	31,651
Source: SCB

== Results by cities and rural municipalities ==
Since hundreds ceased in time for the 1952 election, results were counted in smaller municipalities instead. Since those rural municipality lists would take up too much space, this lists the cities one by one and the overall rural municipality vote in one chart for each constituency.

=== Blekinge ===
Location	Share	Votes	S	FP	H	B	K	Left	Right
Karlshamn	7.6	5,484	49.9	26.5	20.5	0.9	2.3	52.2	47.8
Karlskrona	21.9	15,726	44.8	43.7	9.1	0.2	2.1	47.0	53.0
Ronneby	5.3	3,816	54.6	31.4	11.0	0.6	2.5	57.0	43.0
Sölvesborg	4.3	3,081	53.5	23.0	18.2	0.9	4.3	57.8	42.2
Rural vote	58.4	41,995	45.8	22.5	11.4	17.2	3.2	48.9	51.1
Postal vote	2.6	1,841	27.7	37.9	29.2	4.5	0.8	28.5	71.5
Total	1.9	71,943	46.2	28.4	12.3	10.3	2.8	49.0	51.0
Source: SCB

=== Gothenburg and Bohuslän ===
==== Bohuslän ====
Location	Share	Votes	S	FP	H	B	K	Left	Right
Kungälv	2.4	2,581	50.3	27.8	12.4	4.3	5.2	55.5	44.5
Lysekil	4.2	4,408	59.9	21.2	13.0	2.7	3.3	63.2	36.8
Marstrand	0.6	589	30.7	53.3	14.4	0.0	1.5	32.3	67.7
Mölndal	10.4	11,020	47.5	32.0	4.6	1.4	14.5	62.0	38.0
Strömstad	1.6	1,702	48.6	32.7	16.6	0.4	1.6	50.3	49.7
Uddevalla	12.4	13,071	56.4	28.4	11.5	1.7	1.9	58.3	41.7
Rural vote	66.5	70,180	34.2	33.1	14.4	16.3	2.1	36.3	63.7
Postal vote	1.9	2,032							
Total	2.8	105,583	39.9	31.9	13.2	11.5	3.5	43.4	56.6
Source: SCB

==== Gothenburg ====
Location	Share	Votes	S	FP	H	B	K	Left	Right
Gothenburg	100.0	204,150	35.8	40.9	10.8	0.2	11.2	47.0	51.9
Total	5.4	204,150	35.8	40.9	10.8	0.2	11.2	47.0	51.9
Source: SCB

=== Gotland ===
Location	Share	Votes	S	FP	H	B	K	Left	Right
Visby	23.6	7,125	49.3	21.8	26.0	2.9	0.0	49.3	50.7
Rural vote	74.0	22,322	31.8	17.9	12.1	38.0	0.2	31.9	68.1
Postal vote	2.4	709							
Total	0.8	30,156	35.8	19.1	15.9	29.1	0.1	36.0	64.0
Source: SCB

=== Gävleborg ===
Location	Share	Votes	S	FP	H	B	K	Left	Right
Bollnäs	2.0	2,954	54.9	29.4	10.2	1.3	4.3	59.1	40.9
Gävle	17.2	24,969	56.6	27.6	12.7	0.2	3.0	59.6	40.4
Hudiksvall	3.3	4,752	43.0	28.1	11.9	4.4	12.6	55.6	44.4
Sandviken	7.4	10,787	69.9	15.0	6.7	0.3	8.1	78.0	22.0
Söderhamn	4.2	6,021	55.5	21.4	11.7	0.3	11.1	66.6	33.4
Rural vote	63.5	91,897	52.2	16.6	5.1	17.0	9.1	61.3	38.7
Postal vote	2.4	3,426							
Total	3.8	144,806	53.9	19.4	7.6	11.2	7.9	61.8	38.2
Source: SCB

=== Halland ===
Location	Share	Votes	S	FP	H	B	K	Left	Right
Falkenberg	6.0	5,321	52.7	20.8	16.7	8.9	1.0	53.7	46.3
Halmstad	21.1	18,717	51.7	25.8	15.5	1.3	5.7	57.3	42.7
Kungsbacka	1.9	1,724	38.9	31.6	26.1	2.0	1.4	40.3	59.7
Laholm	1.8	1,633	45.7	22.6	17.5	13.9	0.2	46.0	54.0
Varberg	7.3	6,490	52.7	27.8	14.2	1.8	3.6	56.3	43.7
Rural vote	59.4	52,685	31.0	13.2	11.7	43.6	0.6	31.6	68.4
Postal vote	2.3	2,061							
Total	2.3	88,631	38.5	18.3	13.9	27.4	1.9	40.4	59.6
Source: SCB

=== Jämtland ===
Location	Share	Votes	S	FP	H	B	Left	Right
Östersund	15.2	10,880	46.9	20.2	30.4	2.5	46.9	53.1
Rural vote	81.7	58,521	55.4	13.2	14.1	17.3	55.4	36.5
Postal vote	3.1	2,208						
Total	1.9	71,609	53.8	14.3	17.1	14.8	53.8	46.2
Source: SCB

=== Jönköping ===
Location	Share	Votes	S	FP	H	B	K	Left	Right
Eksjö	3.4	5,144	44.5	29.0	18.6	7.9	0.0	44.5	55.5
Gränna	1.1	1,709	32.7	30.8	19.3	16.0	1.2	33.9	66.1
Huskvarna	4.7	7,102	59.0	24.0	9.0	0.2	7.7	66.7	33.3
Jönköping	15.4	23,004	47.7	29.6	18.7	1.6	2.4	50.1	49.9
Nässjö	5.8	8,710	53.1	25.9	14.1	4.2	2.6	55.7	44.3
Sävsjö	1.7	2,483	40.8	22.5	17.8	15.7	3.2	44.0	56.0
Tranås	5.0	7,433	50.8	25.8	16.3	5.3	1.8	52.6	47.4
Vetlanda	2.5	3,766	48.4	27.8	17.9	1.9	4.1	52.5	47.5
Värnamo	4.0	6,067	47.9	24.4	15.0	8.8	3.9	51.8	48.2
Rural vote	53.6	80,280	34.9	24.9	11.7	27.1	1.4	36.3	63.7
Postal vote	2.8	4,159							
Total	4.0	149,857	41.0	26.1	14.2	16.6	2.1	43.1	56.9
Source: SCB

=== Kalmar ===
Location	Share	Votes	S	FP	H	B	K	Left	Right
Borgholm	1.0	1,185	44.4	30.3	22.2	1.7	1.4	45.8	54.2
Kalmar	11.7	14,131	52.1	19.4	24.1	1.0	3.3	55.4	44.6
Nybro	3.1	3,731	56.5	18.3	17.7	1.6	5.9	62.4	37.6
Oskarshamn	4.6	5,581	57.7	19.6	20.4	0.3	2.0	59.7	40.3
Vimmerby	1.9	2,328	47.9	22.9	21.4	7.1	0.7	48.6	51.4
Västervik	5.4	6,525	47.9	19.5	26.6	1.0	5.1	53.0	47.0
Rural vote	69.9	84,364	42.1	10.5	18.9	26.6	1.9	44.0	56.0
Postal vote	2.4	2,856							
Total	3.3	120,701	44.6	13.4	20.5	19.2	2.3	46.9	53.1
Source: SCB

=== Kopparberg ===
Location	Share	Votes	S	FP	H	B	K	Left	Right
Avesta	3.3	4,456	63.0	18.7	7.4	0.2	10.7	73.7	26.3
Borlänge	8.8	11,989	65.0	20.9	8.3	1.5	4.3	69.3	30.7
Falun	6.2	8,422	41.8	33.9	22.9	0.4	1.0	42.8	57.2
Hedemora	2.0	2,708	49.2	29.1	16.4	2.6	2.8	52.0	48.0
Ludvika	4.0	5,376	57.8	25.7	12.4	0.7	3.4	61.2	38.8
Säter	1.6	2,174	53.9	20.5	11.0	12.8	1.8	55.7	44.3
Rural vote	71.5	97,299	50.7	21.4	8.3	16.0	3.6	54.2	45.8
Postal vote	2.7	3,651							
Total	3.6	136,075	51.8	22.6	10.0	12.0	3.6	55.4	44.6
Source: SCB

=== Kristianstad ===
Location	Share	Votes	S	FP	H	B	Left	Right
Hässleholm	3.8	5,133	49.9	22.9	23.5	3.6	49.9	50.1
Kristianstad	9.3	12,502	49.5	26.7	22.2	1.6	49.5	50.5
Simrishamn	2.7	3,579	47.9	23.6	17.2	11.3	47.9	52.1
Ängelholm	4.1	5,433	50.3	17.1	26.4	6.2	50.3	49.7
Rural vote	78.0	104,468	41.6	21.3	15.7	21.4	41.6	58.4
Postal vote	2.1	2,805						
Total	3.5	133,920	43.0	21.7	17.6	17.7	43.0	57.0
Source: SCB

=== Kronoberg ===
Location	Share	Votes	S	FP	H	B	K	Left	Right
Ljungby	4.3	3,551	45.0	31.3	14.7	4.6	4.4	49.4	50.6
Växjö	12.3	10,028	43.6	26.2	24.8	2.0	3.4	47.0	53.0
Rural vote	80.9	66,214	39.3	13.6	17.2	26.7	3.2	42.5	57.5
Postal vote	2.5	2,060							
Total	2.2	81,853	39.9	16.2	18.4	22.3	3.2	43.9	56.1
Source: SCB

=== Malmöhus ===
==== Malmö area ====
Location	Share	Votes	S	FP	H	B	K	Left	Right
Hälsingborg	20.6	39,500	53.4	21.4	22.5	0.2	2.5	55.9	44.1
Landskrona	7.2	13,904	66.2	17.5	14.1	0.1	2.1	68.3	31.7
Lund	10.2	19,499	50.1	23.9	23.7	1.2	1.2	51.2	48.8
Malmö	58.6	112,371	54.7	17.8	25.0	0.2	2.3	57.0	43.0
Postal vote	3.4	6,555							
Total	5.1	191,829	53.9	19.3	24.4	0.3	2.1	56.0	44.0
Source: SCB

==== Malmöhus County ====
Location	Share	Votes	S	FP	H	B	K	Left	Right
Eslöv	3.4	4,908	54.7	22.9	15.6	6.3	0.4	55.2	44.8
Höganäs	2.9	4,138	71.6	16.4	11.1	0.7	0.2	71.7	28.3
Skanör-Falsterbo	0.4	516	28.1	27.3	39.0	5.6	0.0	28.1	71.9
Trelleborg	6.8	9,741	61.4	19.7	15.5	1.0	2.4	63.8	36.2
Ystad	5.1	7,338	63.6	19.4	16.4	0.6	0.1	63.6	36.4
Rural vote	79.4	114,370	47.3	17.1	11.0	24.3	0.3	47.7	52.3
Postal vote	2.1	3,072							
Total	3.8	144,083	49.8	17.7	12.3	19.8	0.4	50.2	49.8
Source: SCB

=== Norrbotten ===
Location	Share	Votes	S	FP	H	B	K	Left	Right
Boden	4.8	5,320	55.4	23.0	15.2	0.4	6.1	61.5	38.5
Haparanda	1.2	1,307	44.6	17.1	25.5	1.0	11.8	56.4	43.6
Kiruna	7.6	8,403	45.9	16.7	9.7	0.2	27.5	73.4	26.6
Luleå	10.1	11,084	46.3	16.8	18.4	0.6	17.9	64.2	35.8
Piteå	2.6	2,814	63.6	16.1	14.1	1.3	4.8	68.4	31.6
Rural vote	70.5	77,719	50.4	9.3	10.5	12.0	17.7	68.2	31.8
Postal vote	3.2	3,567							
Total	2.9	110,214	50.0	11.9	12.1	8.7	17.3	67.3	32.7
Source: SCB

=== Skaraborg ===
Location	Share	Votes	S	FP	H	B	K	Left	Right
Falköping	5.0	6,660	47.7	32.0	15.2	3.1	2.1	49.8	50.2
Hjo	2.0	2,679	42.7	27.9	21.0	7.1	1.3	44.0	56.0
Lidköping	5.8	7,682	47.6	32.2	12.0	0.4	7.7	55.4	44.6
Mariestad	3.8	5,025	46.6	32.4	16.2	1.3	3.5	50.1	49.9
Skara	3.5	4,690	48.1	31.8	15.9	2.7	1.5	49.6	50.4
Skövde	7.7	10,196	44.8	34.0	14.0	3.1	4.1	48.9	51.1
Tidaholm	2.6	3,494	57.9	27.4	7.5	0.8	6.4	64.3	35.7
Rural vote	67.0	88,609	31.0	24.5	15.8	27.9	0.9	31.8	68.2
Postal vote	2.4	3,238							
Total	3.5	132,273	35.9	27.0	15.7	19.5	1.9	37.7	62.3
Source: SCB

=== Stockholm ===
==== Stockholm (city) ====
Location	Share	Votes	S	FP	H	B	K	Left	Right
Stockholm	100.0	431,880	38.8	36.3	18.2	0.2	6.5	45.3	54.7
Total	11.4	431,880	38.8	36.3	18.2	0.2	6.5	45.3	54.7
Source: SCB

==== Stockholm County ====
Location	Share	Votes	S	FP	H	B	K	Left	Right
Djursholm	1.9	3,682	21.3	26.8	50.8	0.3	0.9	22.2	77.8
Lidingö	5.4	10,341	29.8	33.4	32.9	0.2	3.7	33.5	66.5
Nacka	4.3	8,215	47.4	30.4	15.7	0.2	6.3	53.7	46.3
Norrtälje	1.9	3,599	48.0	28.0	19.2	1.0	3.8	51.8	48.2
Nynäshamn	2.3	4,374	64.4	21.1	8.3	0.0	6.2	70.6	29.4
Sigtuna	0.6	1,243	40.6	28.1	22.1	8.9	0.2	40.9	59.1
Solna	10.3	19,684	43.2	34.3	13.3	0.2	8.9	52.1	47.9
Sundbyberg	7.0	13,407	53.1	29.5	7.9	0.2	9.3	62.4	37.6
Södertälje	7.1	13,498	56.0	25.8	13.0	0.6	4.7	60.7	39.3
Vaxholm	0.9	1,768	40.4	44.5	13.5	0.6	1.0	41.4	58.6
Öregrund	0.5	963	35.4	33.3	22.7	7.6	0.9	36.3	63.7
Östhammar	0.4	716	38.0	35.2	22.7	1.3	0.3	38.3	61.7
Rural vote	54.6	104,446	44.1	29.0	13.3	9.3	4.2	48.4	51.6
Postal vote	2.8	5,367							
Total	5.1	191,303	44.4	29.7	15.6	5.3	5.0	49.4	50.6
Source:SCB

=== Södermanland ===
Location	Share	Votes	S	FP	H	B	K	Left	Right
Eskilstuna	25.1	30,183	62.3	27.3	6.6	0.9	3.0	65.3	34.7
Flen	2.2	2,707	55.6	25.2	13.9	4.7	0.6	56.2	43.8
Katrineholm	7.1	8,507	62.6	23.9	11.1	0.8	1.5	64.2	35.8
Mariefred	1.2	1,476	43.1	31.5	16.5	8.6	0.3	43.4	56.6
Nyköping	9.4	11,356	60.8	23.5	12.9	2.0	0.9	61.6	38.4
Oxelösund	2.3	2,785	66.9	19.4	7.0	1.8	4.9	71.8	28.2
Strängnäs	3.3	3,965	45.4	30.1	21.5	2.7	0.3	45.7	54.3
Torshälla	1.8	2,213	65.9	21.4	6.0	2.2	4.5	70.4	29.6
Trosa	0.6	700	50.6	29.4	18.7	1.3	0.0	50.6	49.4
Rural vote	44.4	53,490	49.6	19.8	7.8	22.0	0.9	50.4	49.6
Postal vote	2.5	3,044							
Total	3.2	120,426	55.0	23.2	9.5	10.7	1.6	56.6	43.4
Source: SCB

=== Uppsala ===
Location	Share	Votes	S	FP	H	B	K	Left	Right
Enköping	6.4	5,242	54.8	25.3	16.6	2.0	1.3	56.1	43.9
Uppsala	39.9	32,823	47.0	30.0	18.9	1.4	2.7	49.7	50.3
Rural vote	50.9	41,866	49.8	17.2	7.9	23.5	1.6	51.4	48.6
Postal vote	2.9	2,397							
Total	2.2	82,328	48.3	23.3	13.7	12.7	2.0	50.3	49.7
Source: SCB

=== Värmland ===
Location	Share	Votes	S	FP	H	B	K	Left	Right
Arvika	5.1	7,589	49.2	29.7	10.6	2.4	8.2	57.4	42.6
Filipstad	2.3	3,429	55.3	24.5	14.1	0.5	5.6	60.9	39.1
Hagfors	2.5	3,801	68.6	9.2	5.4	0.5	16.4	85.0	15.0
Karlstad	12.5	18,674	47.0	30.6	17.7	0.6	4.0	51.0	49.0
Kristinehamn	7.0	10,474	55.0	28.4	11.3	1.6	3.8	58.8	41.2
Säffle	3.1	4,652	45.2	28.6	11.8	8.0	6.4	51.6	48.4
Rural vote	65.1	97,564	53.3	15.7	10.8	14.6	5.6	58.9	41.1
Postal vote	2.4	3,581							
Total	4.0	149,764	52.2	19.9	12.1	10.2	5.6	57.8	42.2
Source: SCB

=== Västerbotten ===
Location	Share	Votes	S	FP	H	B	K	Left	Right
Lycksele	1.5	1,672	45.2	36.6	16.9	0.0	1.3	46.5	53.5
Skellefteå	8.5	9,808	59.1	20.3	14.5	1.0	5.2	64.3	35.7
Umeå	7.5	8,597	45.1	35.3	17.8	0.9	1.0	46.1	53.9
Rural vote	79.4	91,542	44.8	28.2	10.5	14.6	1.8	46.7	53.3
Postal vote	3.2	3,690							
Total	3.0	115,309	46.0	28.2	11.9	11.9	2.0	48.1	51.9
Source: SCB

=== Västernorrland ===
Location	Share	Votes	S	FP	H	B	K	Left	Right
Härnösand	5.2	7,746	45.4	32.7	17.1	1.5	3.2	48.6	51.4
Kramfors	5.3	8,027	55.5	13.2	3.2	3.7	24.5	79.9	20.1
Sollefteå	3.0	4,537	54.1	16.9	16.7	10.9	1.4	55.5	44.5
Sundsvall	8.9	13,300	45.9	32.1	17.5	0.6	3.9	49.8	50.2
Örnsköldsvik	2.5	3,700	41.1	33.9	20.0	1.0	3.9	45.1	54.9
Rural vote	72.1	108,261	55.8	16.1	5.4	15.9	6.8	62.6	37.4
Postal vote	3.0	4,544							
Total	4.0	150,115	53.7	18.9	8.2	12.3	6.9	60.6	39.4
Source: SCB

=== Västmanland ===
Location	Share	Votes	S	FP	H	B	K	Left	Right
Arboga	4.8	5,085	62.1	24.2	9.8	1.4	2.5	64.6	35.4
Fagersta	6.1	6,432	69.3	18.6	6.0	1.8	4.4	73.7	26.3
Köping	6.3	6,638	59.4	22.8	8.8	3.9	5.2	64.5	35.5
Sala	5.2	5,500	54.1	23.8	10.9	8.9	2.2	56.3	43.7
Västerås	28.4	30,023	58.8	25.4	10.2	1.7	4.0	62.7	37.3
Rural vote	46.5	49,168	52.9	16.2	5.5	21.7	3.6	56.5	43.5
Postal vote	2.7	2,857							
Total	2.8	105,703	56.1	20.6	8.0	11.6	3.7	59.8	40.2
Source: SCB

=== Älvsborg ===
==== Älvsborg N ====
Location	Share	Votes	S	FP	H	B	K	Left	Right
Alingsås	8.0	8,259	44.3	39.3	11.5	1.9	3.0	47.3	52.7
Trollhättan	12.6	13,047	58.0	30.4	5.7	1.4	4.5	62.5	37.5
Vänersborg	7.9	8,208	45.6	35.5	13.6	3.9	1.4	47.0	53.0
Åmål	4.4	4,529	55.4	29.8	12.6	0.5	1.7	57.1	42.9
Rural vote	64.8	66,944	36.8	24.8	12.6	23.8	2.0	38.8	61.2
Postal vote	2.3	2,334							
Total	2.7	103,321	41.4	28.1	12.0	16.2	2.3	43.7	56.3
Source: SCB

==== Älvsborg S ====
Location	Share	Votes	S	FP	H	B	K	Left	Right
Borås	32.5	30,237	48.2	21.6	23.9	0.7	5.6	53.8	46.2
Ulricehamn	4.5	4,226	39.5	28.9	26.2	4.4	1.0	40.5	59.5
Rural vote	60.6	56,387	36.1	14.7	24.9	22.6	1.7	37.7	62.3
Postal vote	2.4	2,214							
Total	2.5	93,064	39.9	17.9	25.0	14.3	2.9	42.9	57.1
Source: SCB

=== Örebro ===
Location	Share	Votes	S	FP	H	B	K	Left	Right
Askersund	1.7	2,265	48.7	21.0	13.2	16.6	0.4	49.1	50.9
Karlskoga	11.8	15,727	54.5	24.1	8.1	3.9	9.4	63.9	36.1
Kumla	3.6	4,780	54.4	29.6	7.1	1.3	7.7	62.1	37.9
Lindesberg	2.3	3,030	49.7	26.3	18.8	2.0	3.1	52.8	47.2
Nora	1.3	1,757	48.0	28.8	17.9	0.8	4.5	52.5	47.5
Örebro	28.0	37,263	54.3	30.1	11.3	0.8	3.5	57.8	42.2
Rural vote	48.8	64,931	52.5	21.2	7.4	15.4	3.5	56.0	44.0
Postal vote	2.5	3,371							
Total	3.5	133,124	52.6	24.9	9.6	8.7	4.2	56.9	43.1
Source: SCB

=== Östergötland ===
Location	Share	Votes	S	FP	H	B	K	Left	Right
Linköping	15.3	29,055	51.3	25.9	16.8	1.1	4.9	56.2	43.8
Mjölby	2.7	5,036	58.1	21.7	12.1	5.9	2.1	60.2	39.8
Motala	6.9	13,020	56.5	25.1	10.9	1.6	6.0	62.4	37.6
Norrköping	24.6	46,623	56.5	17.9	20.6	1.1	3.9	60.4	39.6
Skänninge	1.0	1,972	46.1	19.6	18.7	13.7	1.8	47.9	52.1
Söderköping	1.5	2,829	43.9	17.1	24.2	14.3	0.5	44.4	55.6
Vadstena	1.2	2,213	50.2	25.7	19.1	4.2	0.8	51.0	49.0
Rural vote	44.2	83,760	50.8	14.6	11.7	20.7	2.1	52.9	47.1
Postal vote	2.7	5,179							
Total	5.0	189,687	52.2	18.6	15.7	10.4	3.1	55.3	44.7
Source: SCB
