= Bengt Holgersson =

Swedish politician (born 1941)

1st Governor of Skåne
- In office 1997–2006
- Appointed by: Göran Persson
- Preceded by: Position established
- Succeeded by: Göran Tunhammar

Personal details
- Born: September 16, 1941 (age 85) Älghult, Sweden
- Party: Swedish Social Democratic Party
- Education: Lund University
- Profession: Politician

Bengt Holgersson (born September 16, 1941) was the first Governor of Skåne County after a merger of Malmöhus County and Kristianstad County in 1997. Holgersson was involved in a corruption scandal in April 2006. Both Holgersson and municipal commissioner Ilmar Reepalu were tried for corruption regarding a trip to South Africa which they had accepted from Sigma AB. In the end Both Holgersson and Reepalu were acquitted. In 2006 he was succeeded by Göran Tunhammar as Governor of Skåne.
