= Stenared =

- Location within Västra Götaland Location within Sweden
- Coordinates: 57°48′20″N 12°11′20″E
- Country: Sweden
- Province: Västergötland
- County: Västra Götaland County
- Municipality: Göteborg Municipality

Area
  - Total: 0.27 km^{2} (0.10 sq mi)

Population (31 December 2010)
  - Total: 237
  - Density: 865/km^{2} (2,240/sq mi)
- Time zone: UTC+1 (CET)
  - Summer (DST): UTC+2 (CEST)

Stenared is a locality situated in Göteborg Municipality, Västra Götaland County, Sweden with 237 inhabitants in 2010.
