= Margareta Pålsson =

Swedish politician and civil servant

3rd Governor of Skåne
- In office 1 September 2012 – 31 July 2016
- Appointed by: Fredrik Reinfeldt
- Preceded by: Göran Tunhammar
- Succeeded by: Anneli Hulthén

Member of the Swedish Parliament for Skåne County North and East
- In office 30 September 2002 – 31 August 2012

Personal details
- Born: 18 August 1949 (age 76) Ljungbyhed, Kristianstad County
- Party: Moderate
- Spouse: Lars Pålsson
- Profession: Teacher

Margareta Pålsson (born 18 August 1949) was the Governor of Skåne, in office from 2012 to 2016. A politician of the Moderate Party, Pålsson was a member of the Riksdag, the Parliament of Sweden, from 2002 to 2012.
