= Governor of Skåne County =

- Landshövding i Skåne län
- Coat of arms of Skåne County.
- Incumbent; Peter Danielsson since 1 November 2025
- Skåne County Administrative Board
- Residence: The residence in Malmö, Malmö
- Appointer: Government of Sweden
- Term length: Six years (Note: The governor is often appointed for a six-year mandate. It can be extended if the person has not reached retirement age.)
- Precursor: Governor of Malmöhus County; Governor of Kristianstad County
- Formation: 1997
- First holder: Bengt Holgersson
- Deputy: Deputy County Governor (Länsöverdirektören)
- Salary: SEK 102,800/month (2017)
- Website: Governor of Skåne

This is a list of governors for Skåne County in Sweden. The county was recreated in 1997 by a merger of Malmöhus County and Kristianstad County. For the period 1719–1996 see List of governors of Malmöhus County and List of governors of Kristianstad County.

1. Bengt Holgersson (1997–2005)
2. Göran Tunhammar (2006–2012)
3. Margareta Pålsson (2012–2016)
4. Anneli Hulthén (2016–2025)
5. Peter Danielsson (2025– )

== List of county governors of Helsingborg County, Landskrona County, and Malmöhus County ==
Before 1719, Scania was divided into counties with different borders from those in effect for Kristianstad County and Malmöhus County between 1719 and 1996. During 1658–1719, and again 1801–1809, the province was included in the Scanian Dominion (Skånska Generalguvernementet in Swedish). For the governors-general during these periods, see List of governors-general of Skåne. During the period 1670–1675, the Scanian Dominion was suspended and three county governors administered the counties in the area, answering directly to the Swedish king: one governor for Malmöhus County, one for Kristianstad County (which included Blekinge), and one for Halland County. During the rest of the period, the county governors in Scania answered to the governor-general and different county divisions were in place.

- 1661–1666 Peder Pedersson Hammarskjöld (1614–1671) (Governor of Helsingborg County, Landskrona County, and a part of Malmöhus County under Governors-General Gustaf Otto Stenbock and Gustaf Persson Banér)
- 1666–1669 Augustin Leijonsköld (1632–1682) (Governor of Malmöhus County under Governor-General Gustaf Persson Banér)
- 1669–1670 Claes Danckwardt-Lillieström (1613–1681) (Governor of Malmöhus County, Landskrona County and Helsingborg County)
- 1670–1677 Augustin Leijonsköld (1632–1682) (Governor of Malmöhus County, from 1676 under Governor-General Fabian von Fersen)

== See also ==
- List of governors-general of Skåne
