= Holgersson =

Holgersson is a Swedish surname. Notable people with the surname include:

- Bengt Holgersson, the first Governor of Skåne County after a merger of Malmöhus County and Kristianstad County in 1997
- Glenn Holgersson (born 1979), Swedish footballer playing for Örebro SK
- Hannah Holgersson (born 1976), opera singer from Höör, Skåne County, Sweden

== Fictional characters ==
- Nils Holgersson, the main character of The Wonderful Adventures of Nils
- Sven Holgersson, fictional character from Voltron franchise
