= Johan Nilsson i Skottlandshus =

Johan Nilsson RoKKMO
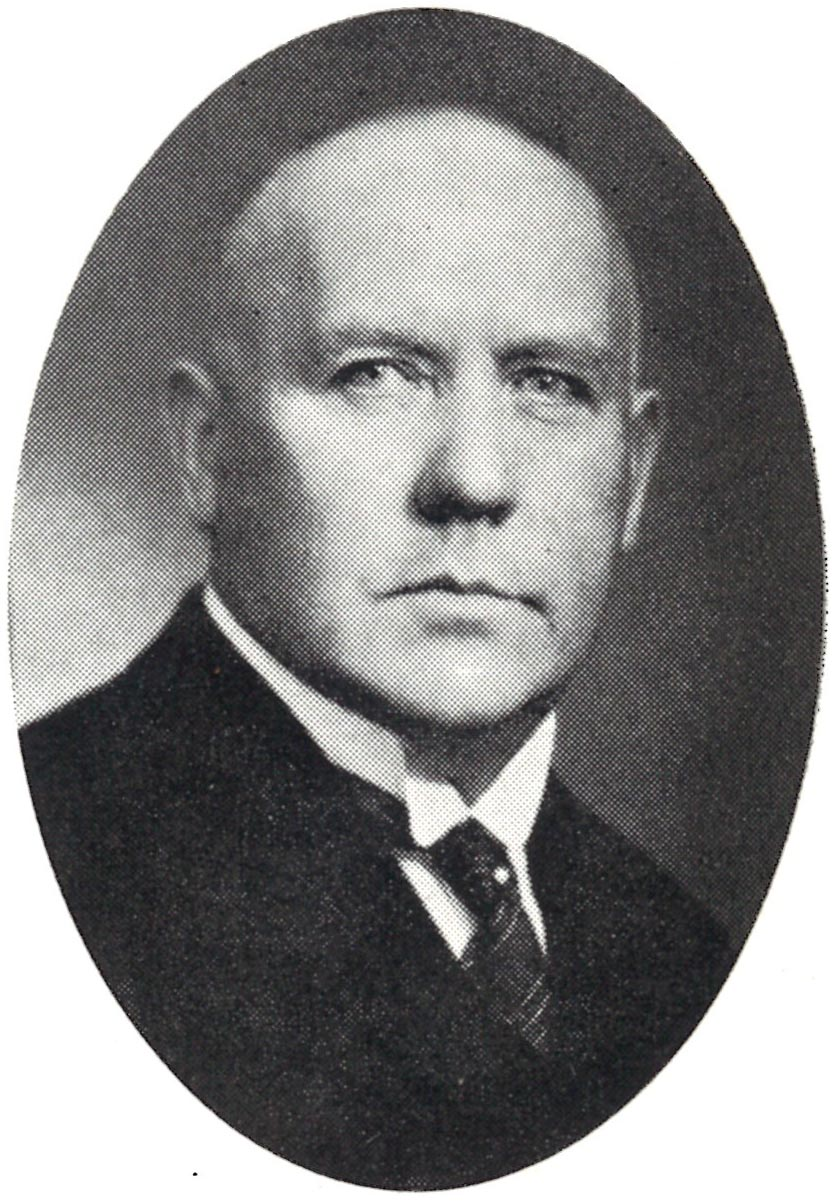

Speaker of the First Chamber
- In office 1937–1955
- Monarchs: Gustaf V Gustaf VI Adolf
- Preceded by: Axel Vennersten
- Succeeded by: John Bergvall

Leader of the National Party
- In office 1923–1923
- Preceded by: Ernst Trygger
- Succeeded by: Axel Vennersten

Governor of Kristianstad County
- In office 5 July 1923 – 26 September 1938
- Preceded by: Gerhard Louis De Geer
- Succeeded by: Alvar Elis Rodhe

Member of the Riksdag for Blekinge and Kristianstad County
- In office 1909–1955

Personal details
- Born: 21 August 1873 Färlöv, Sweden
- Died: 15 March 1963 (aged 89) Kristianstad, Sweden
- Party: Moderate Party of the First Chamber; National Party; General Electoral League
- Spouse: Signe Teresia Johnsson
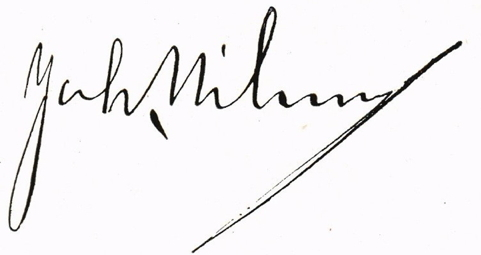
- Signature

Johan Nilsson RoKKMO (21 August 1873 – 15 March 1963) was a Swedish conservative statesman and politician who served as Speaker of the upper house (First Chamber) from 1937 to 1955. He also served as Governor of Kristianstad County from 1923 to 1938. Most notably an affiliate of the National Party, he was a Member of the Riksdag (parliament) from 1909 to 1955, the longest uninterrupted tenure in the history of Sweden.
