= Anna Johansson (politician) =

Swedish politician (born 1971)

Anna Johanssson
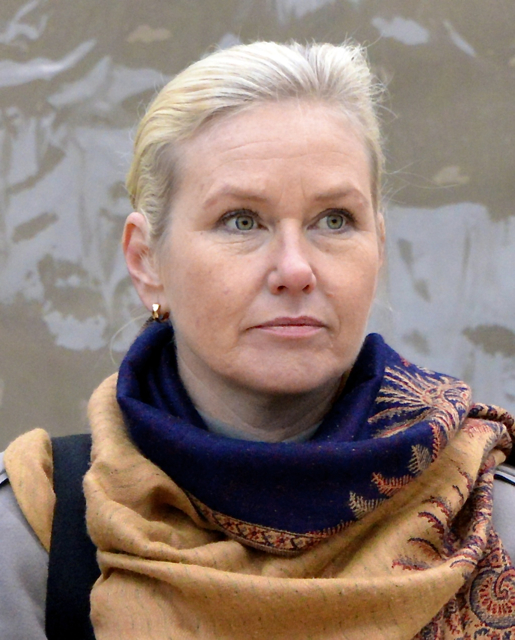
- Johansson speaks at the inauguration of the Northern Link in Stockholm on 30 nov 2014.

Minister for Infrastructure
- In office 3 October 2014 – 27 July 2017
- Monarch: Carl XVI Gustaf
- Prime Minister: Stefan Löfven
- Preceded by: Catharina Elmsäter-Svärd
- Succeeded by: Tomas Eneroth

Personal details
- Born: 29 May 1971 (age 55) Gothenburg, Sweden
- Party: Social Democrats

Anna Frida Wiktoria Johansson (born 29 May 1971) is a Swedish politician of the Social Democrats. She was the Minister for Infrastructure in the Swedish Government from 2014 to 2017.

She was elected as chair of the Gothenburg Social Democratic Youth League district in 1996, and elected to the Gothenburg Municipal council three years later. She has been chairman of the Social Democrats in Gothenburg Municipality, deputy member of the executive board of the Social Democrats and was deputy municipal commissioner in Gothenburg Municipality from 2009 to 2014.

Johansson was elected to the Swedish Riksdag in the 2014 general election. She was appointed Minister for Infrastructure by newly elected Prime Minister Stefan Löfven on 3 October 2014. Following the Swedish Transport Agency data leak scandal, on 26 July 2017 a majority in the Riksdag announced they would put forward a vote of confidence against her. She resigned on 27 July 2017.

Following a power struggle in the Gothenburg party district she announced she would resign the post as chair in February 2019. In November 2021 she announced she would be leaving politics and had chosen not to run for reelection in the 2022 Riksdag election.

She is the daughter of Göran Johansson, who was Mayor of Gothenburg Municipality from 1988 to 1991 and from 1994 to 2009.

== Cabinet minister ==
Anna Johansson became infrastructure minister in Stefan Löfven's government, according to Svenska Dagbladet. Following the Swedish Transport Agency IT scandal, the Alliance's declaration of no confidence concerned Johansson, Interior Minister Anders Ygeman, and Defence Minister Peter Hultqvist. At a press conference, Prime Minister Löfven announced that Johansson would leave her post with immediate effect.

Government offices
Preceded by Catharina Elmsäter-Svärd	Minister for Infrastructure; 2014–2017	Succeeded by Tomas Eneroth
