= Askim, Sweden =

Coordinates: 57°38′6″N 11°55′53″E

Askim (Swedish pronunciation: [ˈâɧːɪm]) is a district (stadsdelsnämndsområde) of the Gothenburg Municipality in Sweden, about 10 km (6 mi) south-west of the city centre. To the northwest of Askim is Västra Frölunda, to the east is Mölndal, and the sea is to the west.

As a district, Askim has a local board composed of the same proportions ruling Gothenburg as a whole. The voting base in Askim is predominantly bourgeoisie, while Gothenburg as a whole has a social democratic, socialist and environmentalist majority. This has caused some local tensions due to the strong liberal movement, and a strong local movement works to once again make Askim a separate municipality (kommun).

Askim was traditionally inhabited by fishermen. It is now a predominantly upper-middle class area with golf clubs, yacht clubs, and large houses. The less expensive areas are popular with families with children due to a reputation for safety and good schools.

The district of Askim is divided into smaller parts, including Askim, Hovås, Billdal and Skintebo. Beneath Askim lies many historical artifacts dating back to the Stone Age. Many worked pieces of rock show evidence of these times.

It is on the Askim coast, a part of Kattegatt, and has a mountainous terrain. Most of the buildings, which comprise mainly privately owned homes, are concentrated along the coast. The people living here have a much higher income compared to other average citizens of both Gothenburg and Sweden. The football team, founded in 1933, is called Askims IK, whose coach is the famous ex-player Pontus Kåmark, who played in the Sweden national team in 1994.
