= Mysterna =

- Location within Västra Götaland Location within Sweden
- Coordinates: 57°49′N 11°59′E
- Country: Sweden
- Province: Bohuslän
- County: Västra Götaland County
- Municipality: Gothenburg Municipality

Area
  - Total: 1.07 km^{2} (0.41 sq mi)

Population (31 December 2010)
  - Total: 3,418
  - Density: 3,186/km^{2} (8,250/sq mi)
- Time zone: UTC+1 (CET)
  - Summer (DST): UTC+2 (CEST)

Mysterna is a locality situated in Gothenburg Municipality, Västra Götaland County, Sweden. It had 3,418 inhabitants in 2010.
