= Låssby =

- Location within Västra Götaland Location within Sweden
- Coordinates: 57°44′N 11°50′E
- Country: Sweden
- Province: Bohuslän
- County: Västra Götaland County
- Municipality: Göteborg Municipality

Area
  - Total: 0.31 km^{2} (0.12 sq mi)

Population (31 December 2010)
  - Total: 251
  - Density: 811/km^{2} (2,100/sq mi)
- Time zone: UTC+1 (CET)
  - Summer (DST): UTC+2 (CEST)

Låssby is a locality situated in Gothenburg Municipality, Västra Götaland County, Sweden. It had 251 inhabitants in 2010.
