= Peter Danielsson =

Swedish politician (born 1974)

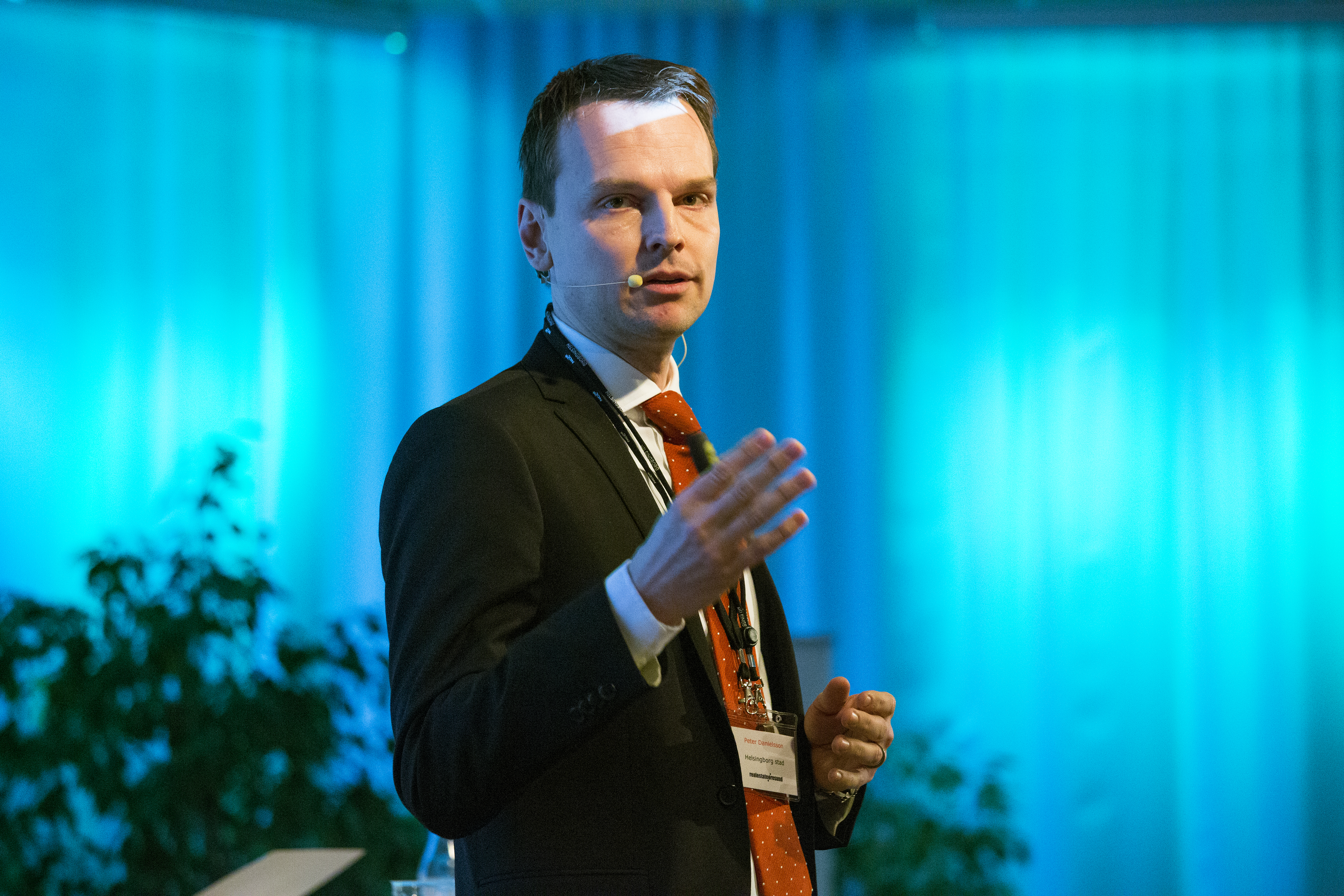

Governor of Skåne County
- Incumbent
- Assumed office 1 November 2025
- Monarch: Carl XVI Gustaf
- Prime Minister: Ulf Kristersson
- Preceded by: Anneli Hulthén

Chairman of the Swedish Association of Local Authorities and Regions
- In office 1 August 2022 – 21 March 2023
- Preceded by: Carola Gunnarsson (acting)
- Succeeded by: Anders Henriksson

Mayor of Helsingborg
- In office November 2006 – 25 October 2022
- Preceded by: Tomas Nordström
- Succeeded by: Christian Orsing

Deputy Leader of the Moderate Party
- In office 10 January 2015 – 19 October 2019
- Leader: Anna Kinberg Batra; Ulf Kristersson
- Preceded by: Gunilla Carlsson
- Succeeded by: Elisabeth Svantesson

Member of the Riksdag
- In office 15 September 2002 – 17 September 2006
- Constituency: Skåne County West

Personal details
- Born: Peter Erik Danielsson; 4 April 1974 (age 52) Helsingborg, Sweden
- Party: Moderate Party
- Education: Lund University

Peter Erik Danielsson (born 1974) is a Swedish Moderate Party politician and civil servant who has served as Governor of Skåne County since 1 November 2025. He previously served as the Mayor of Helsingborg from November 2006 to October 2022 and as Chairman of the Swedish Association of Local Authorities and Regions from 2022 to 2023.

He also served Deputy Leader of the Moderate Party from January 2015 to October 2019 and as Member of the Riksdag from 2002 to 2006.

Party political offices
Preceded by Gunilla Carlsson	First Deputy Party Leader of the Moderate Party; 2015–2019	Succeeded by Elisabeth Svantesson
Government offices
Preceded by Anneli Hulthén	Governor of Skåne County; 2025–present	Incumbent
