= Elmsäter =

Elmsäter is a Swedish surname. Notable people with the surname include:

- Catharina Elmsäter-Svärd (born 1965), Swedish politician
- Erik Elmsäter (1919–2006), the first Swedish athlete to compete in Summer and Winter Olympics
- Eva Elmsäter (born 1952), Swedish journalist
