= John Bergvall =

Swedish politician

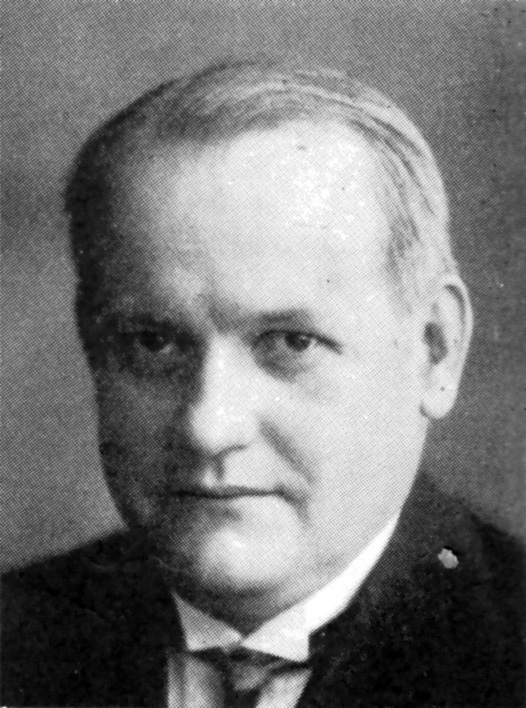
- John Bergvall circa 1938

Member of the Riksdag's Second Chamber for Stockholm City
- In office 1937–1945
- Monarch: Gustaf V

Member of the Riksdag's First Chamber for Stockholm City
- In office 1946–1959
- Monarch: Gustaf V

11th Speaker of the Riksdag's First Chamber
- In office 1956–1959
- Monarch: Gustaf V
- Preceded by: Johan Nilsson
- Succeeded by: Gustaf Sundelin

6th Mayor of Stockholm
- In office 1950–1954
- Monarch: Gustav V
- Preceded by: Zeth Höglund
- Succeeded by: Erik Huss

Personal details
- Born: October 26, 1892 Norrtälje, Sweden
- Died: August 11, 1959 (aged 66) Jakobs församling, Stockholm
- Party: Liberal People's Party
- Occupation: Politician

John Helmer Bergvall (October 26, 1892 – August 11, 1959) was a Swedish politician, a member of the Liberal People's Party. He served as a member of the Riksdag (Swedish Parliament) for the Constituency of Stockholm City. He was elected to the lower house of the Riksdag in 1937 until 1945. In 1946 he was elected to the upper house of the Riksdag until his death in 1959. He was the speaker of the upper house of the Riksdag from 1956 till his death. He was also a well-received politician in Stockholm, where he was, among other things, mayor from 1950 to 1954. In the Liberal People's Party, he was chairman of the executive committee from 1940 to 1956. He was also engaged in issues regarding alcohol.

In 1928 he became vice-president and later in 1931 president of Stockholmssystemet, a company politically involved with alcohol. From 1931 to 1938 he was a member of the council of Stockholm Municipality.

== Biography ==
John Helmer Bergvall was born in Norrtälje on October 26, 1892, and died on August 11, 1959, at Jakobs församling in Stockholm at the age of 66.
