= Ann-Sofie Hermansson =

Swedish politician (born 1964)

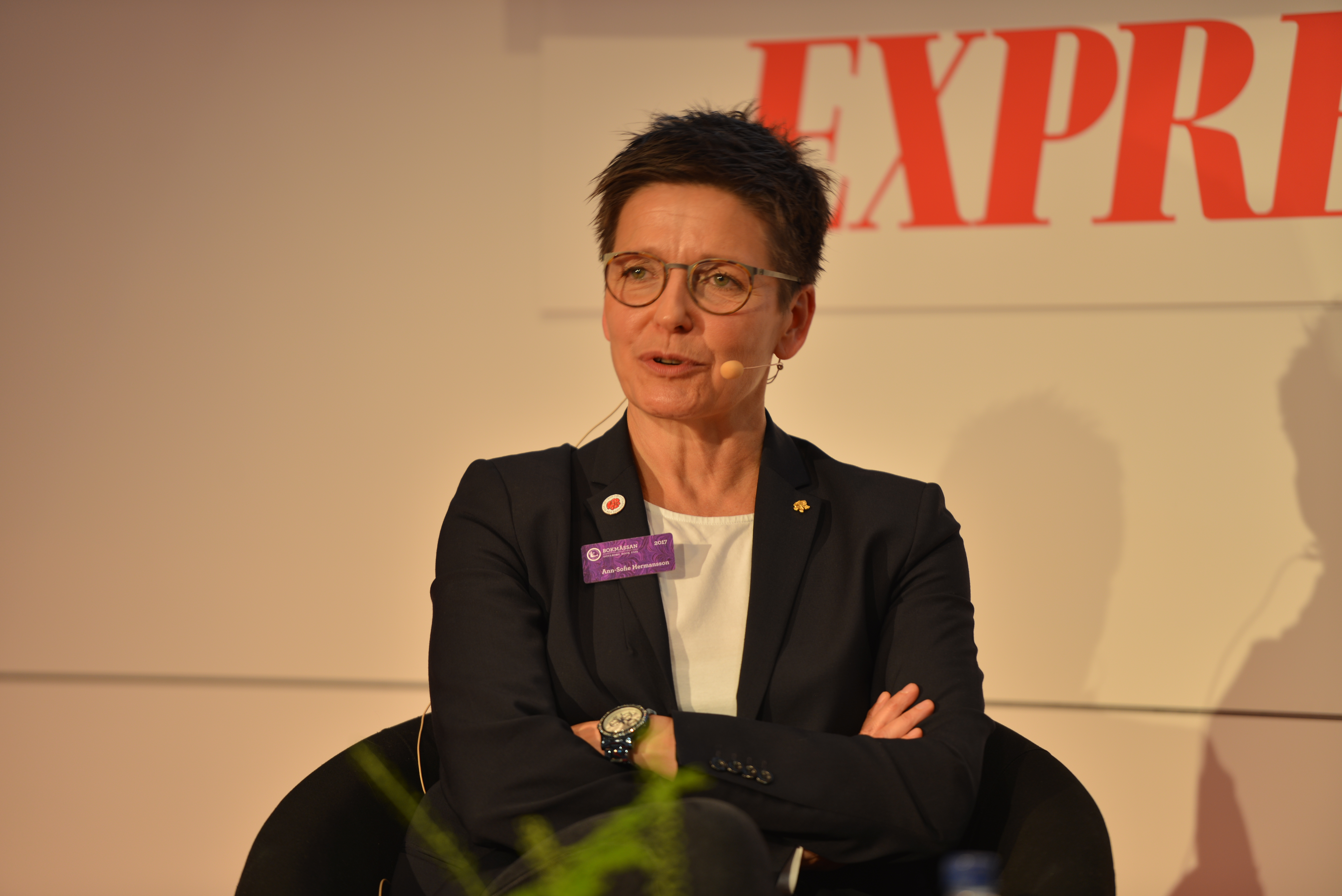

Mayor of Gothenburg
- In office 18 January 2016 – 22 November 2018
- Preceded by: Anneli Hulthén
- Succeeded by: Axel Josefson

Personal details
- Born: 2 October 1964 (age 62) Orust, Gothenburg
- Party: Social Democratic
- Education: University of Gothenburg

Britt Ann-Sofie Hermansson (born 2 October 1964) is a Swedish politician of the Social Democrats. She was chairman (Mayor) of the Gothenburg Municipality executive board from 18 January 2016 to 22 November 2018.

== Career ==
=== Early career ===
Born on the island of Tjörn in 1964, Hermansson began working at Volvo Cars at the age of 19, working in parts transport. There, she joined the metalworkers' union and the Social Democrats' youth wing.

She would go on to serve as official at Swedish Trade Union Confederation from 1996 to 2002 before serving as political secretary to the Gothenburg Municipality executive board from 2003 to 2008 and as ombudsman at the European Parliament to the Social Democrats political group from 2012 to 2016.

=== Mayor of Göteborg ===
In 2016, she was elected mayor of Gothenburg Municipality. As mayor, she oversaw the launch of the Equal Gothenburg campaign, stating that "For many years we have had projects to fix inequality. We'd take some money, we'd have a project in the suburbs, and then the money ends and the project stops. The idea of Equal Gothenburg is no more small projects: we should think about equality all the time when we plan."

In March 2018 the Gothenburg City Council blocked a planned showing and panel discussion of the film Burka Songs. In the aftermath of the debate, Hermansson wrote a series of blog posts where she accused two of the scheduled panel members of being undemocratic extremists who defended terrorists. She was then sued for libel over the blog posts. In February 2020, she was acquitted of the charges, with the court ruling that her posts were justifiable under freedom of speech.

== Post-politics ==
After failing to be re-elected, she left politics, using her heavy-goods-vehicle driving licence to work as a garbage collector for Renova.

Political offices
Preceded by Anneli Hulthén	Municipal Commissioner for Enterprise, Tourism and Events in Gothenburg Municipality; 2016–2018	Incumbent
Preceded by Anneli Hulthén	Mayor of Gothenburg; 2016–2018	Succeeded by Axel Josefson
