= List of governors of Kristianstad County =

This is a list of governors of Kristianstad County of Sweden from 1719 to its dissolution in 1997.

Kristianstad County was dissolved when it was merged with Malmöhus County to form Skåne County on 1 January 1997.

== List of governors ==
- Samuel von Hylteen (1719–1738)
- Nils Silfverskiöld (1739–1745)
- Christian Barnekow (1745–1761)
- Carl Axel Hugo Hamilton (1761–1763)
- Reinhold Johan von Lingen (1763–1772)
- Axel Löwen (1773–1776)
- Gabriel Erik Sparre (1776–1786)
- Carl Adam Wrangel (1786–1803)
- Eric von Nolcken (1803–1811)
- Axel De la Gardie (1811–1838)
- Georg Ludvig von Rosen (1838–1851)
- Knut Axel Posse (1852–1856)
- Emil von Troil (1856–1859)
- Axel Ludvig Rappe (1860–1866)
- Axel Trolle-Wachtmeister (1866–1883)
- Magnus De la Gardie (1883–1905)
- Louis De Geer (1905–1923)
- Johan Nilsson (1923–1938)
- Alvar Elis Rodhe (1938–1947)
- Per Westling (1947–1963)
- Bengt Petri (1964–1979)
- Lennart Sandgren (1979–1984)
- Einar Larsson (1985–1989)
- Anita Bråkenhielm (1990–1996)
- Hans Blom (1996)
