= Göran Tunhammar =

Swedish businessman and county governor

2nd Governor of Skåne
- In office 1 July 2006 – 1 September 2012
- Appointed by: Göran Persson
- Preceded by: Bengt Holgersson
- Succeeded by: Margareta Pålsson

Personal details
- Born: December 22, 1946 (age 79) Stockholm, Sweden
- Spouse: Johanna Tunhammar
- Education: Lund University
- Website: http://www.m.lst.se/m/

Göran Tunhammar (born 22 December 1946) was the Governor of Skåne County from 2006 to 2012. He was appointed to the position by the government on 1 July 2006. He was CEO for the Confederation of Swedish Enterprise between 2001 and 2003.
