= Göran Johansson (politician) =

Swedish politician (1945–2014)

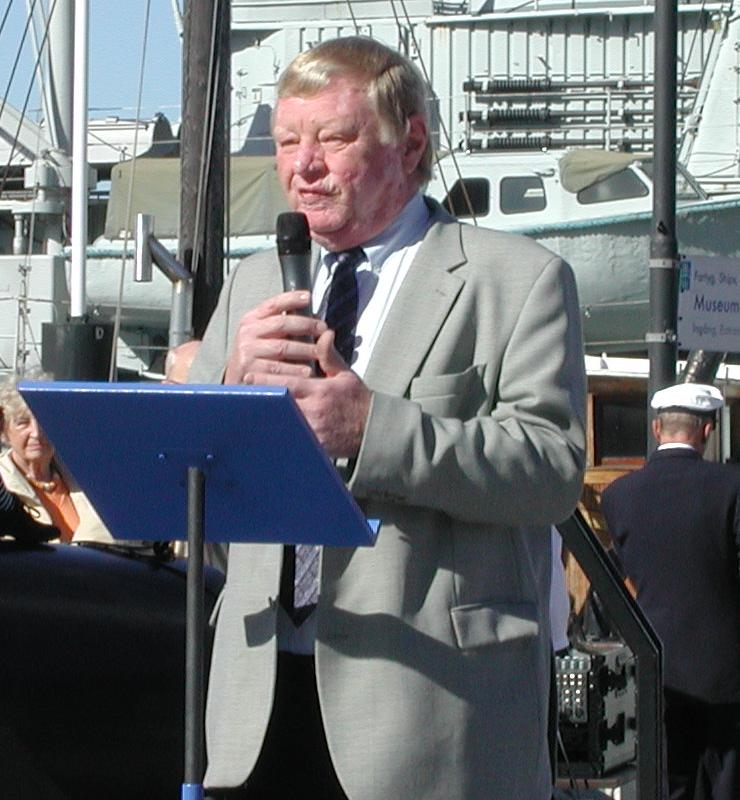
Göran Johansson in 2005.

Bengt Göran Lennart Johansson (31 August 1945 – 23 October 2014) was a Swedish Social Democratic Party politician. He was for many years the chairman (commissioner) of the Gothenburg Municipality Executive Board. With a working-class background, he was a union leader at his workplace at SKF and later became the Social Democratic Party's "strong man" in Gothenburg.

He was one of the best known politicians in Sweden and was voted as one of the nation's most popular politicians. However, he had been criticized for an undemocratic leadership which made several – especially female – politicians leave their assignments within the Social Democratic Party.

Johansson suffered from discoid lupus erythematosus, DLE, which caused his face to look swollen and red.

He was longlisted for the 2008 World Mayor award. Like New York mayor Michael Bloomberg, Johansson took public transit to work.

He is the father of Anna Johansson, who served as Minister for Infrastructure in the Swedish Government from October 2014 to July 2017.

Johansson died on 23 October 2014 at the age of 69.

Preceded by ?	Chairman of the Gothenburg Municipality Executive Board; 1988–1991	Succeeded by Johnny Magnusson
Preceded by Johnny Magnusson	Chairman of the Gothenburg Municipality Executive Board; 1994–2009	Succeeded by Anneli Hulthén
