= Nolvik =

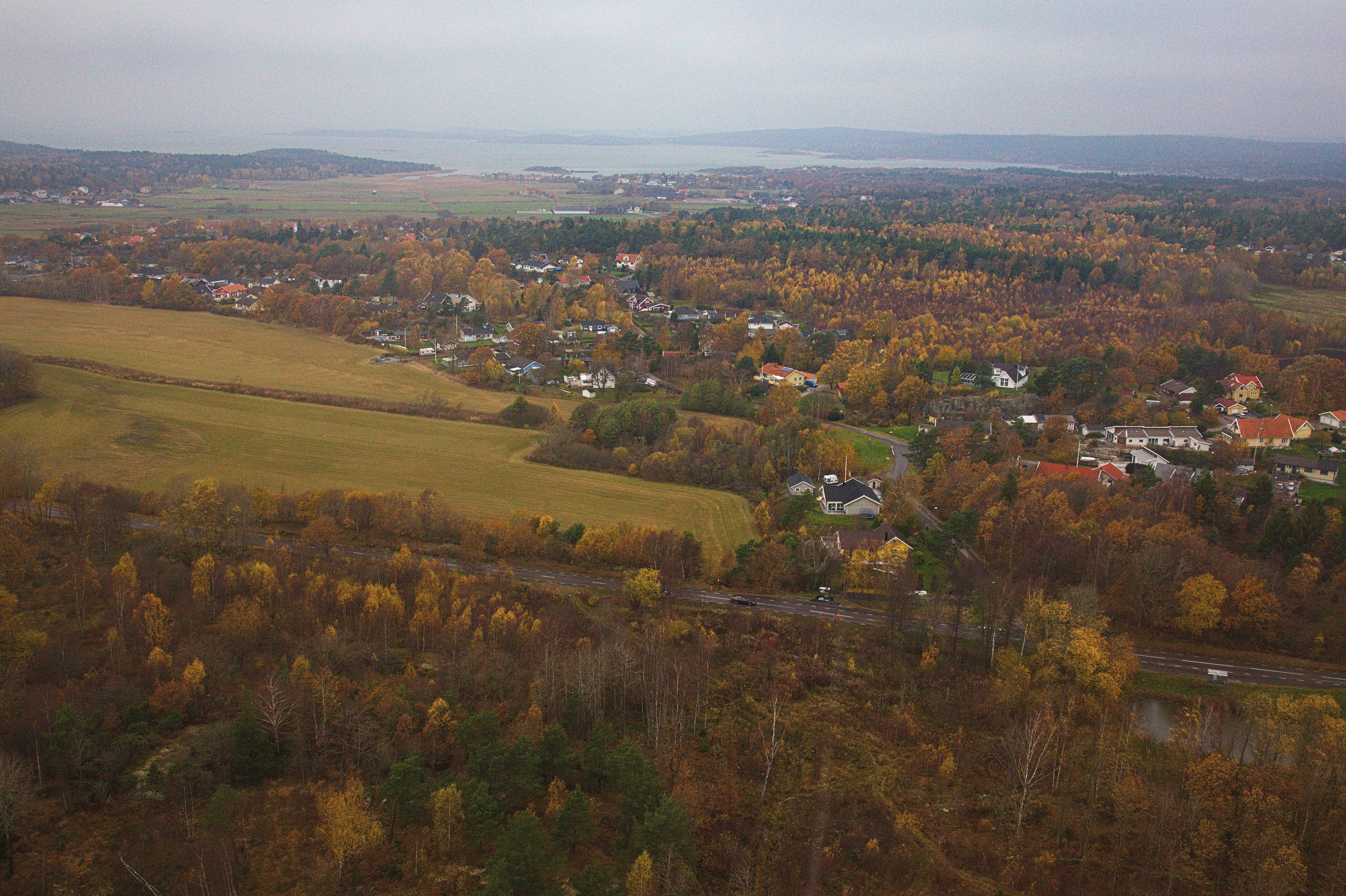
- Aerial view of Nolvik in 2013

- Location within Västra Götaland Location within Sweden
- Coordinates: 57°47′N 11°50′E
- Country: Sweden
- Province: Bohuslän
- County: Västra Götaland County
- Municipality: Göteborg Municipality

Area
  - Total: 0.88 km^{2} (0.34 sq mi)

Population (31 December 2010)
  - Total: 1,025
  - Density: 1,168/km^{2} (3,030/sq mi)
- Time zone: UTC+1 (CET)
  - Summer (DST): UTC+2 (CEST)

Nolvik is a locality situated in Gothenburg Municipality, Västra Götaland County, Sweden. It had 1,025 inhabitants in 2010.
