= Democrats (Gothenburg political party) =

Local political party in the city of Gothenburg, Sweden

Democrats Demokraterna
- Leader: Martin Wannholt
- Founded: 2017
- Ideology: Localism; Anti-West Link
- Political position: Big tent
- Gothenburg Municipal Council seats: 5 / 81
- Västra Götaland Regional Council seats: 0 / 149

Website
- https://demokraterna.se/

The Democrats (Swedish: Demokraterna) is a localist political party in Gothenburg Municipality and Västra Götaland County. It has been represented in the municipal council since 2018 and is currently the fifth largest party in the council.

The party was formed as a cross-party coalition in 2017 by former Moderate Party politician Martin Wannholt, aimed at halting construction of the West Link, a major railroad tunnel construction set to be completed in 2026.

After the 2018 local elections, the Democrats held negotiations with the centre-right Alliance parties aimed at forming a coalition, which collapsed when the Democrats refused to budge on its central question and the coalition parties refused to consider dropping the project.

== Electoral results ==
=== Gothenburg Municipal Council ===
Election	Votes	%	Seats	+/-	Outcome
2018	60,013	16.95 (#2)	16 / 81	▲16	Opposition
2022	21,535	6.14 (#5)	5 / 81	▼11	Opposition

=== Västra Götaland Regional Council ===
Election	Votes	%	Seats	+/-	Outcome
2018	37,163	3.44 (#9)	5 / 149	▲5	Opposition
2022	22,729	2.11 (#9)	0 / 149	▼5	No seats
