= Catharina Elmsäter-Svärd =

Swedish politician (born 1965)

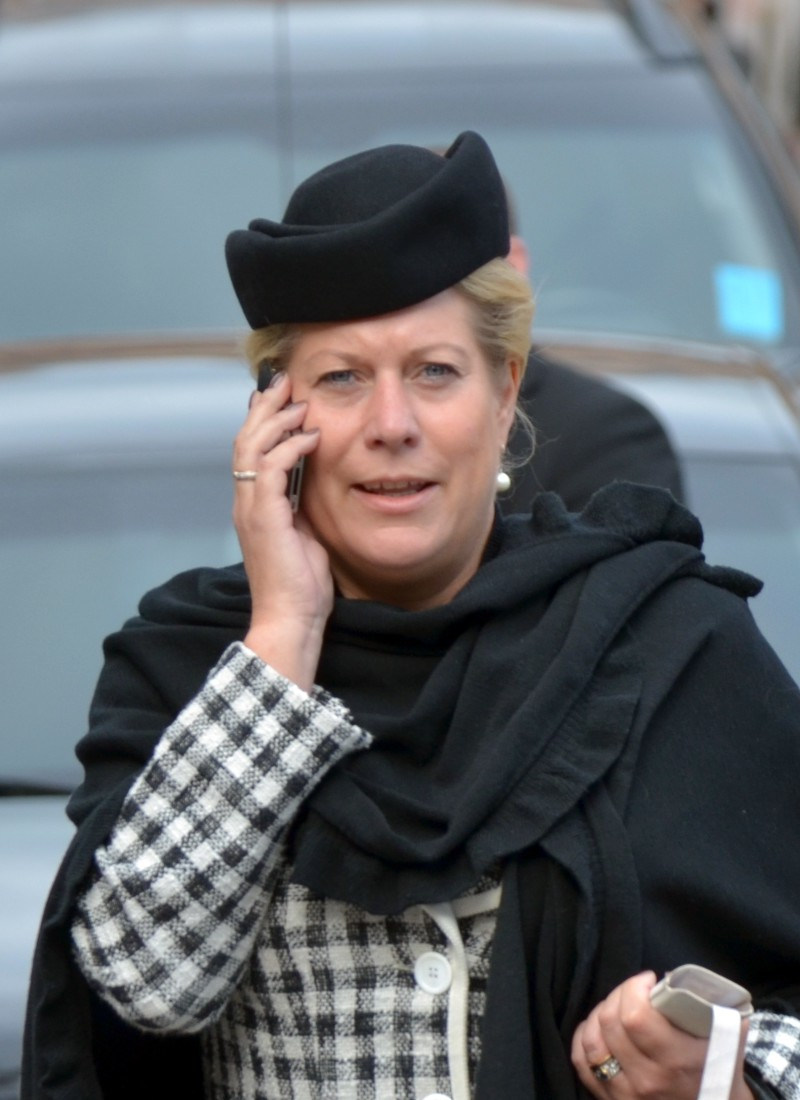
- Elmsäter-Svärd in 2012.

Minister for Infrastructure
- In office 5 October 2010 – 3 October 2014
- Monarch: Carl XVI Gustaf
- Prime Minister: Fredrik Reinfeldt
- Preceded by: Åsa Torstensson
- Succeeded by: Anna Johansson

Minister of Defence Acting
- In office 29 March 2012 – 18 April 2012
- Monarch: Carl XVI Gustaf
- Prime Minister: Fredrik Reinfeldt
- Preceded by: Sten Tolgfors
- Succeeded by: Karin Enström

Personal details
- Born: Catharina Sabine Maria Laurine Elmsäter-Svärd; 23 November 1965 (age 60) Mönsterås, Sweden
- Party: Moderate Party

Catharina Sabine Maria Laurine Elmsäter-Svärd (born 23 November 1965) is a Swedish politician who was Minister for Infrastructure from 2010 to 2014. A member of the Moderate Party, she was an MP of the Swedish Riksdag for Stockholm County from October to December 2014, having previously been that from 1997 to 2008. On 16 December 2014, she announced that she would leave politics.

She held the positions as Commissioner of Finance and Chief Commissioner in of Stockholm County Council from 2008 to 2010. She also served as acting Minister of Defence from 29 March to 18 April 2012, following the sudden resignation of Sten Tolgfors.

Political offices
Preceded by Chris Heister	Chief Commissioner of the Stockholm County Council; 2008–2010	Succeeded by Torbjörn Rosdahl
Preceded by Åsa Torstensson	Minister for Infrastructure; 2010–2014	Succeeded by Anna Johansson
Preceded by Sten Tolgfors	Minister for Defence; Acting; 2012	Succeeded by Karin Enström
