= Anneli Hulthén =

Swedish politician (born 1960)

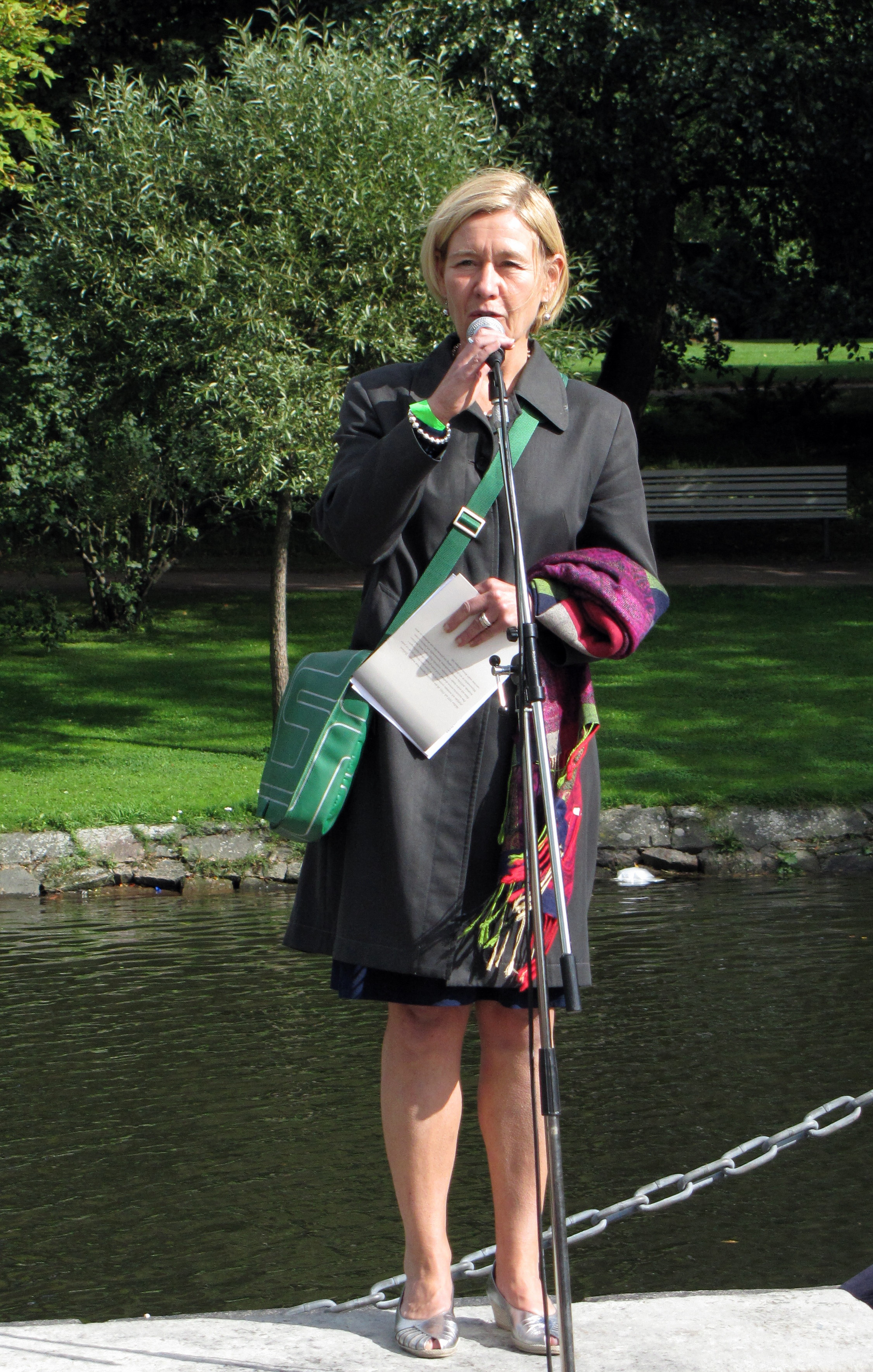

Governor of Skåne County
- In office 1 August 2016 – 30 September 2025
- Appointed by: Stefan Löfven
- Preceded by: Margareta Pålsson
- Succeeded by: Peter Danielsson

Mayor of Gothenburg
- In office 13 January 2009 – 18 January 2016
- Preceded by: Göran Johansson
- Succeeded by: Ann-Sofie Hermansson

Member of the European Parliament
- In office 1995–2002

Member of the Riksdag
- In office 1986–1996

Personal details
- Born: 27 July 1960 (age 65) Gothenburg, Sweden
- Party: Social Democratic

Anneli Maria Hulthén (born 27 July 1960) is a Swedish politician who served as Governor of Skåne County from August 2016 to September 2025. She was a Member of the Swedish parliament (the Riksdag) from 1986 until 1996, and a Member of the European Parliament from 1995 until 2002.

A member of the Social Democrats, she served as chairman (mayor) of the Gothenburg Municipality executive board from 2009 to 2016.

Hultén won the Politician Award at the 2011 World Entrepreneurship Forum in Singapore, for her work with Business Region Göteborg and their programmes "Expedition Forward", "Business Emergency Programme" and "Brew House Incubator".

== Honours ==
- Italy: Grand Officer of the Order of Merit of the Italian Republic (14 January 2019)

Political offices
Preceded by –	Member of the Riksdag; 1986–1996	Succeeded by –
New title	Member of the European Parliament; 1995–2002	Succeeded by Yvonne Sandberg-Fries
Preceded by –	Municipal Commissioner for Enterprise, Tourism and Events in Gothenburg Municipality; 2003–2016	Succeeded by Ann-Sofie Hermansson
Preceded by Göran Johansson	Mayor of Gothenburg; 2009–2016	Succeeded by Ann-Sofie Hermansson
Preceded by Margareta Pålsson	Governor of Skåne; 2016–2025	Succeeded by Peter Danielsson
