= Billdal =

- Location within Halland Location within Västra Götaland Location within Sweden
- Coordinates: 57°35′N 11°56′E
- Country: Sweden
- Province: Halland
- County: Halland County and Västra Götaland County
- Municipality: Kungsbacka Municipality and Gothenburg Municipality

Area
  - Total: 10.14 km^{2} (3.92 sq mi)

Population (31 December 2010)
  - Total: 10,289
  - Density: 1,015/km^{2} (2,630/sq mi)
- Time zone: UTC+1 (CET)
  - Summer (DST): UTC+2 (CEST)

Billdal is a bimunicipal locality situated in Kungsbacka Municipality, Halland County, and Gothenburg Municipality, Västra Götaland County, in Sweden. It had 10,289 inhabitants in 2010. It mainly consists of villas and terraced houses, grouped along a windling coastline with many islands.

== Notable natives ==
- Dark Tranquillity
- In Flames

== See also ==
- Greater Gothenburg
