= Malmöhus County =

Former Swedish county

Coordinates: 55°40′N 13°20′E

Malmöhus County Malmöhus län
- County of Sweden
- 1719–1996
- Flag Coat of arms

- Capital: Malmö
- History
  - Established: 1719
  - Disestablished: 1996
Succeeded by
Skåne County

Malmöhus County (Swedish: Malmöhus län) was a county of Sweden from 1719 to 1996. On 1 January 1997 it was merged with Kristianstad County to form Skåne County. It had been named after Malmöhus, a castle in Malmö, which was also where the governor originally lived.

== History ==
Malmöhus County was part of Skåne province which was controlled by Denmark until 1658. In 1657, Denmark declared war on Sweden, while Sweden was at war with Russia, Poland, and Austria. Swedish forces were sent immediately from Poland to Denmark. Denmark was defeated which required the transfer of Skåne, Halland, Blekinge and Bohuslän provinces to Sweden under the Treaty of Roskilde. Denmark attempted to regain the lost provinces until 1710, but was unsuccessful.

== Geography ==
Malmöhus County was part of Scania province situated on a peninsula that projects into the Baltic Sea on the northeast of the Öresund straits. The geography differs in many aspects from the rest of Sweden. The coastal regions typically have flat sandy beaches, while inland areas have ridges of wooded hills and fields of rich fertile soil, which were left behind from the glacial age. Skåne province is called the granary of Sweden due to its rich fertile soil.

== Politics ==
Until the 1991 election, Malmöhus County had two Riksdag constituencies, while the current area has been divided into three. In the Malmöhus timeframe, the four cities of Helsingborg, Landskrona, Lund and Malmö formed a four-city constituency, while the rural areas formed the Malmöhus constituency. In 1994, the Malmö constituency was formed and the three other cities were divided into north-south redrawn boundaries. After the merger with Kristianstad County, these constituencies have been known as Skåne Southern and Skåne Western.

== See also ==
- List of governors of Malmöhus County
- List of governors of Kristianstad County
- List of governors of Skåne County
