= Skåne County =

County (län) of Sweden

Skåne County Skåne län (Swedish) Scania County
- County of Sweden
- Flag Coat of arms

- Skåne County in Sweden

- Location map of Skåne County in Sweden
- Coordinates: 55°59′43″N 13°26′30″E
- Country: Sweden
- Founded: 1 January 1997
- Capital: Malmö, Kristianstad
- Municipalities: 33: Ängelholm; Åstorp; Båstad; Bjuv; Bromölla; Burlöv; Eslöv; Hässleholm; Helsingborg; Höganäs; Höör; Hörby; Kävlinge; Klippan; Kristianstad; Landskrona; Lomma; Lund; Malmö; Örkelljunga; Osby; Östra Göinge; Perstorp; Simrishamn; Sjöbo; Skurup; Staffanstorp; Svalöv; Svedala; Tomelilla; Trelleborg; Vellinge; Ystad

Government
  - Governor: Anneli Hulthén (S)
  - Council: Region Skåne

Area
  - Total: 11,302.77 km^{2} (4,364.02 sq mi)

Population (31 December 2023)
  - Total: 1,421,781
  - Rank: 3rd
  - Density: 125.7905/km^{2} (325.7959/sq mi)

GDP
  - Total: SEK 478 billion €51.151 billion (2015)
- Time zone: UTC+1 (CET)
  - Summer (DST): UTC+2 (CEST)
- ISO 3166 code: SE-M
- NUTS Region: SE224
- Website: www.lansstyrelsen.se; www.skane.se

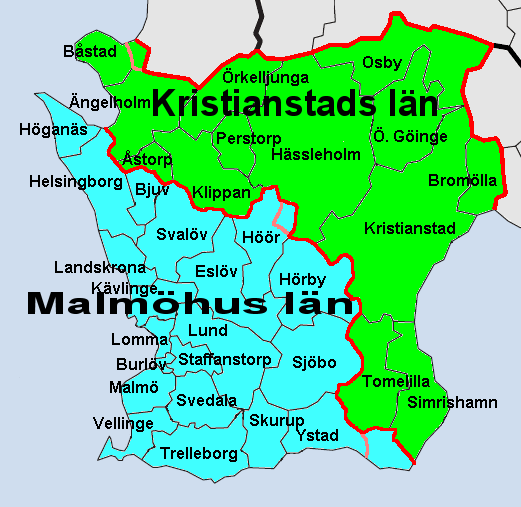
Counties before 1997.

Skåne County (Swedish: Skåne län, pronounced [ˈskôːnɛ ˈlɛːn]), sometimes referred to as Scania County or just Scania (/ˈskeɪniə/ SKAY-nee-ə) in English, is the southernmost county, or län, of Sweden, mostly corresponding to the traditional province of Scania. It borders the counties of Halland, Kronoberg and Blekinge and connects to Capital Region, Denmark by the Öresund Bridge across the Øresund strait. The seat of residence for the Skåne Governor is the city of Malmö. The headquarters of Skåne Regional Council are located in both Kristianstad and Malmö.

The present county was created in 1997 when Kristianstad County and Malmöhus County were merged; it covers around 3% of Sweden's total area, while its population of 1.3 million comprises 13% of Sweden's total population.

== Endonym and exonym ==
When the new county was established in 1997, it was named Skåne län as its borders coincide with those of the province Skåne. In English, the county as well as the province are sometimes known as Scania, but the name Skåne is more frequently used, e.g. by the county administrative board.

== Heraldry ==
The coat of arms for Skåne County is the same as for the province of Skåne, only with the tinctures reversed and the crown, beak and tongue of the griffin in the same color. When the arms are shown with a royal crown, it represents the County Administrative Board, which is the regional presence of (royal) government authority. Blazon: "Gules, a Griffin's head erased Or, crowned and armed the same."

== Provinces ==
Skåne County is the administrative equivalent of the province of Skåne, but it also includes an insignificant part of the province of Halland.

== Administration ==
Skåne County is administered by Region Skåne, one of the 20 county councils of Sweden. Its main responsibilities are for the public healthcare system and public transport. In addition, it has for a trial period assumed certain tasks from the County Administrative Board. The two former administrative county councils of the province of Skåne shown on the map, Kristianstad County and Malmöhus County, which were established in 1719, were merged in 1997, forming the present county with boundaries that are almost identical to the boundaries of the province.

The seat of residence for the Governor (landshövding) is the city of Malmö. The County Administrative Board is a Government Agency headed by a Governor. See List of Skåne Governors.

=== County council ===
Region Skåne is an evolved County Council, which was established in 1999 when the County Councils of the former counties were amalgamated.

Its county or regional assembly is the region's highest political body, and its members are elected by the electorate, as opposed to the county administrative board, that guards the national interests in the county under the chairmanship of the county governor (landshövding in Swedish).

== Municipalities ==
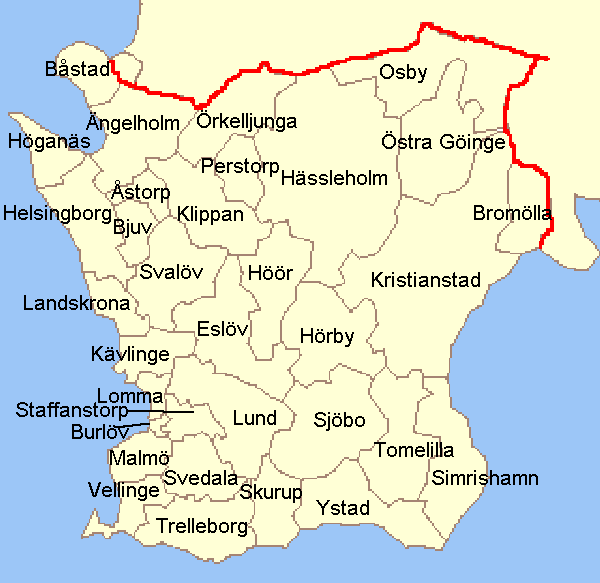
Municipalities of Skåne

Skåne County contains 33 municipalities (Swedish: kommuner), the largest by population being Malmö Municipality (340,000 inhabitants), Helsingborg Municipality (145,000), Lund Municipality (123,000 inhabitants) and Kristianstad Municipality (85,000 inhabitants). The municipalities have municipal governments, similar to city commissions, and are further divided into parishes. The parish division is traditionally used by the Church of Sweden, but also serves as a divisioning measure for Swedish census and elections.

1. Bjuv
2. Bromölla
3. Burlöv
4. Båstad
5. Eslöv
6. Helsingborg
7. Hässleholm
8. Höganäs
9. Hörby
10. Höör
11. Klippan
12. Kristianstad
13. Kävlinge
14. Landskrona
15. Lomma
16. Lund
17. Malmö
18. Osby
19. Perstorp
20. Simrishamn
21. Sjöbo
22. Skurup
23. Staffanstorp
24. Svalöv
25. Svedala
26. Tomelilla
27. Trelleborg
28. Vellinge
29. Ystad
30. Åstorp
31. Ängelholm
32. Örkelljunga
33. Östra Göinge

== Elections ==
=== Riksdag ===
The table details all Riksdag elections held in the area currently constituting Skåne County since the unicameral era began in 1970. Although both were rounded to 49.3 under one decimal, the leftist bloc had 49.33 to 49.25% for the centre-right bloc in the 1970 election.

Year	Votes	V	S	MP	C	L	KD	M	SD	NyD	Left	Right
1970	617,147	2.1	47.2		20.0	15.3	1.2	14.0			49.3	49.3
1973	641,980	2.8	45.0		26.5	7.7	1.0	16.7			47.8	50.9
1976	676,741	2.6	43.0		22.8	11.2	0.8	19.3			45.6	53.3
1979	677,896	3.2	42.7		15.3	11.4	0.7	25.9			45.9	52.6
1982	688,331	3.3	45.0	1.6	13.8	6.0	1.0	29.0			48.2	48.9
1985	687,808	3.1	43.3	1.5	10.4	14.0		27.1			46.5	51.6
1988	667,533	3.5	43.3	5.8	9.6	11.0	1.7	23.8			52.5	44.4
1991	680,256	2.7	35.9	3.0	6.6	8.0	5.9	28.0		6.9	38.6	48.4
1994	693,113	3.7	45.5	4.0	6.3	6.1	3.0	27.4		1.7	53.3	42.9
1998	653,092	8.2	37.3	3.6	4.0	4.4	10.2	27.8			49.0	46.4
2002	665,232	6.0	39.8	3.8	4.3	13.8	7.8	18.1	3.6		49.6	44.0
2006	707,231	3.9	33.7	4.5	6.0	8.4	5.0	29.6	5.7		42.0	48.9
2010	761,223	3.9	26.7	6.7	5.1	7.6	4.2	34.5	9.0		37.3	51.3
2014	797,657	4.4	28.3	6.8	4.7	5.7	3.4	24.7	17.9		39.5	38.5
2018	840,110	6.4	25.2	4.3	6.8	5.7	5.3	21.4	23.4		42.7	55.7

=== Regional ===
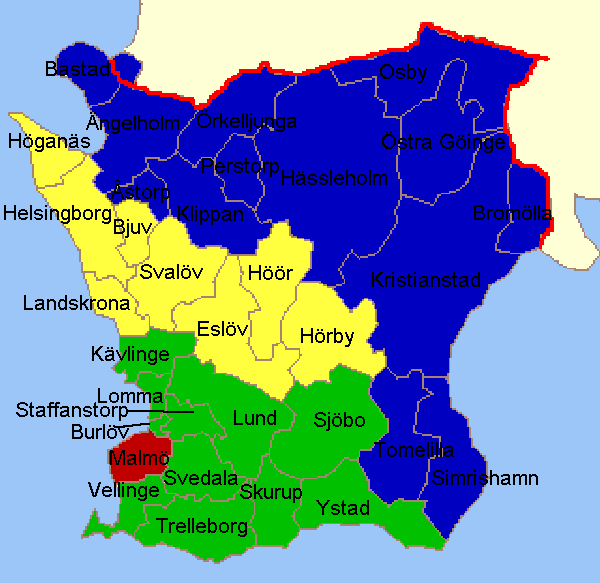
The electoral districts of Skåne County for national parliamentary elections

The county is divided into four parliamentary constituencies or electoral districts, electing 47 of the 349 members of the Riksdag. Each district is made up of one or more municipalities.

In the 2018 general election, the Sweden Democrats performed particularly well in Skåne County, getting the highest number of votes in 21 out of the county's 33 municipalities.

Overall representation in the Riksdag during the 2018–2022 mandate period was as follows:

Party	Seats	±
Social Democratic	12	−1
Sweden Democrats	11	+2
Moderate Party	9	−4
Centre Party	4	+2
Liberals	4	–
Christian Democrats	3	+1
Left Party	2	+1
Green Party	2	−2
Total	47	−1

== Localities in order of size ==
The ten most populous localities of Skåne County in 2020 were:

Locality	Population
Malmö	325,069
Helsingborg	113,828
Lund	94,393
Kristianstad	41,299
Landskrona	33,466
Trelleborg	30,808
Ängelholm	29,490
Ystad	20,195
Eslöv	19,794
Hässleholm	19,435

The ten largest municipalities of the county by total area are:

Municipality	Size (km^{2})
Kristianstad	1,820.76
Hässleholm	1,307.43
Simrishamn	1,254.90
Ystad	1,184.41
Trelleborg	1,176.64
Båstad	881.91
Vellinge	707.87
Höganäs	676.26
Osby	598.84
Skurup	511.60

== Demographics ==
Skåne county population pyramid

=== Foreign background ===
Swedish born and foreign born in Skåne county in 2022

SCB have collected statistics on backgrounds of residents since 2002. These tables consist of all who have two foreign-born parents or are born abroad themselves. The chart lists election years and the last year on record alone.

Location	2002	2006	2010	2014	2018	2019
Bjuv	18.3	20.8	24.7	26.1	31.9	32.9
Bromölla	9.8	10.8	12.9	15.6	20.1	20.7
Burlöv	24.8	30.0	36.2	39.5	44.3	45.4
Båstad	8.3	9.1	11.0	13.0	14.2	16.4
Eslöv	14.7	16.3	17.3	20.3	24.3	25.0
Helsingborg	20.2	22.6	25.9	29.1	34.2	35.2
Hässleholm	9.9	12.0	14.6	16.9	20.7	21.2
Höganäs	9.9	10.9	12.4	13.7	16.4	17.0
Hörby	7.8	9.7	12.0	13.5	15.9	15.9
Höör	9.6	11.0	12.5	13.0	14.8	14.9
Klippan	11.5	13.2	16.3	17.6	22.6	23.3
Kristianstad	11.5	14.0	17.6	21.2	24.0	24.8
Kävlinge	8.3	9.2	10.0	11.0	13.2	13.5
Landskrona	24.9	28.4	31.6	33.9	36.5	36.8
Lomma	7.7	8.0	9.2	9.8	12.0	12.5
Lund	17.1	18.3	21.5	23.4	26.9	27.7
Malmö	32.0	35.9	40.2	42.6	45.9	46.7
Osby	8.8	10.5	13.3	15.8	20.6	20.9
Perstorp	16.7	18.3	22.7	24.6	30.6	31.5
Simrishamn	7.0	8.5	9.7	11.7	15.2	15.3
Sjöbo	6.1	8.1	9.7	11.0	12.7	12.9
Skurup	8.7	10.8	12.4	13.4	16.4	16.8
Staffanstorp	10.6	11.6	13.6	15.0	17.8	19.1
Svalöv	11.5	12.7	14.7	17.6	21.7	22.7
Svedala	8.3	9.6	11.0	11.6	14.9	15.7
Tomelilla	6.8	8.3	10.4	12.1	15.4	16.1
Trelleborg	15.2	16.7	18.4	19.9	22.5	23.0
Vellinge	6.5	7.5	8.8	9.6	11.4	11.4
Ystad	8.0	8.9	9.7	10.6	12.9	13.0
Åstorp	17.8	21.1	24.9	27.8	33.3	33.8
Ängelholm	9.0	9.9	11.5	13.1	15.7	16.0
Örkelljunga	11.3	13.4	15.9	17.8	21.6	22.4
Östra Göinge	8.0	9.2	10.1	14.5	22.9	23.5
Total	17.6	19.9	23.1	25.4	29.0	29.7
Source: SCB

=== Country of birth ===
Foreign born population by country of birth
Country of birth	1970	1976	1981	1986	1991	1996	2001	2006	2011	2016	2021	2024
Syria	9	—	—	—	—	—	617	814	1,277	19,630	31,023	32,118
Iraq	22	—	—	—	—	—	7,927	12,615	21,052	22,947	25,068	24,458
Poland	2,761	4,211	5,666	8,398	10,611	11,460	11,757	14,119	18,384	20,861	21,713	22,553
Denmark	14,133	17,075	15,890	15,239	15,920	15,491	15,611	21,732	23,262	20,816	19,634	19,479
Yugoslavia	8,859	10,633	11,013	11,399	13,554	19,719	22,036	22,204	21,484	20,647	19,582	18,775
Bosnia and Herzegovina	—	—	—	—	—	8,493	11,380	12,703	13,256	13,745	14,283	14,191
Afghanistan	2	—	—	—	—	—	1,629	2,396	3,633	6,339	10,572	11,617
Romania	182	—	—	—	—	—	3,273	3,660	5,824	7,235	8,405	9,031
Iran	—	—	—	1,105	4,219	5,019	5,136	5,511	6,357	6,938	8,367	8,972
Germany	7,296	7,060	6,817	6,592	6,334	6,526	6,714	7,209	7,728	7,946	8,290	8,699
Lebanon	16	—	—	—	—	—	4,855	5,754	6,725	7,508	8,244	8,521
India	87	—	—	935	1,143	1,200	1,298	1,608	2,254	3,037	6,314	7,561
Turkey	456	690	913	960	1,328	1,666	1,988	2,969	4,392	4,719	5,916	6,654
Finland	10,668	8,669	8,692	8,334	8,321	8,232	7,926	7,637	7,268	6,999	6,306	5,859
Vietnam	—	—	—	—	—	—	2,971	3,233	3,730	4,571	5,475	5,674
Pakistan	27	—	—	—	—	—	361	930	1,953	2,291	4,442	5,645
Thailand	12	—	—	—	—	—	1,231	2,403	3,871	4,522	5,137	5,259
United Kingdom	568	775	931	1,124	1,391	1,628	1,956	2,400	3,131	3,791	4,802	5,145
China	49	—	—	—	—	—	1,164	1,817	3,392	3,618	4,593	4,963
Ukraine	—	—	—	—	—	—	197	407	740	1,094	1,592	4,827
Kosovo	—	—	—	—	—	—	—	—	1,051	2,635	4,163	4,543
North Macedonia	—	—	—	—	—	—	1,075	1,524	1,993	2,620	3,670	4,242
United States	1,416	1,393	1,343	1,342	1,688	1,729	1,943	2,122	2,686	3,046	3,873	4,113
Serbia	—	—	—	—	—	—	—	33	1,474	2,480	3,699	3,974
Hungary	2,389	2,806	3,140	—	—	—	3,988	3,877	4,267	4,148	3,874	3,950
Somalia	1	—	—	—	—	—	1,282	1,365	2,435	3,569	3,991	3,839
Lithuania	—	—	—	—	—	—	166	710	1,701	2,517	3,333	3,556
Norway	2,501	2,672	2,562	2,555	3,037	2,759	2,860	3,106	3,146	3,331	3,382	3,428
Russia	483	572	623	678	930	885	661	1,222	1,717	2,236	2,767	3,358
Croatia	—	—	—	—	—	—	1,402	1,605	1,663	2,219	2,810	2,911

== Transport ==
The motorway built between Malmö and Lund in 1953 was the first motorway in Sweden. With the opening of the Öresund Bridge between Malmö and Copenhagen (the longest combined road and rail bridge in Europe) in 2000, the Swedish motorways were linked with European route E20 in Denmark, and the two countries' railway systems were physically connected. Before the bridge was built there were train ferries operated between Helsingborg and Helsingør. There are also train ferries to and from Germany and Poland.

Skåne has three major public airports, Malmö Airport, Ängelholm–Helsingborg Airport and Kristianstad Airport. One of the oldest airports in the world still in use is located in Skåne, namely Ljungbyhed Airport, in operation since 1910. Starting in 1926, the Swedish Air Force used the airport for flight training, and up until the military school was moved to the nearby Ängelholm F10 Wing in 1997, the airport was extremely busy. In the late 1980s, it was Sweden's busiest airport, with a record high of more than 1,400 take-offs and landings per day.

The major ports of Skåne are Trelleborg, Ystad, Åhus, Copenhagen Malmö Port, Landskrona Harbour and Helsingborg Harbour. Ferry connections across the Baltic Sea operate from several smaller ports as well.
