= Kristianstad County =

County in Sweden between 1719 and 1996

Coordinates: 56°01′50″N 14°09′30″E

Kristianstad County Kristianstads län
- County of Sweden
- 1719–1996
- Flag Coat of arms

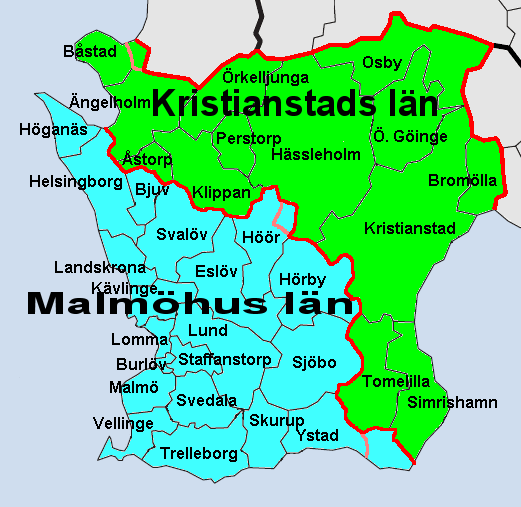
- Kristianstads län (Green) before 1997 within the current Skåne län
- Capital: Kristianstad
- History
  - Established: 1719
  - Disestablished: 31 December 1996
Succeeded by
Skåne County

Kristianstad County (Swedish: Kristianstads län) was a county of Sweden from 1719 to 31 December 1996 when it was merged with Malmöhus County to form Skåne County.

The seat of residence for the Governor was in Kristianstad.

== See also ==
- List of governors of Kristianstad County
- List of governors of Malmöhus County
- List of governors of Skåne County
- County Administrative Boards of Sweden
