= Gothenburg Municipality =

Gothenburg Municipality Göteborgs kommun
- Municipality
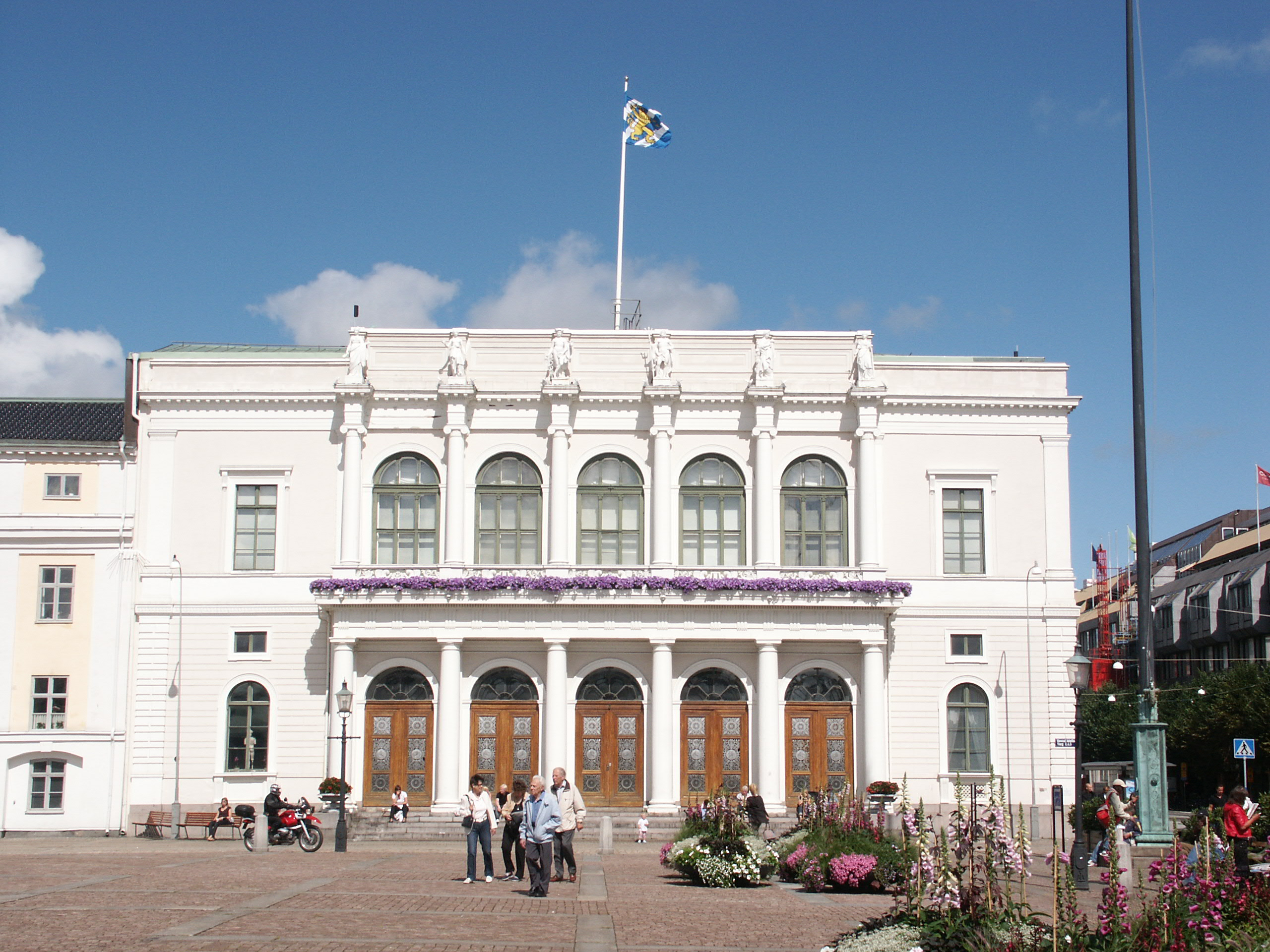
- Gothenburg City Hall

- Coat of arms

- Coordinates: 57°42′N 11°56′E
- Country: Sweden
- County: Västra Götaland County
- Seat: Gothenburg

Government
  - Mayor: Aslan Akbas (S)

Area
  - Total: 1,025.37 km^{2} (395.90 sq mi)
  - Land: 447.76 km^{2} (172.88 sq mi)
  - Water: 577.61 km^{2} (223.02 sq mi)
- Area as of 1 January 2014.

Population (May 2023)
  - Total: 600,559
  - Density: 1,341.3/km^{2} (3,473.8/sq mi)
- Time zone: UTC+1 (CET)
  - Summer (DST): UTC+2 (CEST)
- ISO 3166 code: SE
- Province: Västergötland and Bohuslän
- Municipal code: 1480
- Website: goteborg.se; goteborg.se - ENG short description; international.goteborg.se

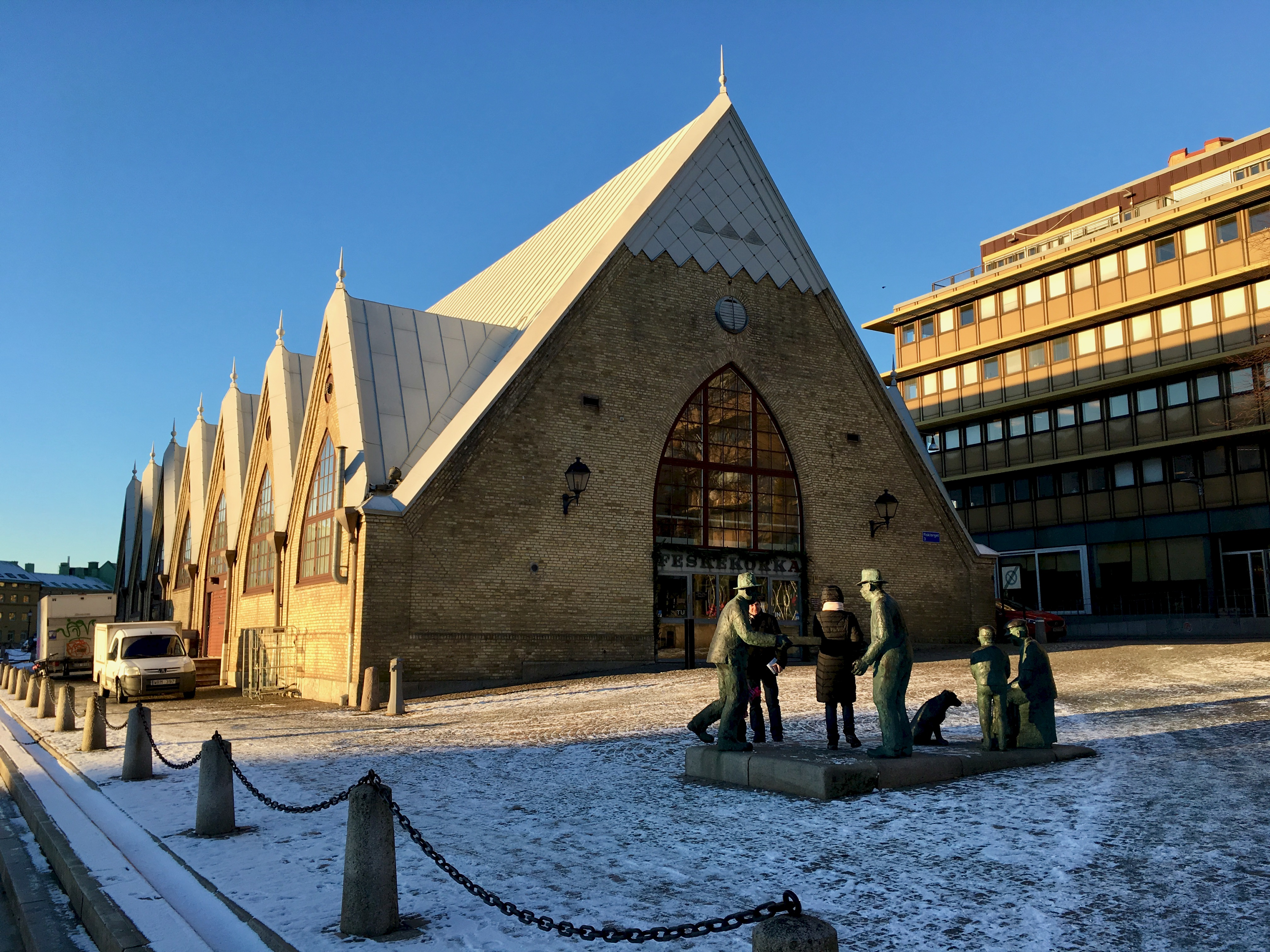
Gothenburg fish market

Gothenburg Municipality (Göteborgs kommun) or the City of Gothenburg (Göteborgs stad) is a municipality in Västra Götaland County in western Sweden. Its seat is located in the city of Gothenburg.

When the first Swedish local government acts were implemented in 1863 the City of Gothenburg, founded and chartered in 1621, became a city municipality with an elected city council (stadsfullmäktige). Its territory has since then been added through amalgamations in 1868, 1906, 1922, 1931, 1945, 1948, 1967 and 1974. The local government reform of 1971 made the city a unitary municipality, like all others in the country; however, the municipality prefers to style itself as Göteborgs stad ('City of Gothenburg') whenever legally possible.

In March 2018 it was reported that the municipality and municipality-owned companies had 236 employees working with public relations (Swedish: kommunikation), more than Stockholm, to a cost of 400 000 SEK daily or 151 million SEK annually.

== Localities ==
The major part of the Gothenburg urban area (Göteborgs tätort) is situated within the municipality, but there are also some other localities as well as rural areas.

- Billdal (part of)
- Donsö
- Hjuvik
- Nolvik
- Olofstorp
- Styrsö
- Torslanda
- Vrångö

=== Boroughs ===
In 1990 the municipality was subdivided into 21 stadsdelsnämnder (district boards), sometimes translated to boroughs, which they really are not. In 2009 the two district boards of Frölunda and Högsbo were joined. It has been decided that from the start of 2011 many more will be joined leaving 10 new district boards.

The boards carry responsibility for primary school, social, leisure, and cultural services within their respective areas. In the election of 1998 three boroughs (Askim, Torslanda and Älvsborg) held local referendums on forming their own municipalities, but their petitions were rejected by the government of Sweden.

Boroughs:

- Askim
- Angered
- Backa
- Bergsjön
- Biskopsgården
- Centrum
- Frölunda-Högsbo
- Härlanda
- Kortedala
- Kärra-Rödbo
- Linnéstaden
- Lundby
- Majorna
- Styrsö
- Torslanda
- Tuve-Säve
- Tynnered
- Älvsborg
- Örgryte

== Politics and government ==
The municipality has a municipal assembly (kommunfullmäktige), consisting of 81 members, elected for four years. The municipal assembly meets in the Bourse, a building located on Gustaf Adolfs torg. There are nine political parties represented in the council elected in 2022:

Name		Ideologies				
Name		Ideologies	Political alliance	Vote share	Seats	+/-
S	Swedish Social Democratic Party; Socialdemokraterna	Social democracy	Red-Green Coalition	26.4%	22 / 81	+5
M	Moderate Party; Moderaterna	Liberal conservatism	M–D–L–KD Coalition	17.1%	15 / 81	+3
V	Left Party; Vänsterpartiet	Socialism, Eco-socialism	Red-Green Coalition	15.8%	13 / 81	+2
SD	Sweden Democrats; Sverigedemokraterna	National conservatism, Right-wing populism	None	10.8%	9 / 81	+2
D	Democrats; Demokraterna	Liberal conservatism, Populism	M–D–L–KD Coalition	6.1%	5 / 81	-9
MP	Green Party; Miljöpartiet	Green politics	Red-Green Coalition	6.0%	5 / 81	-1
L	Liberals; Liberalerna	Liberalism, Conservative liberalism	M–D–L–KD Coalition	5.5%	5 / 81	-1
KD	Christian Democrats; Kristdemokraterna	Christian democracy, Conservatism	M–D–L–KD Coalition	4.2%	4 / 81	+1
C	Centre Party; Centerpartiet	Liberalism	None	4.0%	3 / 81	+-0
FI	Feminist Initiative; Feministiskt Initiativ	Feminism	None	0.8%	0 / 81	-2

After the 2022 election it was clear that the governing Alliance could not rule any longer with them winning only 27 seats in the chamber. Soon after the election the Centre Party announced they were starting negotiations with the Social Democrats (S), Left Party (V) and the Green Party (MP) about forming a majority coalition that could rule the city for the next four years. These negotiations broke down but S, V and MP could still take the power despite being a minority with only 40 out of 81 seats since C continues to refuse cooperation with the Sweden Democrats (SD).

There were ten political parties represented in the council elected in 2018:

Name		Ideologies				
Name		Ideologies	Political alliance	Vote share	Seats	+/-
S	Swedish Social Democratic Party; Socialdemokraterna	Social democracy	None	20.5%	17 / 81	-3
D	Democrats; Demokraterna	Liberal conservatism, Populism	None	17.0%	14 / 81	+14
M	Moderate Party; Moderaterna	Liberal conservatism	Alliance	14.5%	12 / 81	-8
V	Left Party; Vänsterpartiet	Socialism, Eco-socialism	Red-green-pink Coalition	12.6%	11 / 81	+3
SD	Sweden Democrats; Sverigedemokraterna	National conservatism, Right-wing populism	None	8.3%	7 / 81	+1
L	Liberals; Liberalerna	Liberalism, Conservative liberalism	Alliance	7.2%	6 / 81	-1
MP	Green Party; Miljöpartiet	Green politics	Red-green-pink Coalition	6.9%	6 / 81	-3
C	Centre Party; Centerpartiet	Liberalism	Alliance	4.0%	3 / 81	+3
KD	Christian Democrats; Kristdemokraterna	Christian democracy, Conservatism	Alliance	3.3%	3 / 81	+-0
FI	Feminist Initiative; Feministiskt Initiativ	Feminism	Red-green-pink Coalition	2.3%	2 / 81	-1

Following the 2018 municipal elections, neither traditional coalition of parties (the Alliance and the Red-Greens) was able to obtain a majority in the municipal assembly. The newly formed Democrats party, whose primary campaign promise is to stop the construction of the West Link, obtained 14 seats in the assembly, making it the second-largest party. The Green Party and the Left Party announced on 6 November that they would draft their own municipal budget together, along with Feminist Initiative – thus abandoning their traditional cooperation with the Social Democrats. This has been recognized as the three parties forming a local political alliance which has been referred to as the Red-green-pink coalition. As a result of this the Alliance were able to take the power in Gothenburg for the first time in nearly 30 years.

The municipal executive committee (kommunstyrelsen) has 13 members, representing the six parties from the two major political coalitions who have seats in the assembly.

The chairwoman of the municipal assembly is Åse-Lill Törnquist (MP) and the chairman of the municipal executive committee (sometimes titled mayor) is Jonas Attenius from the Social Democrats.

=== List of mayors ===
- Sören Mannheimer, (Social Democrats) 1985–1988
- Göran Johansson, (Social Democrats) 1988–1991
- Johnny Magnusson (Moderate Party), 1991–1994
- Göran Johansson (Social Democrats), 1994–2009
- Anneli Hulthén (Social Democrats), 2009–2014
- Ann-Sofie Hermansson (Social Democrats), 2014–2018
- Axel Josefson (Moderate Party), 2018–2022
- Jonas Attenius (Social Democrats), 2022–

== International cooperation ==
- Twin towns:
  - Bergen, Norway
  - Turku, Finland
  - Aarhus, Denmark
- Partner cities:
  - Nelson Mandela Bay, South Africa
  - Novi Sad, Serbia
  - Lyon, France

The cooperation with the South African Nelson Mandela Bay Metropolitan Municipality (established in 1998) is a partnership fostering development of common fields of interest such as solid waste management, public libraries, sport and tourism. Gothenburg had signed an agreement with Shanghai in 1986 which was upgraded in 2003 to include exchanges in culture, economics, trade and sport. However, the agreement was allowed to lapse in 2020.

- Sister cities:
  - Chicago, United States (since 1987)
  - Kraków, Poland
  - Tallinn, Estonia
  - Rostock, Germany
- Regional:
  - Oslo, Norway

== See also ==
- Gothenburg
- Gothenburg Law Court
