= History of Falkenberg =

History of a city in Sweden

The history of Falkenberg is, to a smaller or larger extent, known since the late 13th century, when the town starts to appear in written sources. The town might have taken over the position as a local power center from a location in Stafsinge. It was then Danish, and would remain so up till 1645, with some minor interruptions. From the 14th century and on to the Northern Seven Years' War (1563-1570) a second town, Ny-Falkenberg (New Falkenberg) was located close to the town. The fort from which the fiefdom had been run was destroyed by Engelbrekt Engelbrektsson's troops in 1434, and would not be rebuilt, hence marking the end of the fiefdom. The town gained its market rights in 1558.

Better infrastructure in the latter part of the 19th century, meant that the town break a long period of stagnation and see some substantial growth. The industrialisation process started at the late 19th/early 20th century. In the 20th century the town has continued to growth, both in terms of population and size. For the first time it has come to include areas on the southern strand of river Ätran.

== The middle ages ==
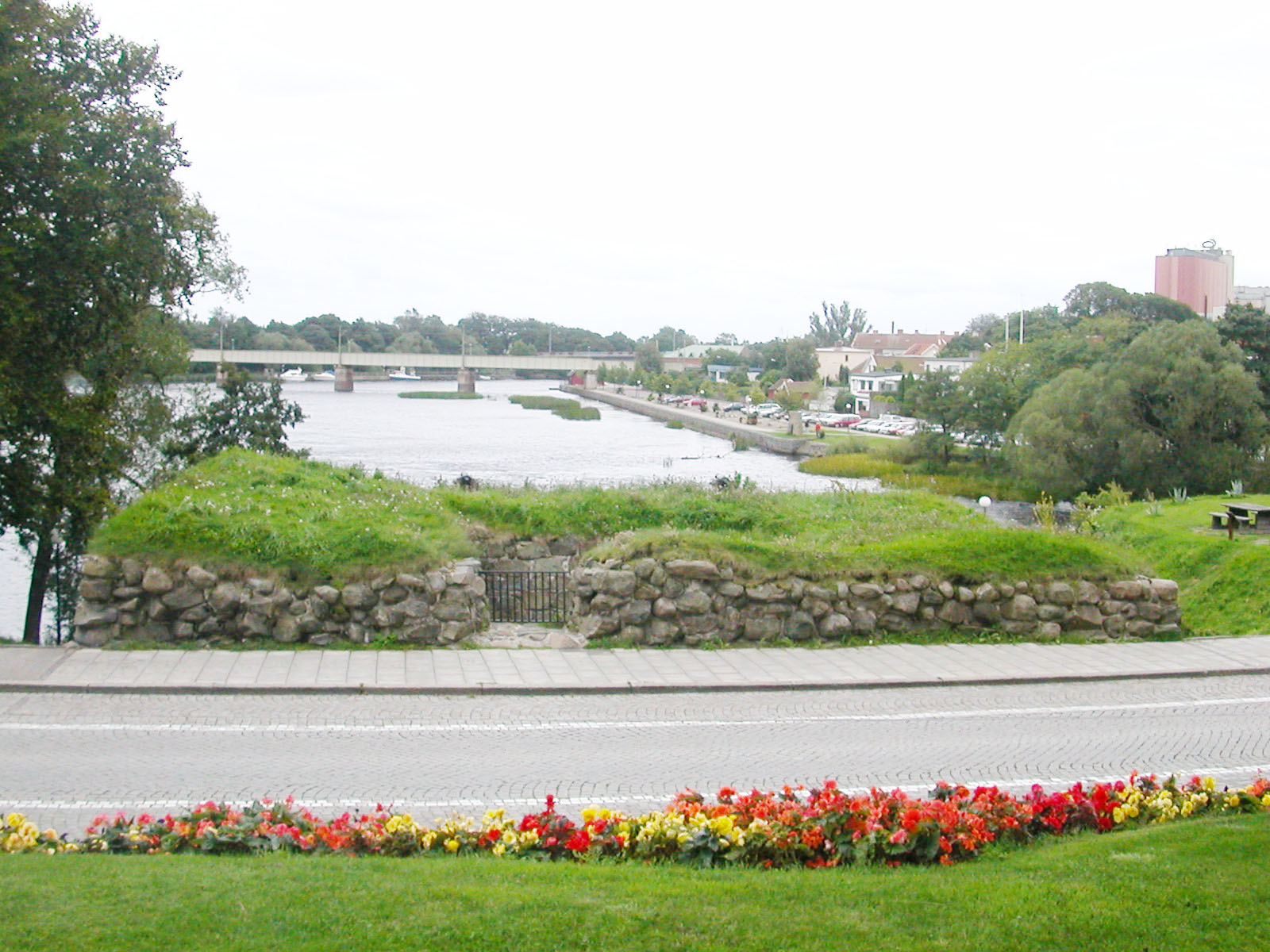
Only the foundation of the fort remains.

Year	Population
1770	551
1810	636
1850	953
1854	941
1890	1 760
1910	4 452
1930	5 604
1950	8 667
1970	13 476
1995	18 308
Source (mainly): CyberCity

In the late 13th century, the Danish king built a fort on the southern strand of river Ätran. It was given the name Falkenberg (Falcon + mountain), and would late give the town its name. It is not known wherefrom the fort got its name. What is known is that falconry has taken place in the area. Notes in Hallandia antiqua et hodierna, pointing out a specific hill as the Falcon mountain, is unverified.

The northern strand of the river was from time to time Norwegian or Swedish. There a trading centre known as Ätraby developed. Its church Saint Lawrence church, was built at around 1300. The settlement might have developed in competition with an earlier power center in Stafsinge. The settlement might have existed in 1256, as Haakon IV of Norway destroyed a market town (Kaupstadh) at river Ätran. Whether this market town was Falkenberg or the earlier power center is unknown.

Several royal meeting took place in or around Falkenberg in the late 13th/early 14th century. On these meetings marriages were negotiated. It was from Falkenberg that Christopher issued the market town rights for Halmstad.

The fort was destroyed by the men of Engelbrekt Engelbrektsson in 1434 and was not rebuilt. However, the trading centre took over its name. From the 14th century and on to the Northern Seven Years' War (1563-1570) a second town, Ny-Falkenberg (New Falkenberg), was located close to the town. Its main street was located where Tröingevägen is today, north east of the hospital.

== Modern period (-1860) ==
Year	Mayor
1444	Herman Röde
1446	Peder Bengtsen
dead 1592	Carl Jacobsen
1658-1664	Mickel Lauritzsson
1664-1680	Johan Larsson
1680-1686	Antonius (Tönnis) Gertsson Lubinus
1686-1705	Hans Gertsson Lubinus
1705-1709	Germund Skeppsgård
1709-1730	Gustav Dahlberg
1730-1748	Söhren Söhrensson
1748-1767	Johan Falckman
1767-1776	Arvid N. Boman
1776-1795	Peter Wallin
1795-1826	Johan Lagergren
1826-1853	Lars Bergström
1853-1912	Anders Magnus Lundberg
1912-1932	Bernt Wilmer Bengtsen

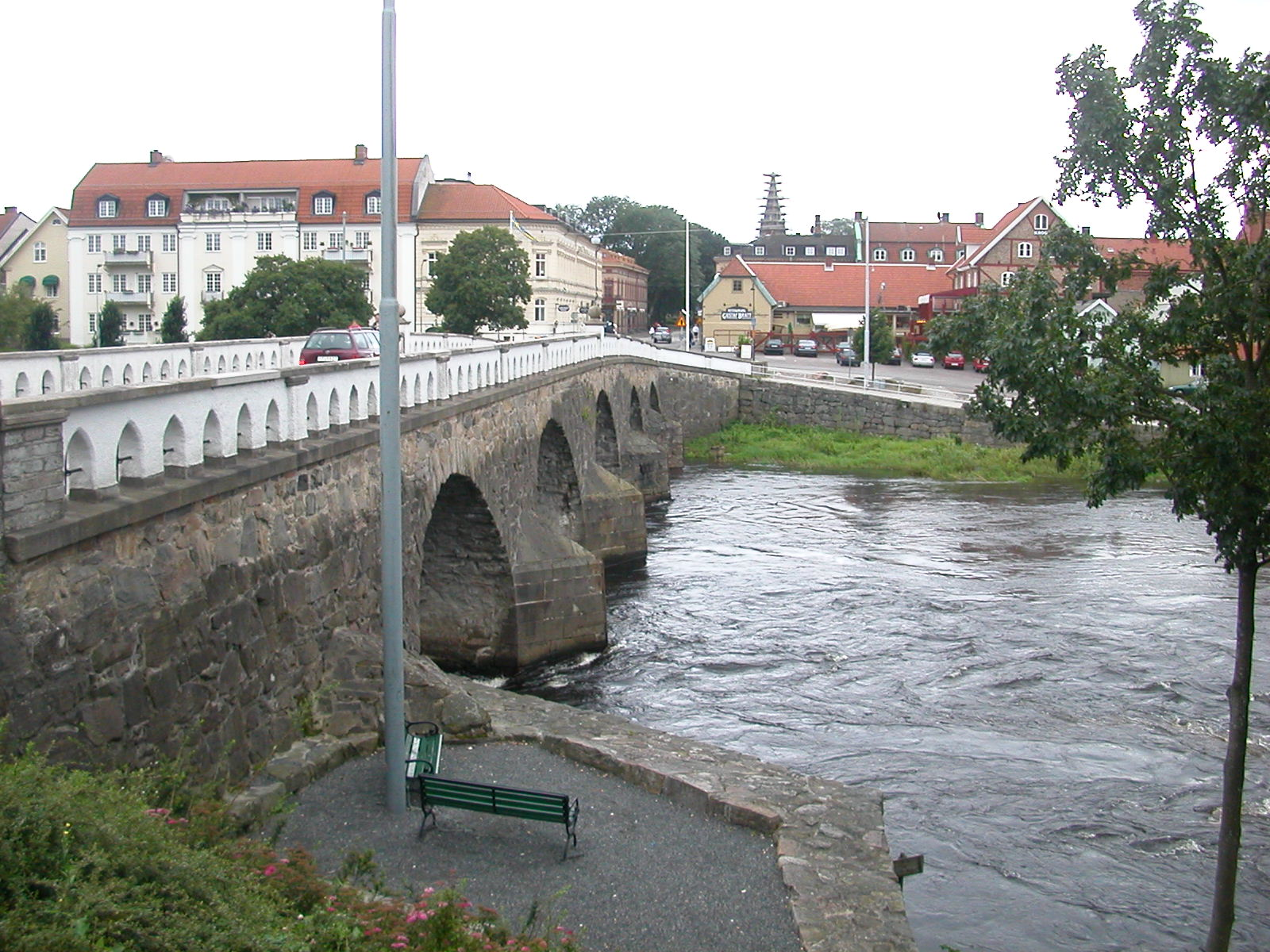
Falkenberg Bridge, a toll bridge, built in the 18th century.

Falkenberg was, together with the rest of the county, ceded to Sweden in the mid 17th century. By then, it had been heavily affected by the many wars which since the 13th century had ravaged the county. Christer Bonde, president of the Swedish National Board of Trade described it as a "minor stain", after his tour of inspection in the conquered territories. He was not alone. Several other notes from this time mentions the town in similar, unfavourable, words. The town had then, and would for quite some time, about 200 people, mainly working with farming. Farming and fishing continued to be the major trade in the town into the mid 19th century.

The Swedish state had an intention to limit the number of towns with the right to trade internationally (Sw. stapelstäder). Hence, the town lost these rights in 1660, had them returned in 1679 (during the Scanian War), and finally lost them again in 1724. A long battle with the state about the rights ensued. It would take until 1866 before the town regained the rights.

In 1660 the down suffered a major fire, in which 16 of the houses was lost. It was followed by several fires in the first half of the 18th century (1706, 1708, 1718, 1725, 1732 and 1743). As a result of all these fires, thatched roofs were forbidden. They were often replaced with brick roofs. The last major fire took place in 1841.

A register of the townspeople's occupations in 1737 reveals two bakers, a glassmaker, a gold smith, a gloves maker, a hat maker, a wheel maker, a copper smith, a potter, a mason, a painter,, three shoemakers, two tailors, a butcher, three smiths, four lumbermen, a weaver, four inn owners, twelve seamen and fishers and twelve workers. From the 18th century and onwards more and more potteries were built, the most well known Törngrens krukmakeri.

Salmon fishing has in all likelihood been carried out in river Ätran since ancient times. It is mentioned from the 16th century and onwards. Hallandia antiqua et hodierna describes it as the best in Halland. The good fishing-waters draw many Englishmen to the town in the 19th. This early tourism is described in Days in Falkenberg - A Record of Sport in Sweden, a book written in 1884 by A. M. Wilkinsson, a lawyer from London. Among those fishing were Sir Hyde Parker and a son to Thomas Babington Macaulay. At the end of the 19th century the town gained about one fifth of its revenue from the fishing. Nowadays the revenue from the fishing is estimated to be of the order of five million SEK.

The Falkenberg Bridge was built in the mid 18th century. The current town hall (Falkenbergs town hall) was built in 1826, although earlier town halls had existed at the same spot.

It was suggested in the early 1860s that the town should have a town council. Up until then the decisions had been made at assemblies, where all those attending and with a right to vote could do so. After some early opposition the town council was introduced in 1865.

== The town starts to grow (1860-) ==
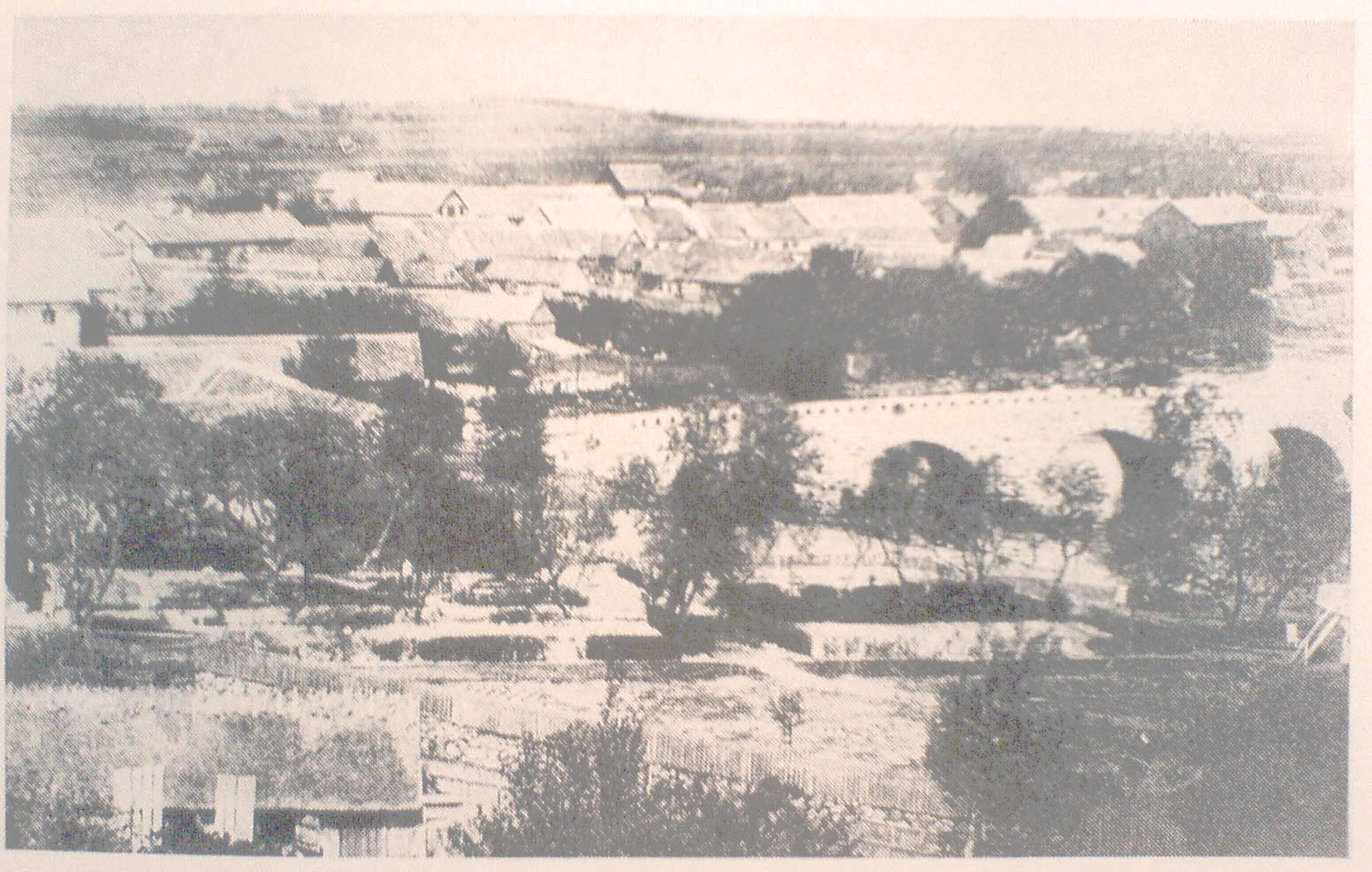
Photo of Falkenberg in the 1860s. Falkenberg Bridge can be found in the centre of the image.

From the 1820s and onwards action had been taken to improve the state of the Port of Falkenberg. In the mid 19th century the need for a better harbour became desperate. Hallands Ångbåtsaktiebolag (Halland Steamboat Inc.) had begun traffic along the westcoast, but refused to stop in Falkenberg, due to the poor state of the port. At the same time the importance of the port grew, as it was needed for the export of timber from the inland. The maximum depth in the harbour was 9 feet (2.7 metres), and it was only 6 feet (1.8 metres) at the quay. Hence, the boats often had to anchor at some distance out at sea, where the goods were transferred to smaller boats, which were able to use the harbour.

The limited depth was caused by sand drifting towards the harbour, due to underwater streams. In order to increase the depth a dredge was bought, at a cost of 9 000 Swedish riksdaler. Over the coming decades the dredge struggled to keep the depth. In 1890 the port once again lost the steamboat traffic. In 1909–1910 the northern wharf was extended and in the end of 1910 money was put up to build a 2,000 meter long breakwater and to extend the southern wharf. These projects took until 1926 to finish. These works proved successful, as the depth was increased to five meters and the dredge could be rented out.

The first plans for a railway between Falkenberg and Halmstad were discussed in 1881. As a result, Mellersta Hallands järnväg AB was formed, seated in Falkenberg. The stock company was successful in issuing stocks. With support by the Halland County Council and the state it would not only build the track, but also extend it to Varberg.

The work on the railway began in 1884, and in 1885 it reached Falkenberg. Two different stretches were suggested; one longer, northern, which would pass through the upper parts of Storgatan and Marknadsgatan; one short, southern, which would pass Tullkammaregatan and Storgatan. The latter alternative was cheaper and was chosen. As a consequence, the railway would pass through the remains of the old fort. The railway proved to be an economic success. When it was nationalised in 1895, it gave the town a return of 58 725 Swedish kronor on a 130 500 kronor investment.

The first telegraph station was opened in 1869. The town was connected to the national telephone grid in 1894. As the communications became better and better, the town gained a stronger role as the chief town for the surrounding countryside.

AB. Dan. Lundgrens leather factory was founded in 1834, and was for a long time one of the largest companies in the town. Bryggeriaktiebolaget Falken was founded in 1896, and has since been one of the largest employers in the town. Doktorspromenaden (The Doctor's Walk) was constructed in 1862.

The registers tell about barber-surgeons in the towns since the 17th century. From 1849 it had a town medical officer. The county council granted money for a cottage hospital in 1878, which was inaugurated four years later. The hospital facilities grew in numbers in the early 20th century, and in 1911 the county council decided to make it a general hospital, with a capacity of 34 beds.

The Herting mansion was bought by the town in 1901. The purchase was motivated by plans to build a hydro power plant; plans that were realized a few years later. The power plant has since been expanded step by step. Initially the power was too low to keep up with the demand, and the electricity had to be rationed. The problem was rectified by said expansions, as well as with the purchase of electricity from the Yngeredsfors power station, upstreams Ätran.

Following the threat of a cholera epidemic in 1892 an epidemic hospital was built in 1897. The building was used until 1925. It does nowadays belong to the Falkenbergs gymnasieskola and is known as the yellow villa. The building could not always host all the patients, and in those cases the Herting Sawmill was used to cater for the rest. Between 1925 and 1950 the epidemic hospital was located at Tallgläntan, however from 1933 and onwards it was for children only.

The 20th century has seen the town develop as a beach resort, in particular along Skrea Strand. By 1914 it had 14 cabins, by 1928 it had increased to 300 and nowadays there are about 1,600. From the 1930s and onwards some restaurants and a hotel has been established in the area to cater for the needs of the tourists.

The town begun to expand administratively in 1907 when Herting was incorporated, albeit with protests from Skrea, to which it had previously belonged. Further incorporation took place in 1936–1937, when Arvidstorp, become a part of the town. In that case the feelings had been the opposite, as Arvidstorp had struggled for over 20 years to become part of the town. In 1950 a minor part of Vinberg was transferred to the town and in 1951-1952 the incorporation of Skrea took place. As a result of the 1971 municipal reform the town is now the seat of Falkenberg Municipality. A new town hall was built in 1960.

Falkenbergs Football Club was founded in 1894 as the town's first major sports club. It was followed in 1906 by Falkenberg Women Gymnastics Club. Falkenberg Arena was built in 1921. Falkenbergs FF was founded in 1928 and Falkenbergs BTK in 1925. In the 1940s and 1950s a heated debate took place on whether to broad the old Falkenberg Bridge or not. The matter was taken to national level and as a result it was decided to leave the bridge untouched, but increase its capacity by building a footbridge, thereby leaving the entire bridge to the cars, without the need to share it with the pedestrians.
