= Falkenberg (disambiguation) =

Falkenberg is a locality and the municipal seat of Falkenberg Municipality, Sweden.

Falkenberg or Falkenbergs may also refer to:

== Places ==
=== Germany ===
- Falkenberg/Elster, a town in the district Elbe-Elster, Brandenburg
- Falkenberg, Märkisch-Oderland, a town in the district Märkisch-Oderland, Brandenburg
- Falkenberg (Berlin), a locality in the borough of Lichtenberg, Berlin
- Falkenberg, Lower Bavaria, a town in the district of Rottal-Inn in Bavaria
- Falkenberg (Lüneburg Heath), a hill on the Lüneburg Heath in Lower Saxony
- Falkenberg, Upper Palatinate, a town in the district of Tirschenreuth in Bavaria
- Falkenberg, Saxony-Anhalt, a town in the district of Stendal in Saxony-Anhalt
- Falkenberg, a place in Lilienthal, Lower Saxony
- Falkenberg, a village in Wabern, Germany

=== Sweden ===
- Falkenberg Municipality, a municipality in Halland County
- Falkenberg (fort), a fort in Falkenberg

=== Elsewhere ===
- Faulquemont, France, formerly in Alsace-Lorraine and known in German as Falkenberg
- Jastrzębniki, West Pomeranian Voivodeship, Poland, formerly in Pomerania and known in German as Falkenberg
- Monfalcone, Friuli-Venezia Giulia, Italy, formerly in the Province of Gorizia and known in German as Falkenberg
- Niemodlin, Poland, formerly in Silesia and known in German as Falkenberg
- Sokolec, Lower Silesian Voivodeship, Poland, formerly in Silesia and known in German as Falkenberg
- Sokolniki, Goleniów County, Poland, formerly in Pomerania and known in German as Falkenberg

== Sports ==
- Falkenbergs BTK, a Swedish table tennis club
- Falkenbergs FF, a Swedish football club
- Falkenbergs VBK, a Swedish volleyball club
- Falkenbergs IP, a football stadium
- Falkenbergs Motorbana, a motor racing circuit in Bergagård, Sweden

== Other uses ==
- Falkenberg (surname)
- Battle of Falkenberg, 1630 battle
- John Christian Falkenberg, a main character in The Prince tetralogy of science fiction war novels
- Falkenberg Bridge, a stone arch bridge in Falkenberg, Sweden
- Falkenbergs gymnasieskola, a secondary school in Falkenberg, Sweden
- Falkenberg railway, a former railway that connected Falkenberg and Limmared, Sweden

== See also ==
- Falkenberg-Höhe, a municipal federation in the district of Märkisch-Oderland, Brandenburg
- Falkenberg's Restrepia, the common name for Restrepia falkenbergii, an epiphytic orchid
- Falkenbergs Tidning, a former Swedish conservative newspaper
- Falkenburg (disambiguation)
