= Sumpafallen =

Nature reserve in Sweden

Coordinates: 57.0957°N 12.6738°E

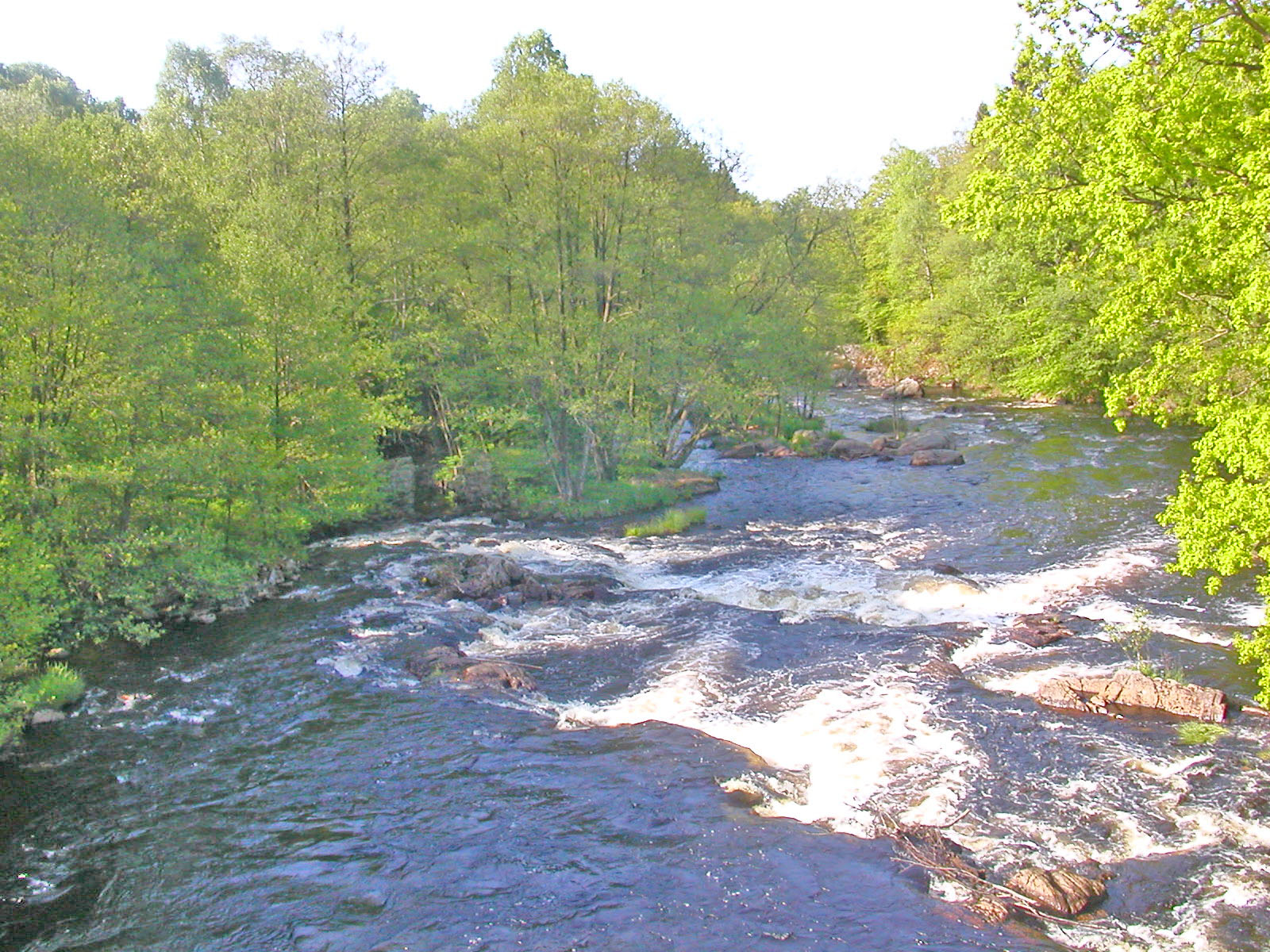

Sumpafallen is a nature reserve in Sweden, located along Högvadsån, a tributary to river Ätran. The reserve has an area of 56 hectares and is situated in Falkenberg Municipality. It is classified as being of national interest with regards to conservation.

Apart from the river with its rapids, the reserve consist of mainly broadleaf forest and pasture. Alternate-leaved golden saxifrage, anemone hepatica and paris quadrifolia are among the species found in the reserve. Freshwater pearl mussel, salmon and brown trout are found in the river.
