= Falkenberg Bridge =

Bridge in Falkenberg, Sweden

Coordinates: 56°54′11″N 12°29′40″E

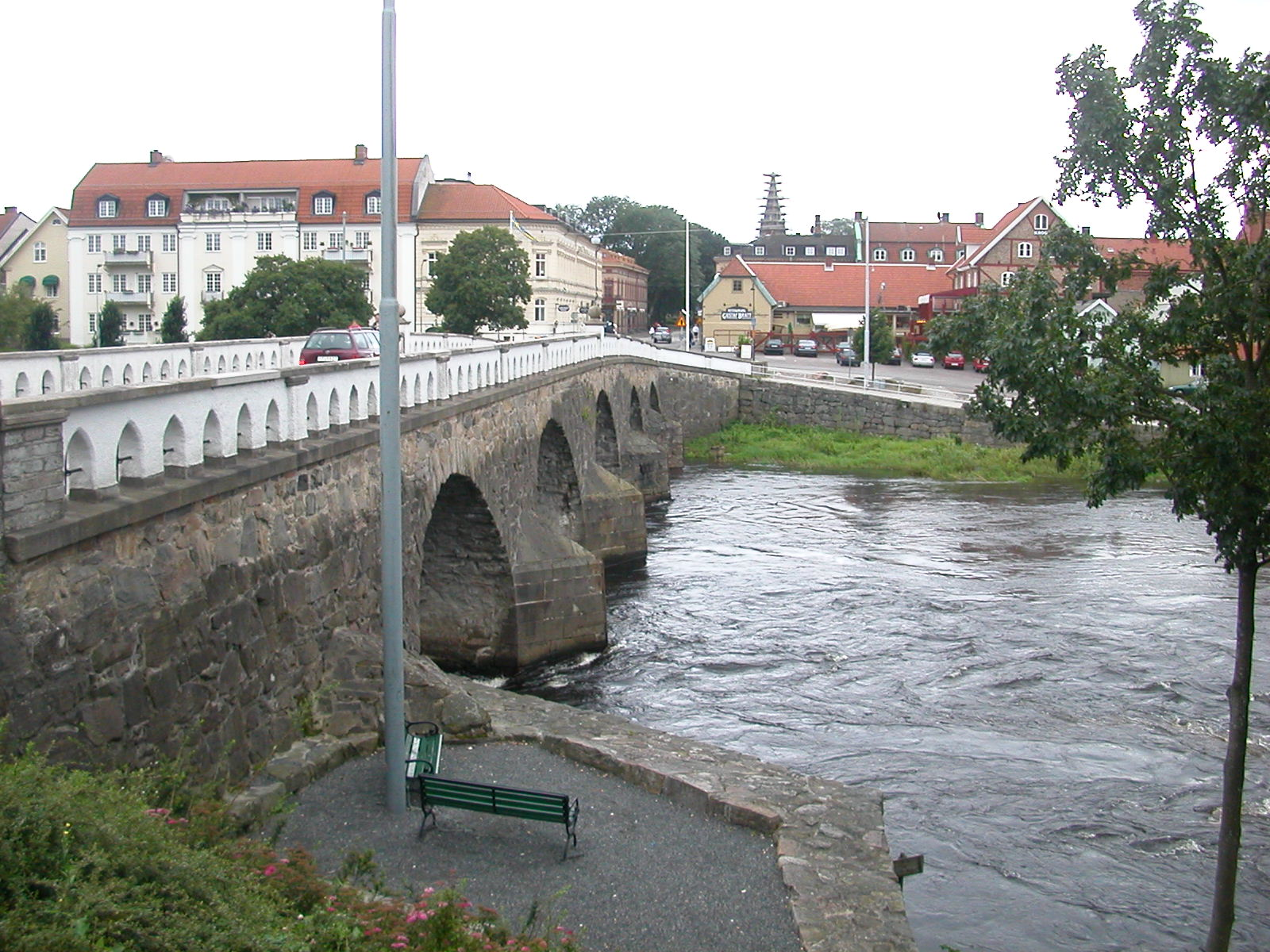
The Falkenberg Bridge seen from south east

The Falkenberg Bridge (Swedish Tullbron, literally "The Toll Bridge") is a stone arch bridge in Falkenberg, Sweden, built between 1756 and 1761. The bridge spans the Ätran river and is a listed building since 1984. It underwent major repair and restoration works in 1927 and 1994. The bridge is still in use and is used by an average of 3,800 vehicles a day. It was a toll bridge until 1914. The ruin of the fort Falkenberg is located close to the bridge, at the southern strand. The bridge has given its name to the nearby Tullbroskolan high school.

== Predecessors ==
The bridge had an upstream predecessor, close to Nybyhemmet. It was part of the medieval town of Ny-Falkenberg. Remains of the bridge can still be observed at the stream bed. Following the destruction of Ny-Falkenberg, a new bridge was built, located close to the current clinic. Boulders from its holdings are still visible. The last predecessor was built in 1725. On that bridge toll was taken from 1739 and onwards. The bridges were previously maintained by the people in Årstad och Faurås Hundred. One of these bridges was destroyed during the war year 1565. That forced the Danish Army to use the ford at Axtorna, upstreams, where the Swedish Army waited, and the Battle of Axtorna took place.

== The construction process ==
County governor Hans Hummelheim was responsible for the infrastructure in the county and found a need for a stone bridge over the Ätran river. The bridge was drawn by architect Carl Hårleman, and passed all necessary authorities by 1752. When Hårleman died in 1753 and his job was taken over by Carl Cronstedt. He changed the construction, increasing the number of arches from four to five. The construction work was led by Fridrich August Rex and performed by the soldiers of Älvsborg and Västgöta-Dal regiment.

A meeting with those involved took place in 1753. The original plans were to build the bridge at the same position as the previous one. August Rex considered that place unsuitable and suggested the place at which it later was built. The new location had a better bedrock, although the river was wider. They wrote a contract in 1755 and construction started in July 1756.

The total cost for the construction of the bridge was 34,258 Swedish riksdaler. Källstorp in Slöinge supplied the stones, while the wood came from Fagered. Fridrich August Rex wrote a personal journal during the construction work, which was published as part of the book "Tullbron i Falkenberg - Dess byggnad och historia från 1753 till vår tid".

== Later history ==
A toll house was built next to the bridge. It was rented out six years at a time. The owner paid a fee to the state and maintained the bridge, while getting the money from the toll. The house included a pub. It stayed within one family from the mid 19th century and onwards. It was later used for a wide range of purposes, such as hosting the press of Falkenbergs Tidning, during its first years. The house was demolished in 1933. The toll was only paid by travelers going north; the people living in Årstad and Faurås paid half price.

The bridge was repaired in 1783 and 1787, as well as, to a minor degree, in 1876. Falkenberg Town was allowed to take over the ownership of the bridge in 1912, on condition that they repaired it. It took until 1920 before they formally gained ownership. The town scrapped the toll, first for the townspeople and later for all travelers. Thorough repair works took place between May and September 1927 by Skånska Cement. During the work a temporary bridge was constructed to the north of the bridge. The total cost for the repairs was 97,400 Swedish kronor, of which the town paid 34,000, while the rest was paid by state subsidies and money taken from the car tax.

The traffic over the bridge grew, as the town grew south of the river, and Skrea strand became a popular beach. Hence, the city council decided in June 1939 to widen the bridge, from 7.2 meters (24 ft) to 13.5 meters (44 ft). The decision was the start of the "bridge broadening dispute". It was suggested to build a bridge close to Garvareforeforsen as an alternative to widen the bridge. The matter was discussed locally and at the national level as well. Among those who wanted to leave the bridge unchanged were Ernst Wigforss and Fredrik Ström. That faction invited king Gustav V, who was quoted saying "It would be a pity to broaden that bridge".

The matter went through the authorities. The city council decided three times that the bridge should be broadened. The final decision was to build a temporary footbridge next to the bridge in 1955. Since vehicles had shared the bridge with the pedestrians, the actual width available to the vehicles increased. The decision followed a ruling by the government in December 1954 to outlaw any major changes to the bridge due to its cultural value.

One of the most important transport routes in Sweden, National Road 2, used the bridge until 1962. That year the road was renamed E6 and got a new route just outside the town, as a new bridge was built over the Ätran river. Later, another bridge has been built over Ätran, Söderbron. The temporary footbridge has been demolished.

== Sources ==
- Skantze, Anna, Rex, Fredrich August och Lundahl, Ernst (1971). Tullbron i Falkenberg - Dess byggnad och historia från 1753 till vår tid (in Swedish). Falkenberg.
