= Falkenberg Old Town Hall =

Former town hall in Falkenberg, Sweden

Coordinates: 56°54′14.76″N 12°29′28.91″E

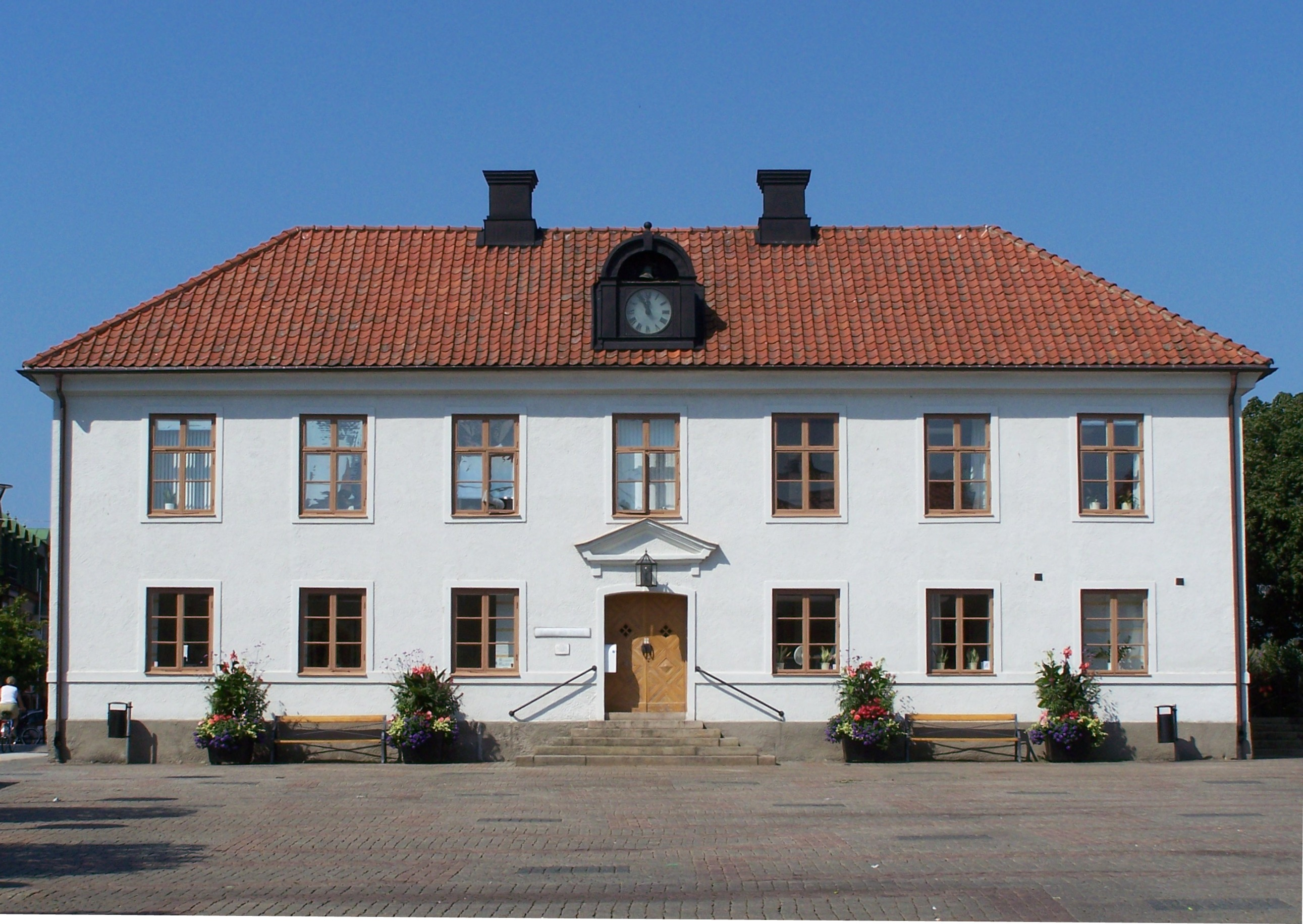
Falkenbergs rådhus is currently used by the city council for administrative purposes

Falkenberg Old Town Hall (Swedish Falkenbergs rådhus) is a former town hall, built 1826. The building has given name to the adjacent square, Rådhustorget.

The first town hall was built in 1760. It was a relatively small wooden house. The town centre was at that time located further south, around Saint Lawrence church. However, during the following centuries the centre would move north, giving the town hall a fairly central location.

The building became increasingly run-down and was also too small for its purpose. It was therefore decided to build a new town hall. The building had two storeys. The lower was shared between Falkenberg's first school, Pedagogien, its head teacher's dwelling, the town's jail, fire equipment, weights and measures. The upper storey contained a session hall as well as a ballroom.

The parts of the lower storey not used by the school became by time increasingly used by the police. A major refurbishment took place 1872–1874. Pedagogien was closed down 1 July, 1893 and replaced by an elementary schoolthat used the building until 1906. A minor extension was added in 1913.

The ballroom was used as session room by the town's council between 1901 and 1946, whereafter it was used as an office. Upon the completion of Falkenberg Town Hall, the building was used as a police station. It has been used for administrative purposes by the municipality since 1972.
