= Jan Widströmer =

Swedish artist

- Born: 31 December 1944 (age 81); Malmbäck, Sweden
- Website: widstromer.net

Jan Widströmer (born 31 December 1944) is a Swedish artist.

== Early life and education ==
Widströmer's father was a primary school teacher and a founder of a school for adults of which he was the headmaster; his mother was a piano teacher. Widströmer continued his university studies in English language and literature and basics of the North Germanic languages, focusing on the history of culture, art and literature.

By the end of the 1970s, Widströmer moved to Falkenberg in the county of Halland with his wife.

== Artworks ==
In 1980, Widströmer's first solo exhibition was presented at the local gallery. It was a success which caused much interest and curiosity; especially as his work was quite different from the other local artists in those days. Since then he has exhibited his art through the years on different locations in Sweden as well as in other countries. Between 1984 and 1993, he was also successful as an art critic, and composed literary and cultural articles for the Hallandsposten – the largest circulated newspaper in the county of Halland by then.

By the millennium, Widströmer's art turned more musical as he found a more elaborate style for subtle expressions of music and spirituality. One might also say that his art turned more spiritual.

The movement of the west wind in the grass and the movement of the waves, first carefully studied in a series of pencil drawings, finally gave the basic linear rhythm that is now a main characteristic of my recent paintings. My earlier works often have a sharper edged geometry (when not turning entirely to realism and intricate symbolism.) My art is a voyage always finding new shores.

My art is spiritual. My art is hymns of music in color. My art is poetry without words.

In 2009, Widströmer also returned to the style of his early 1980s in a series of paintings; to what he calls his "emblematism", back then mainly drawings in ink. Some of those drawings illustrated his book of poetry, published in 1983, called "Boken till Dig" ("A Book for You"). Now colors, figures as well as background forms make his symbolism into an intriguing drama.

== Poetry ==
In 2010, Widströmer started publishing his poems online, thus enabling a much broader audience to take part of his poetry.

== Fred Andersson's Biography ==
In 2019, Fred Andersson, adjunct professor at Åbo Akademi University, published an extensive and learned surveil and analysis of Widströmer's art from the 1970s till today's latest paintings with its lyrical and geometrical interpretations of inner and outer life and music.

Included is an essay on Widströmer's poetry from the 1980s till today by Niclas Schiöler, adjunct professor at Lund University.

Publisher: Palmkron (Lund) Summary in English.
