= Törngrens krukmakeri =

Pottery in Falkenberg, Sweden

Coordinates: 56°54′0″N 12°29′42″E

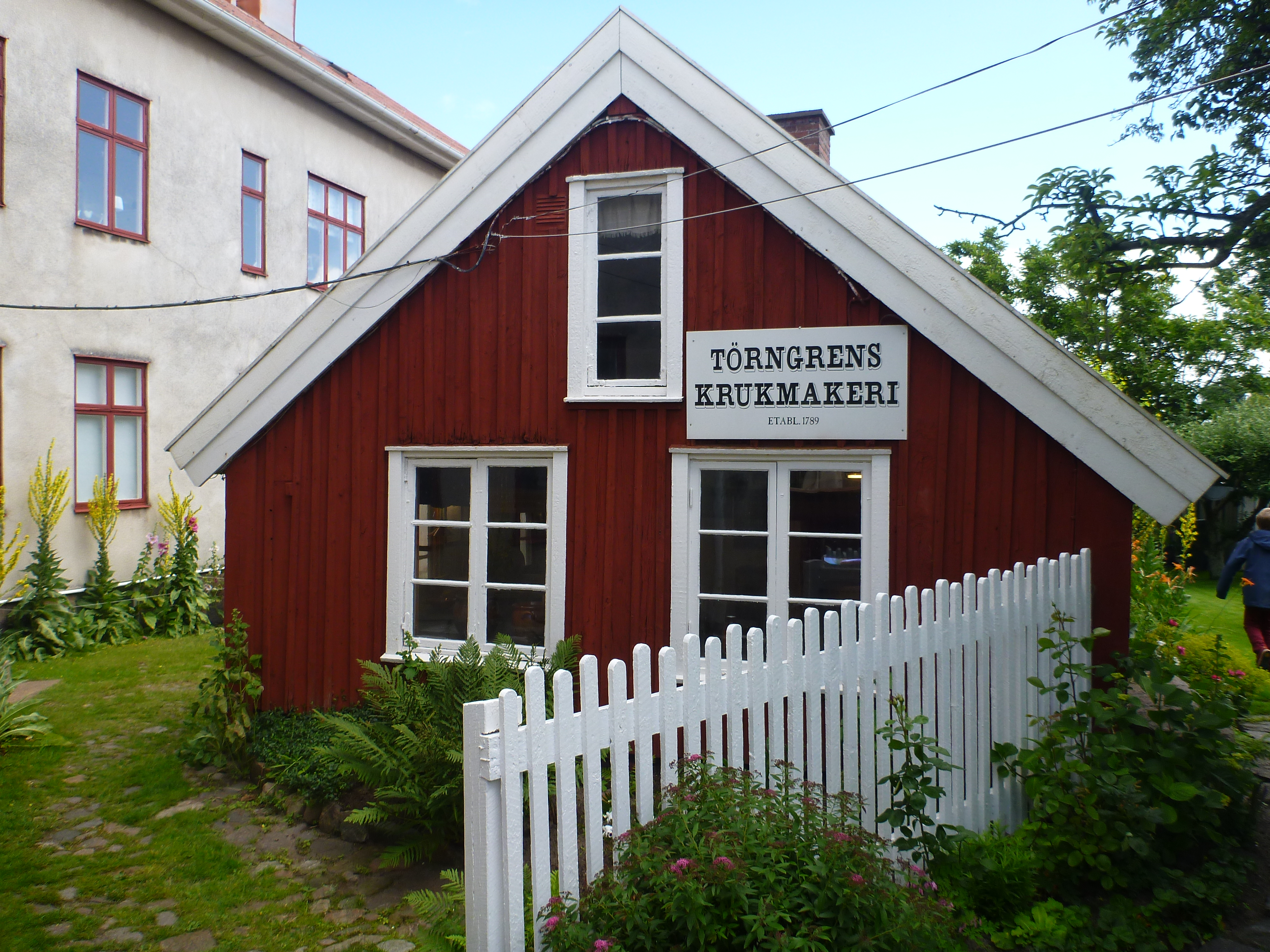
Main building of the pottery

Törngrens krukmakeri is a pottery in Falkenberg, Sweden, in a backyard of Krukmakaregatan, close to the river Ätran. It was founded in 1789 and claims to be one of the oldest, still manufacturing, potteries in Europe. The pottery is still in the ownership of the same family, now in its seventh generation.

Since 2014 there is no continuous production, as the last potter, Bengt Törngren, retired

A little display in the old shop shows some exhibits from the history of the company, free of charge.
