= Frölunda (disambiguation) =

Frölunda is the borough Västra Frölunda in the city of Gothenburg, Sweden.

Frölunda or Västra Frölunda may also refer to:

== Gothenburg, Sweden ==
- Frölunda Parish, a parish in the Diocese of Gothenburg
- Frölunda Torg, a shopping centre
- Frölundaborg or Campus Frölunda, an ice hockey arena

== Sport ==
- Frölunda HC or Frölunda Indians, formerly Västra Frölunda HC, an ice hockey team from Gothenburg
- Västra Frölunda IF, a football club from Gothenburg
- Västra Frölunda IF Handball, a handball club from Gothenburg

== See also ==
- Östra Frölunda, a village in Svenljunga Municipality, Västra Götaland County, Sweden
