= Hallands Nyheter =

Swedish newspaper

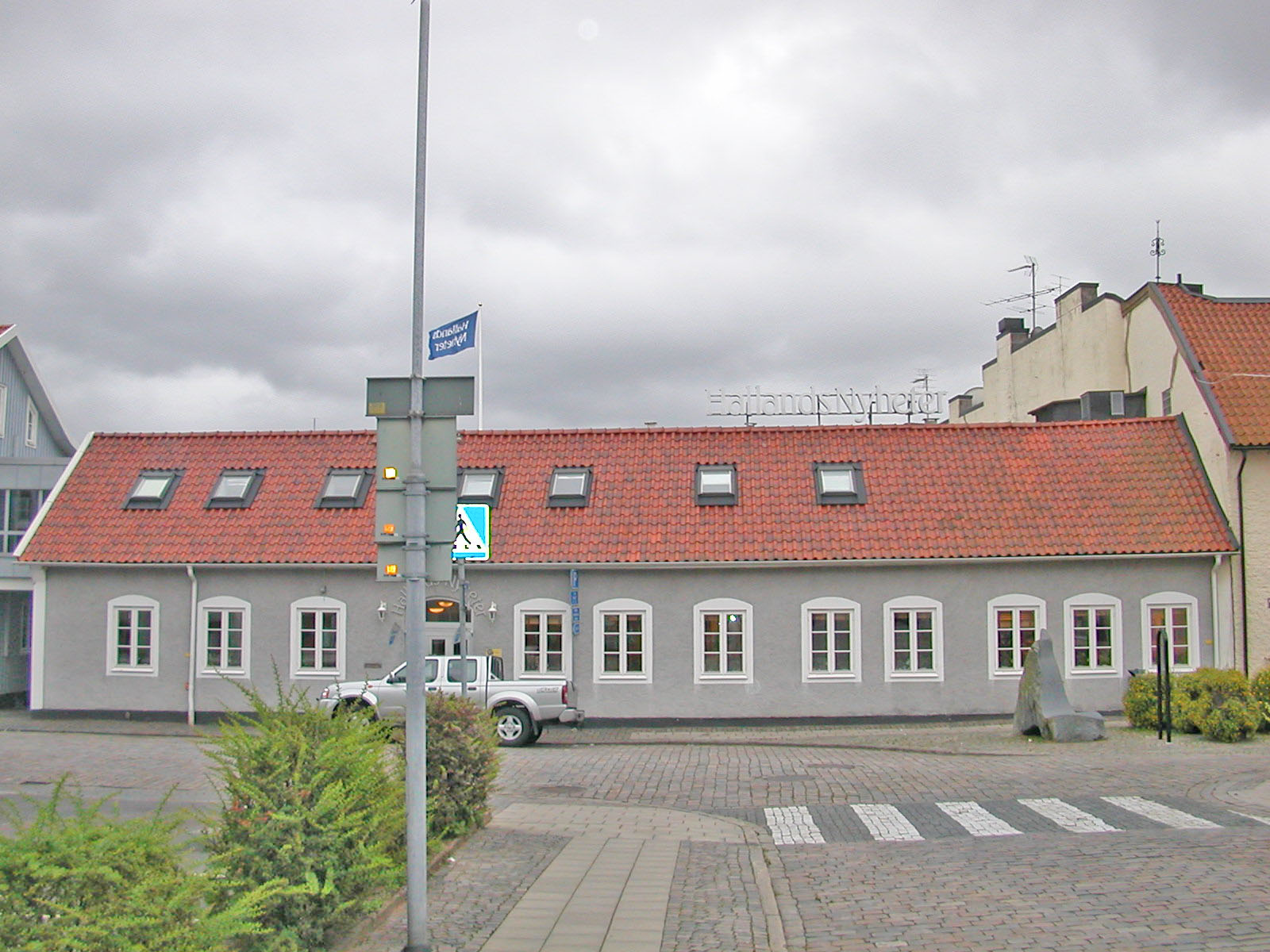
- The current main office
- Type: Daily newspaper
- Format: Tabloid
- Owner: Stampen
- Editor: AnnaKarin Lith
- Founded: 1905; 121 years ago
- Political alignment: Centre Party
- Language: Swedish
- Headquarters: Storgatan 22, Falkenberg, Sweden
- Circulation: 31,600
- Sister newspapers: Hallandsposten
- Website: www.hn.se

Hallands Nyheter is a Swedish newspaper, founded by Artur Lagerihn in 1905. The newspaper is published in Falkenberg. It has a daily circulation of 31,600 and is owned by Stampen AB. The editorial page supports Centerpartiet. It is printed six days a week, daily except Sunday.

The paper employs about 150 people and has annual revenue of 130 million Swedish kronor. Bengt Wendle is the CEO, while AnnaKarin Lith is chief editor. It is mainly distributed in the municipalities of Falkenberg and Varberg, where over 70% of the households subscribe. The paper has editorial offices in Falkenberg, Varberg, Kungsbacka and Halmstad. It is distributed as a talking magazine as well.

Stampen AB bought it from Centertidningar AB in 2005. Originally published under the label Falkenbergs-Posten, it changed its name to Hallands Nyheter in 1919.

== History ==
The newspaper started as Falkenbergs-Posten and was initially an advertising brochure. It was set up by a printer, Artur Lagerihn, who published the first issue on 2 October 1905. Before that, he had printed three specimen copies, starting on 13 September. The paper changed form to become a usual newspaper after just a few copies. It was then printed three times a week: Mondays; Wednesdays and Fridays. The paper had four pages. It was distributed by post on the countryside, while townspeople could either get it at specified places, or pay a bit extra and get it delivered. Falkenbergs-Posten was a liberal paper, in opposition to its competitor, the large Falkenbergs Tidning, which was conservative.

Nils Bierke become joint owner on 18 December. He was the chief editor of the paper during two periods, until 1909. The paper suffered from bad finances and in 1907 it became a corporation. Several of the town's businessmen bought shares and become board members. In 1908 Artur Lagerihn got sick and Gustav Adolf Janson (usually written Gustav Ad. Janson) took over the authorization to issue the newspaper. Nils Bierke left the paper. On 4 January it started to use modern Swedish spelling. The financial problems were however still there. In 1909 it issued preference shares, that was however not enough, and the paper had to declare bankruptcy

=== Reconstruction ===
The paper was reconstructed by three of its former owners: A T Törngren; Julius Månsson and A Andersson. The first copy was printed on 26 November 1909. Filip Pärson held the post as chief editor, and would continue to do so until 1927.

In November 1911, Filip Pärson's wife, Tekla Pärson, took over as owner together with Gustav Ad. Jansson. Filip could himself not stand as owner as he had been involved in an earlier bankruptcy. From 1912 the paper would be published at Tuesdays, Thursdays and Saturdays. The reason for the change was that it fitted better with the post distribution, and the days were those on which Falkenbergs Tidning was published as well.

=== The farmer's movement gets involved ===
The recently formed National Farmers Union (Jordbrukarnas Riksförbund) want a newspaper in Halland. At the annual meeting on 28 May 1919 it was decided that the possibility of getting a mean of influencing the press in Halland should be investigated. As a consequence a company, owned by individuals within the farmer's movement, bought the paper. The goal was to make it a paper of the entire county.

In December 1919, the paper therefore changed its name to Hallands Nyheter (News of Halland). The paper had until then been a paper of the countryside of Falkenberg Municipality. It would take considerable time before that would to start to change. In the town Falkenbergs, Tidning still ruled.

A few years after the takeover, it became formally owned by the Farmers' League, a successor of the National Farmers Union. By becoming owned by the farmer's movement the paper not only got more money into the company, it also gained from the contact net of the movement to receive news.

The financial situation did however continue to be worrying. They did not succeed in widening is distribution area. As of 1926 it had a circulation of 2,000. This led the Farmer's League to sell the paper back to its CEO and former owner, Gustaf Adolf Janson. Janson not only got ownership of the paper, he became the new editor in chief. A deal was struck between Janson and the farmer's movement. The movement promised to continue to support the paper by subscribing, advertising etc. if the paper continued wear their stamp.

The company saw a turn for the better when the printer was commissioned to print Halländska Lantmannatidningen the same year. Although small in size it had, in the 1940s, a circulation of 20,000, hence giving the company a much needed stable source of income. The financial situation was brightened further when it was commissioned to print SLU-bladet in 1930. SLU-bladet was the membership paper of the Farmer's League's youth organisation.

=== The paper establish itself in Varberg ===
Starting 12 August 1930 the paper was printed by a new printer, replacing one used from the foundation. In 1931 it started printing on Mondays, hence printing four editions a week. The move was caused by a similar move taken by Falkenbergs Tidning a year earlier.

Another important change occurred the same year. The paper established a new editorial office in the neighboring town of Varberg. After a tough start, it grew partly because of the local editor in chief, Axel E Blixt, a man with good connections with the farmer's movement. Pressure from the farmer's movement had been the deciding factor behind the expansion.

The Hallands Nyheter, as well as the farmer's movement, had been offered to buy one of the newspapers in the town, Norra Hallands Tidning Vestkusten. Neither the paper, nor the movement, were interested. The new office did have some tough first years, as the Union of Merchants boycotted the new paper until 1937. The paper continued to grow, especially on the surrounding countryside. It has held a dominating position in Varberg since the 1970s.

The paper was distributed six days a week from 1939. The paper switch from mid day to morning publication in response to the same move by Falkenbergs Tidning. The circulation increased, as of 1939 it was 7,295 copies, six years later it was 10,825.

The paper bought a new printer in 1943. The purchase fueled some controversy, as it originally belonged to a Norwegian paper that had been taken over by the Nazis during the war, Bergens Aftenblad. Göteborgs Handels- och Sjöfartstidning, Göteborgs-Posten and Falkenbergs Tidning all hinted that they had been able to buy the printer at a too low price, as Norway was occupied by Germany.

The old one was sold to Laholms tidning. A close cooperation between the papers was established, much due to the shared connection with the farmer's movement. The papers shared came to share a lot of their content with other.

While Hallands Nyheter did well during the war and the years that followed, the same was not true for its competitors. Norra Hallands Tidning Vestkusten and Varbergs Posten, located in Varberg, as well as Falkenbergs Tidning, were all shut down and replaced by another conservative paper, Hallands Dagblad. That paper in turn shut down in 1959. The growth of Hallands Nyheter meant that the political profile was softened.

=== Technical development and new owners ===
The paper bought a cliché machine in 1954. The machine meant that they could print much more photos, and in 1956 the paper got its first full-time employed photograph. The same year a teleprinter was installed. In 1964 the paper brought a new printer, this time from a Danish paper, Næstved Tidende. The printer was put into use in 1966.

Hallands Nyheter was reorganised as a joint stock company in 1958. Gustav Ad. Janson continued to be the majority shareholder, while his wife and children became the owners of the remaining stocks. When Janson died in 1963, his son Gustav Janson took over as CEO, while Thure Mattsson became the chief editor.

Between 1962 and 1966 (and later from 1980 and 1989) the paper had a local office in Getinge. By 1965 an office was opened in Halmstad and in 1966 another office was opened in Kungsbacka. By the late 1960s and the 1970s the paper's finances worsened. Centertidningar AB bought a majority stake in the company in 1975. Arvid Johansson took over as chief editor 1977.

The paper begun with phototypesetting and direct lithography in 1977. A new printer was bought in 1981. Following the new printer the format was changed to berliner and the office was upgraded, to be able to handle the introduction of computers. Failed negotiations on a shared printer were held with Hallandsposten.

Until 1982, Halland Nyheter had advertisements on its front page. The same year, the office in Varberg moved to new facilities, while a new office was opened in Fegen. In 1986 the paper bought another local printing company, ABC-tryck. The company started to print Laholms tidning in 1988. In 1989, for the first time, more than 30,000 copies of Hallands Nyheter were distributed.

The owner was Stampen, which bought Centertidningar AB (including Hallands Nyheter) in 2005. Starting from 27 February 2007 the paper is printed in Halmstad in tabloid format. The paper is part of Mediebolaget Västkusten, MBVK, and its sister newspaper is Hallandsposten.

== See also ==
- List of Swedish newspapers

== Literature ==
- Håkan Bergström (2005). Jorden runt och tvärs över gatan : en hundraårig historia i hundra kapitel : Hallands nyheter 100 år. Falkenberg: Hallands Nyheter.
