= Falkenburg =

Falkenburg or Falkinburg may refer to:

Places

- Falkenburg, German name for Złocieniec, a town in Middle Pomerania, north-western Poland
- Falkenburg (an der Göhl), German name for Valkenburg aan de Geul, a municipality in the Dutch province of Limburg
- Falkenburg Castle, a castle in Rhineland-Palatinate, Germany
- Falkenburg, Ontario, a railway village in central Ontario, Canada
- Joseph Falkinburg House, a historic home in Dennis Township, New Jersey, US

People

- Bob Falkenburg (1926–2022), American former tennis player and businessman of German descent
- Erik Falkenburg, Dutch footballer
- Jinx Falkenburg, Spanish-born model and actress
- Page Joseph Falkinburg Jr., birth name of American actor and retired professional wrestler Diamond Dallas Page
- Reindert Falkenburg, Dutch art historian

Other uses

- Goodbye Falkenburg, the debut full-length album by the band Race Horses

== See also ==
- Falkenberg (disambiguation)
