= Zulmir Bečević =

Swedish writer

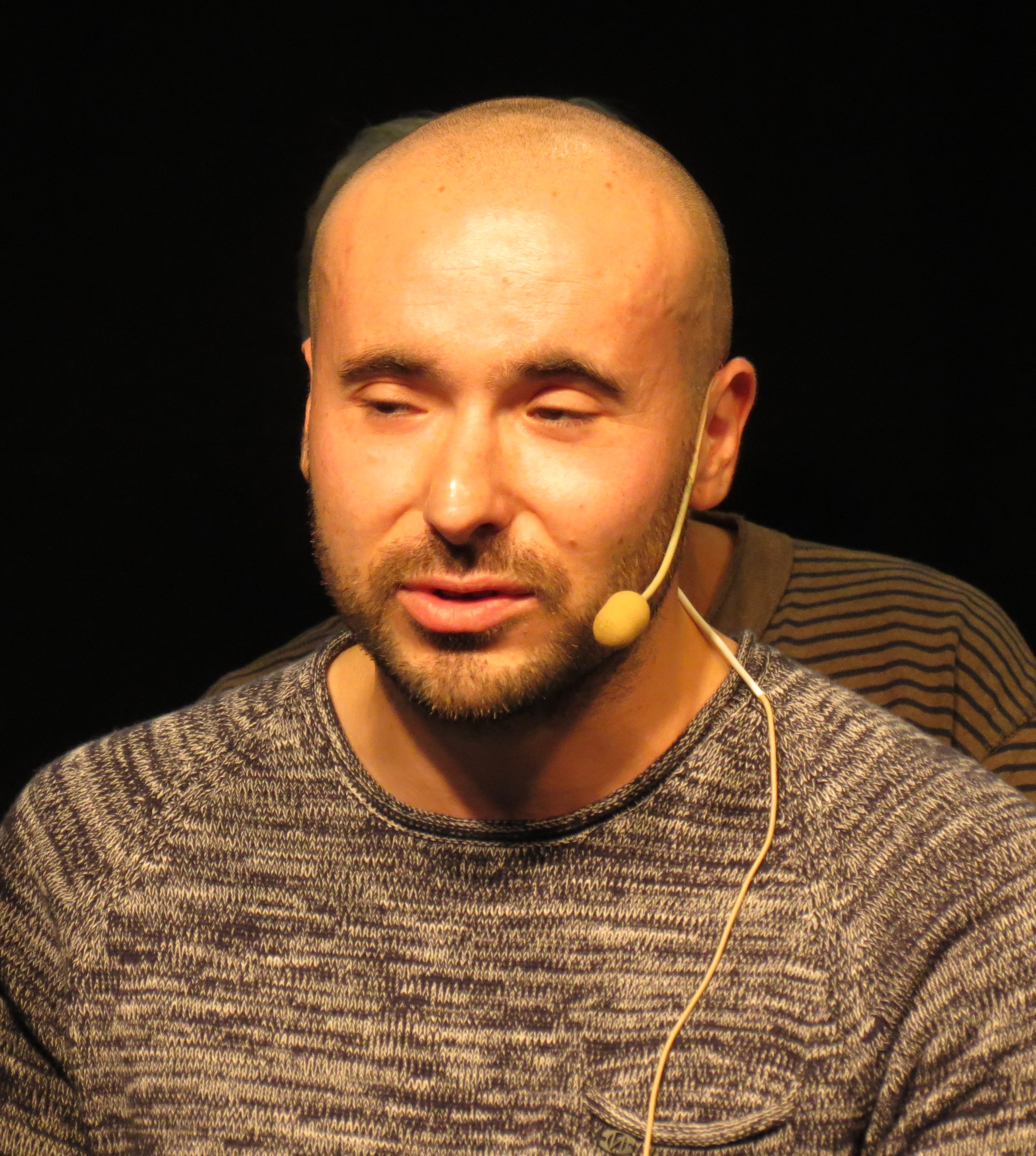
- Becevic in 2015
- Born: January 31, 1982 (age 44); Orašje, Yugoslavia
- Occupation: Novelist
- Website: www.becevic.se

Zulmir Bečević (born 31 January 1982) is a Swedish-Bosnian author and academic.

== Biography ==
In 1992 he and his family fled from the civil war in the Republic of Bosnia and Herzegovina to Sweden, an event that laid the foundation for his semi-biographical debut novel Resan som började med ett slut. The novel was published in 2006, and received positive reviews.

His second novel, Svenhammeds journaler, was published in 2009; it was nominated for the August Prize in the Children and Young Adults category. A stage version of the book was produced at Folkteatern in Gävleborg in 2011.

Bečević's third novel, Avblattefieringsprocessen, is a satire on the growing xenophobia in Swedish society. It was published in 2014.

When Bečević came to Sweden as a 10-year-old with his family, they moved to Falkenberg where Bečević grew up and went to school. He has a Master's degree in political science from Växjö University, and a PhD in child studies from Linköping University. He is a senior lecturer at the Department of Social Work at University of Gothenburg.
