= Skrea strand =

Beach in Falkenberg, Sweden

Coordinates: 56°52′59″N 12°30′16″E

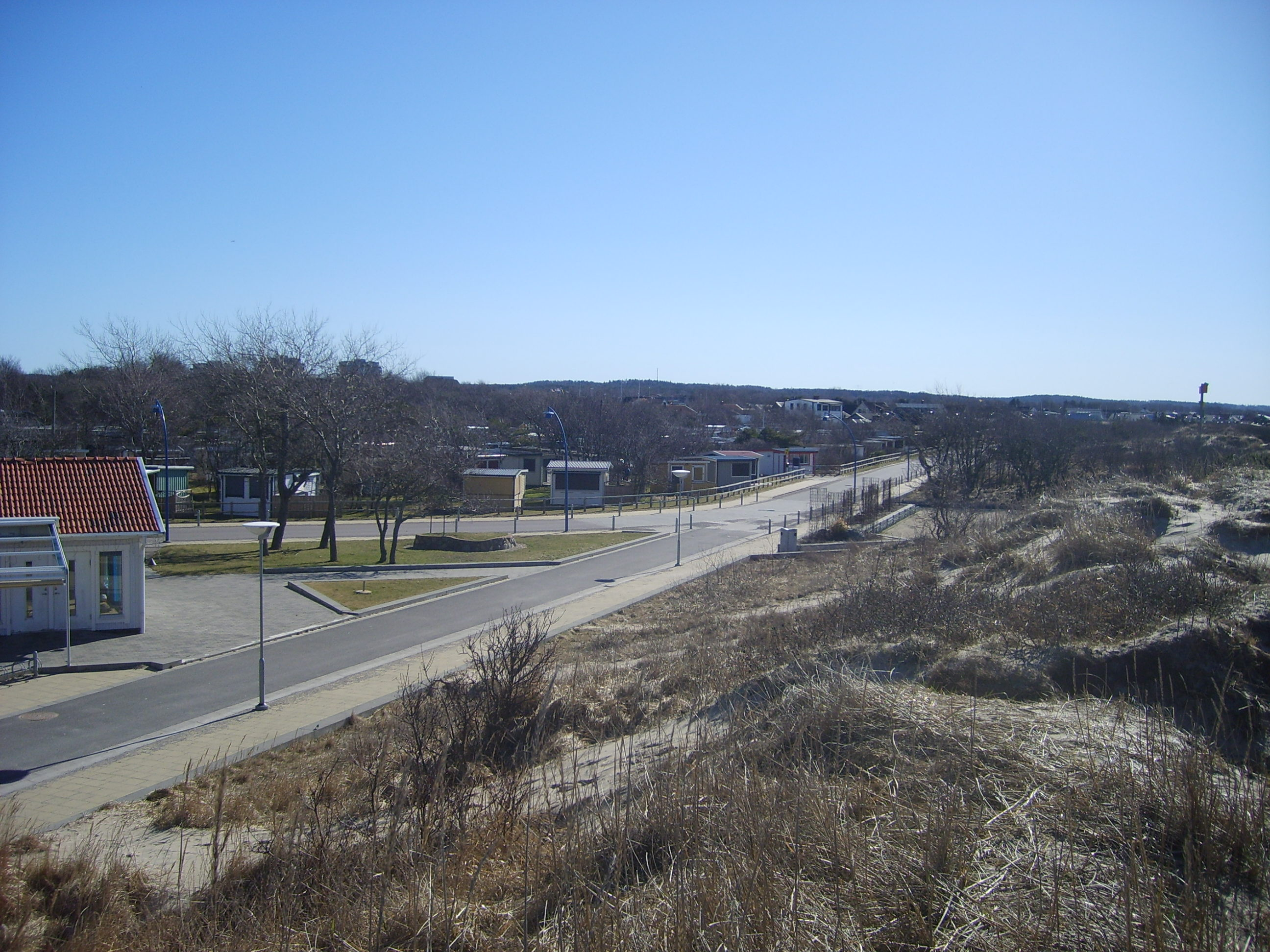
Dunes and summer homes in Skrea strand

Skrea strand is a beach in Falkenberg, Sweden. It is approximately two kilometres long, and has a 250 metre long pier and about 1,600 cabins. An indoor bath, Klitterbadet, is located close to the beach.

== History ==
The area was originally outlying land, belonging to Skrea. The number of bathers increased as it became easier to reach the beach due to road and rail connections. In 1914, the beach had tens of cabins, and by 1928 their number had increased to about 300. Tuberkulosföreningen (the Tuberculosis association) had a children's camp at the beach from 1917. From the 1930s, facilities such as a hotel and restaurant were built to handle the increasing number of bathers. Hotel Strandbaden's first building was ready in 1937 in the same place where the current hotel is located. Klitterbadet was built in 1969.

In the statistics from Statistics Sweden in 2005 stated that Skrea Beach had more than 200 inhabitants, but that the resort was still counted as small or not urban areas, as more than half of the houses are holiday homes. However, the data was revised in 2005 for several small varieties on October 2, 2012, due to improved data base.
