= Falkenberg (fort) =

Fort in Sweden

Coordinates: 56°55′N 12°26′E

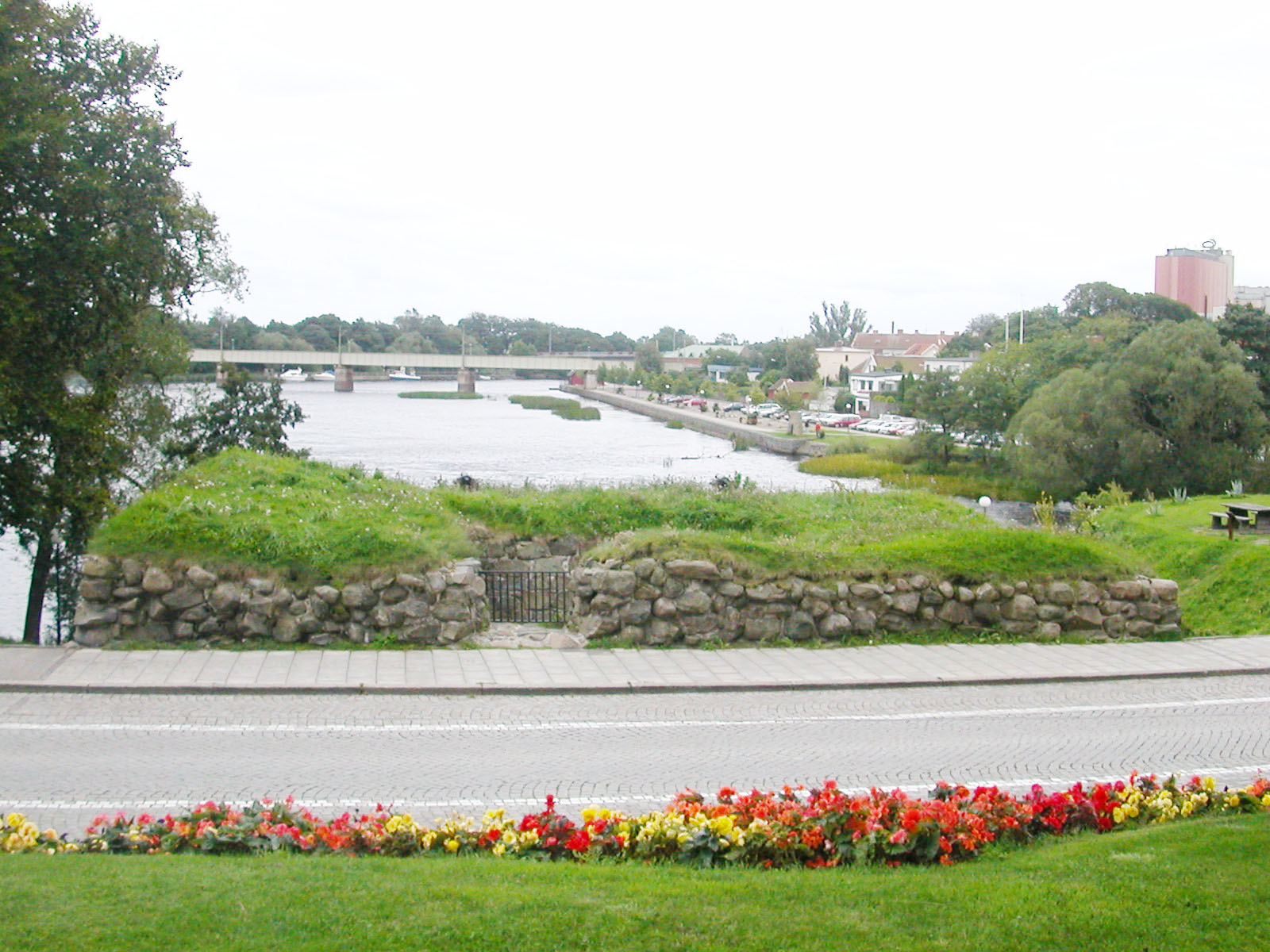
Only the lower parts of the tower remains.

Falkenberg (Falkenbergshus) was a fort located at Falkenberg in Halland County, Sweden. The fortification was placed on the south strand of the river Ätran, about 60 m (200 ft) from the southern abutment of Falkenberg Bridge. It would later give name to the town of Falkenberg which was previously known as Ätraby.

== History ==
Falkenberg was first mentioned in 1298. In the early part of the 13th century the province of Halland was part of Denmark. The Danish kings had built a fortification on the east shore of the Ätran river in the community of Falkenberg. The fort was the site for several Nordic treaties during the fourteenth century. In 1350s, King Magnus Eriksson made Bengt Algotsson Duke of Halland, and Falkenberg was also given to him. The fortification was demolished by Erik Magnusson in 1356 during his campaign against Bengt Algotsson.

The fort was rebuilt soon thereafter. The army of Swedish rebel leader Engelbrekt Engelbrektsson (1390s – 1436) besieged the town in 1434, under the leadership of Herman Berman. The action took place during the Engelbrekt rebellion against King Eric of Pomerania. The defenders managed the first attack successfully however they realized that they would not be able to continue to hold the fort. Therefore, they choose to set the fort on fire and escape by water. The fort was again destroyed and never rebuilt.

Excavations took place in 1885, as a railway was run through the area. The fort consisted of a tower. It had an inner area of 5.5 by 5.5 m (18 by 18 ft), while the outer area was 15.5 by 15.5 m (50 by 50 ft) at the base. The walls were thickest at the base and became thinner towards the top. Above the lower, partially intact parts were brick walls. The group which performed the excavations found remains of brick strewn over the excavated area. The group also found some artifacts such as weapons, tools and household goods as well as two finger rings and a silver coin.

== Listed administrators ==
- 1344 - Trotte Petersson
- 1356 - Bengt Algotsson
- 1384 - Eskil Brahe
- 1433-1434 - Åke Axelsson (Tott)

== See also ==
- History of Falkenberg

== Other Sources ==
- Carl Estmar (1998). Borgen Falkenberg i källskrifterna. (Falkenbergs museum).
- Mats Dahlbom; Peter Skoglund (2011) Falkenberg i dansk medeltid (Salmon River) ISBN 9789163389597
