= Laholms tidning =

Swedish newspaper

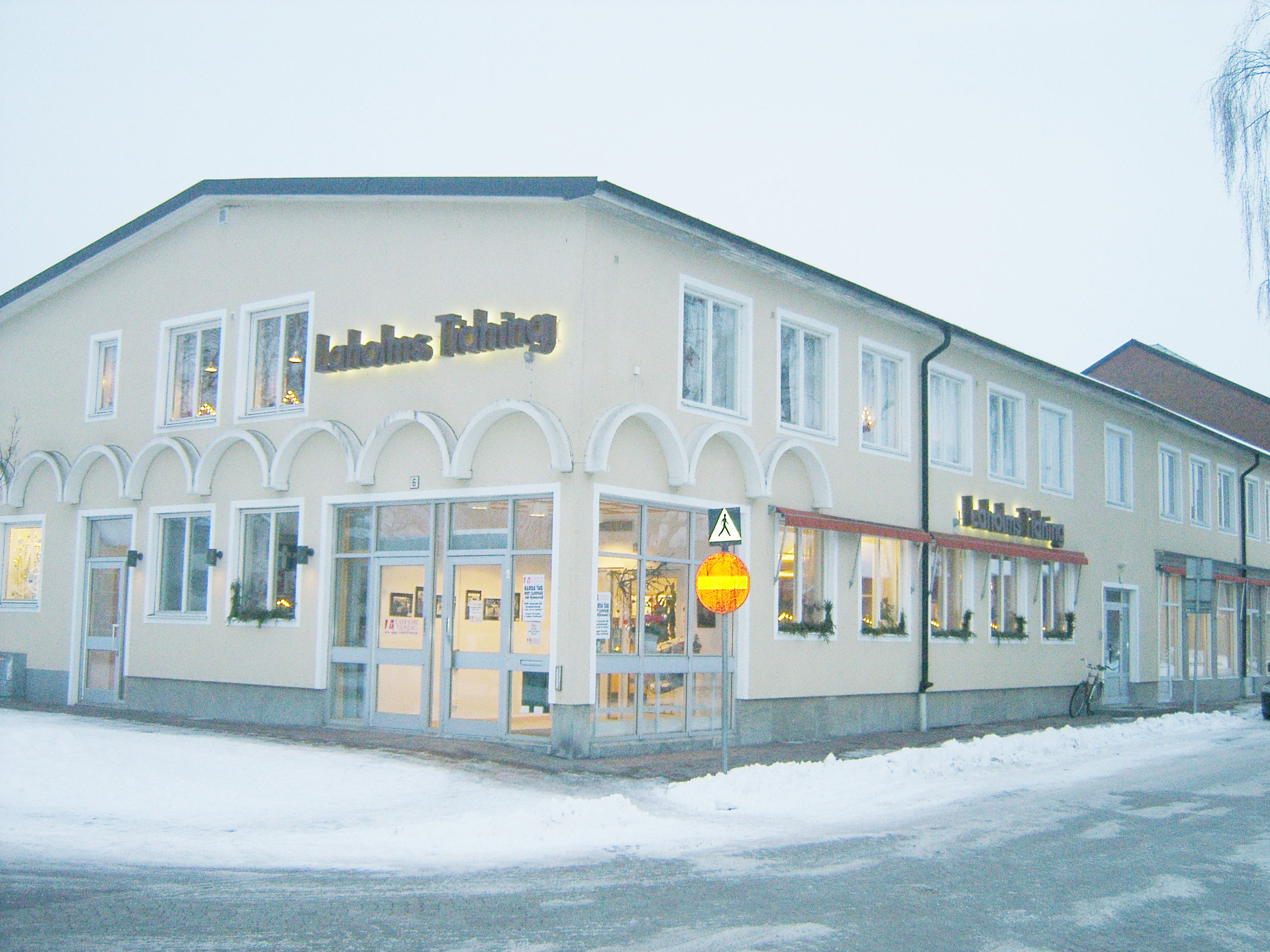
The office buildings of Laholms Tidnings

Laholms tidning is a Swedish newspaper that was published six days a week from Laholm, Sweden. In 2018 it filed for bankruptcy. In 2019 Bonnier News bought the remnants. It is, as of 2021, an online section of Helsingborgs Dagblad as well as a free weekly paper newspaper

== History and profile ==
Laholms tidning was first published on 5 December 1931, originally printed every second day. The paper was bought by the farmers movement in 1932. It has had extensive collaborations with Hallands Nyheter, due shared background in the farmers movement.
