= Walter Dickson (author) =

Swedish author

- Born: 1916
- Died: 23 March 1990 (aged 73–74)

Walter Dickson (22 February, 1916 – 23 March, 1990) was a Swedish author.

== Biography ==
Dickson was born in New Haven in the United States, where his father worked as a carpenter. The family returned to Sweden in 1921 and settled in Vinberg near Falkenberg, where he was raised by his grandparents. Dickson graduated in Halmstad in 1936 and received his bachelor's degree in philosophy from the University of Gothenburg, but he also studied at universities in Uppsala and Stockholm. From 1943 he was a literature reviewer in the daily newspaper Ny Tid and also contributed to several Finnish and Swedish literary magazines and the trade union press.

Dickson made his debut as author with Perspektiv från Stigberget (1942) and Det gamla huset (1943), both collections of short stories depicting the working-class district of Masthugget in Gothenburg. In his largest work, he wrote a series of novels about his own family and its emigrant fates: Skallgång (1946), Vid havets rand (1948), Storbasens saga (1951), Carmania (1952), Amerika (1954), Oceanisk hemfärd (1955) and Solagömma (1957). Dickson also wrote cultural-historical essays and several books about the landscape of Halland. He was a socialist and in describing older times he is often critical of social ills. Despite this, in the 1970s he wrote for the Centre Party Youth's magazine Ung Center.

His narrative style is considered personal and inventive.

== Bibliography ==
- Perspektiv från stigberget 1942
- Det gamla huset 1943
- Störst är kärleken 1945
- Skallgång 1946
- Hammare och sälgpipa 1947
- Vid havets rand 1948
- Det eldröda landskapet 1948
- Masker och en klippa 1949
- Händerna 1950
- Storbasens saga 1951
- Carmania (1952)
- Hjärtfäste och hungertorn 1953
- Mitt Halland 1953
- Det vidgade jaget 1953
- Amerika 1954
- Oceanisk hemfärd 1955
- En livslivets diktare 1956
- Marie! Madrid! 1956
- Solgömma 1957
- Helhet i snitt och vinklar 1957
- Ur min anteckningsbok 1958
- Batteristen 1959
- Livsens dag 1959
- Dödsens liv 1960
- På upptäcktsfärd i Ätradalen 1961
- Halländsk horisont 1962
- Månresa 1962
- Solaglaning (1964)
- Jävlafora 1966
- Lasse i Gatan och andra Hallandssägner 1969
- Vart har folket tagit vägen? 1971
- Fabler och småstycken från öst och väst 1971
- "Broadway Blend": Emigrantberättelser (1973)
- Vägakantspredikan 1975
- Ringen i djupet 1977
- Sacco och Vanzetti 1977
- Perspektiv på Kina 1980
- Vad är boxning? 1982
- Folkafora 1983

== Awards ==
- Arbetarnas bildningsförbund's literary prize 1957

== Bibliography ==
- Hedén, Stig J., ed. (1995). Falkenberg - staden som hembygd. ISBN 91-630-3848-X.
