= Boken till Dig =

1983 book by Jan Widströmer

Boken till dig
- "Boken till dig" original cover
- Author: Jan Widströmer
- Illustrator: Jan Widströmer
- Cover artist: Jan Widströmer
- Language: Swedish
- Genre: Poetry
- Publisher: Ab Ruter Press Laholm
- Publication date: 1983
- Publication place: Sweden
- Pages: 54
- OCLC: N/A

Boken till Dig is a book of poetry published in 1983 by the Swedish artist Jan Widströmer. The book combines Widströmer's poems with his artwork.

Widströmer emphasizes that "Boken till dig" is more than an illustrated collection of poems - it is more of a "poetical whole". The drawings and the poems go hand-in-hand and together they form a continuity and a combined experience which goes further than the individual piece of artwork.

The drawings as well as the poems are influenced by nature, life, death and love. The poems could be characterized as "haikuish" - that is short and powerful, often meditative, usually with multiple possible interpretations. It is up to the reader/beholder to make his own interpretation of the poems and the artwork.

My art is spiritual. My art is hymns of music in color. My art is poetry without words.

— Jan Widströmer
