= Klitterbadet =

Bath house in Falkenberg, Sweden

Coordinates: 56.88902°N 12.49485°E

Klitterbadet is a bath house in Falkenberg, Sweden. It started as an outdoor bath in 1969, but was rebuilt as an indoor bath in 1983. It is the only 50 meter salt water pool with eight lines in Sweden.
