= Jojje Jönsson =

Swedish actor and playwright

(From left to right) Claes Malmberg, Jojje Jönsson, Mikael Riesebeck, and Jessica Heribertsson wish everyone a Happy New Year during a visit to the Bingolotto studio on May 12, 2024.

Jöns-Ove "Jojje" Jönsson is a Swedish actor and playwright.

Jojje won a Golden Mask for best male supporting actor in a play 2000 and 2001. He is most widely known for his roles in the farces of Stefan & Krister, from the 1990s and onwards. He had however had some earlier success playing Ivan Boring in the 1980s.

== Acting roles ==
- 2006 - Brännvin och fågelholkar – Söderkåkar reser västerut!
- 2005 - Två ägg i högklackat
- 2004 - Två bröder emellan
- 2003 - Barnaskrik och jäkelskap
- 2002 - Bröllop och jäkelskap
- 2001 - Snålvatten och jäkelskap
- 2000 - Rena rama rolf
- 1999 - Bröstsim & gubbsjuka
- 1998 - Där fick du!
- 1998 - Full frys
- 1997 - Hemvärn & påssjuka
- 1996 - Hemlighuset
- 1993 - Full fräs med Stefan & Krister

== Playwright ==
- 1993 - Full fräs med Stefan & Krister
