= Högvadsån =

Coordinates: 57°02′N 12°39′E

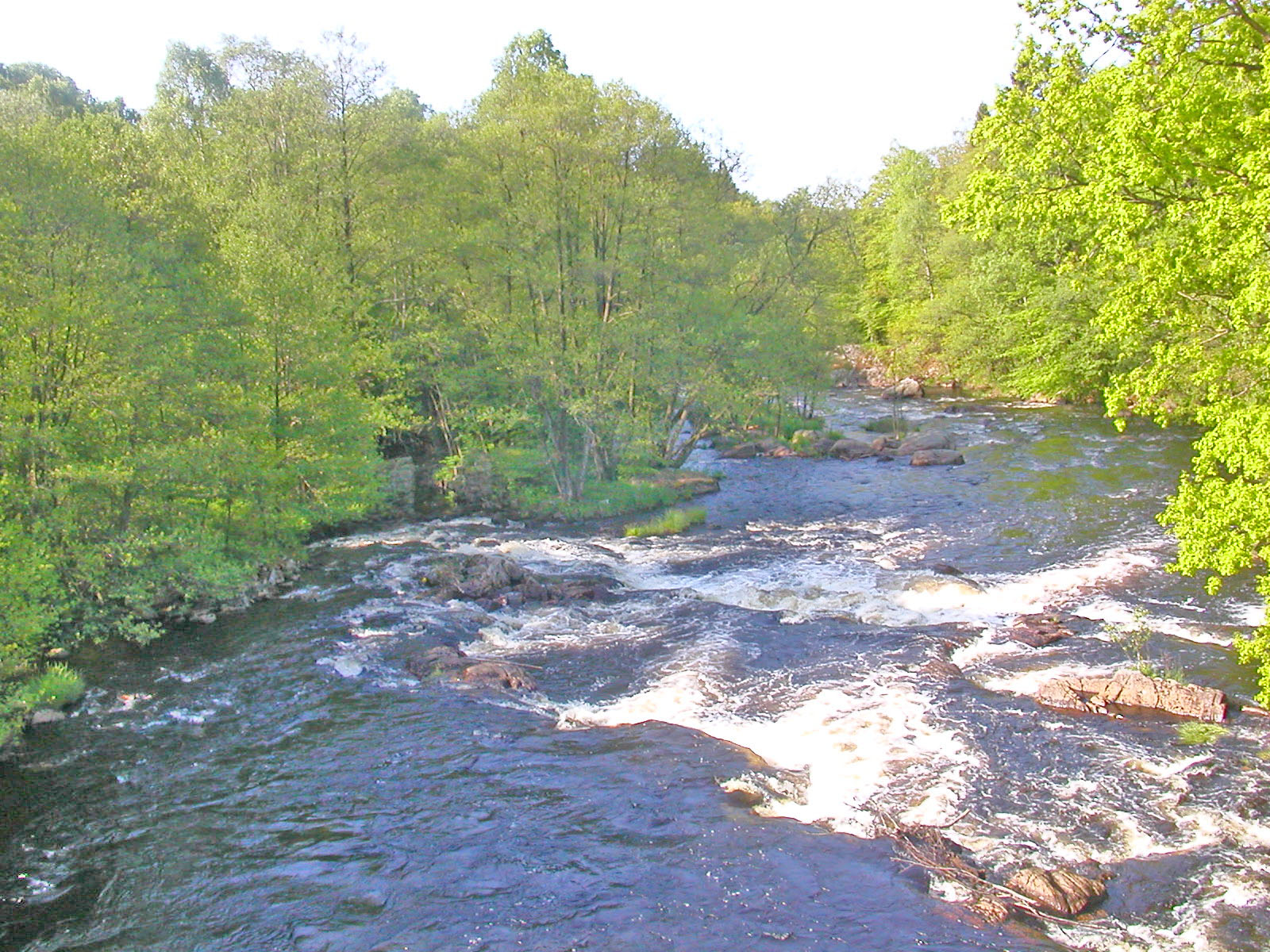
Högvadsån

Högvadsån is the largest tributary of river Ätran, Sweden. It is well known for the fishing of salmon and is chalked in order to counteract acid rain. It is protected by Natura 2000.
