= Hallandsposten =

Local newspaper in Halland, Sweden

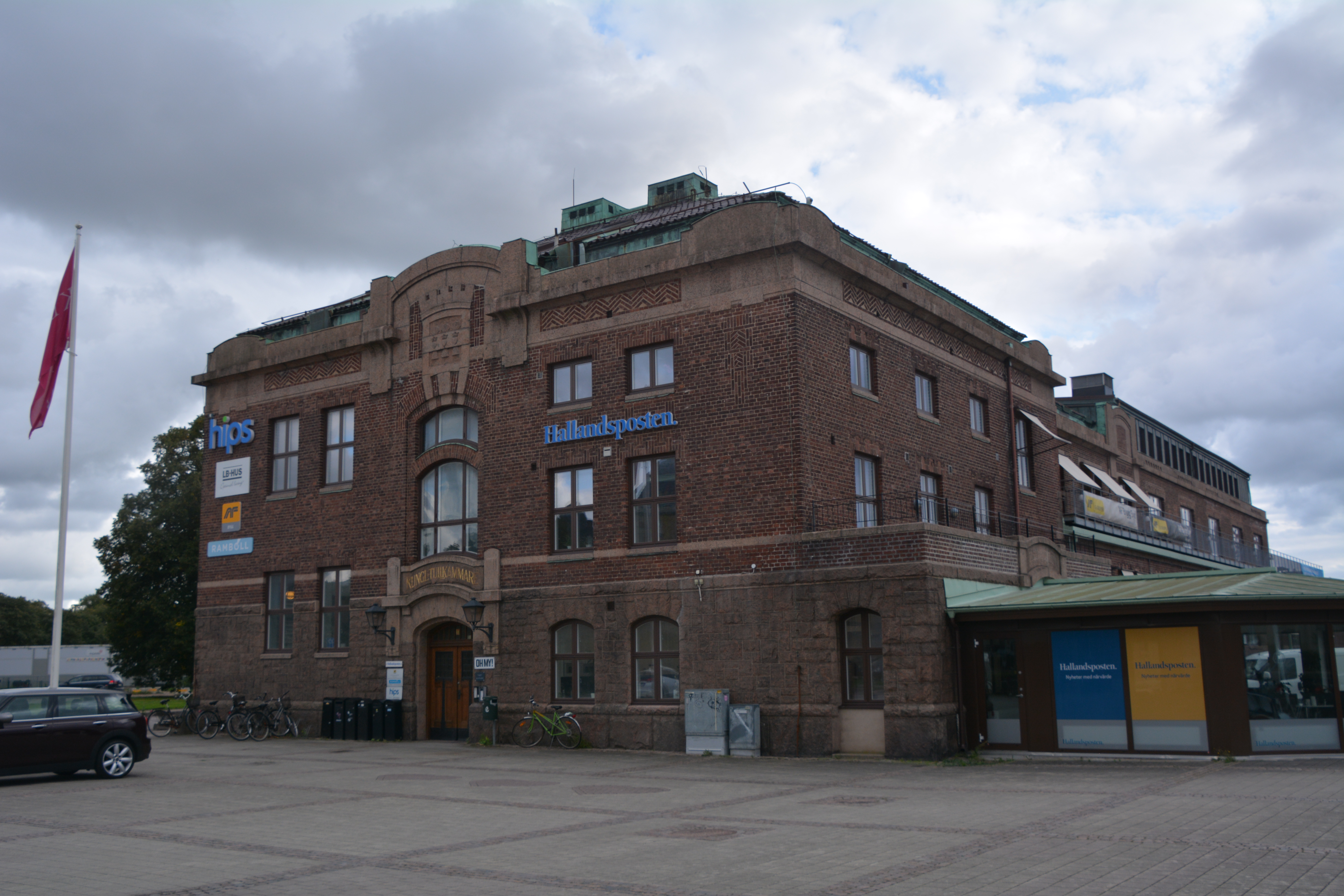
- Headquarters in Halmstad
- Type: Daily newspaper
- Format: Tabloid
- Owner(s): Mediebolaget Västkusten, MBVK
- Editor-in-chief: Herman Nikolic
- Founded: 1850; 175 years ago
- Political alignment: Independent liberal
- Language: Swedish
- Headquarters: Halmstad, Sweden
- Circulation: 29,900 (2013)
- Sister newspapers: Hallands Nyheter
- ISSN: 1103-9361
- Website: Hallandsposten

Hallandsposten is a Swedish local morning newspaper printed in Halmstad, Sweden. It is the major newspaper of Halmstad, Hylte and Laholm municipalities

== History and profile ==
Hallandsposten was established in 1850. The first issue appeared on 30 July 1850. The paper became daily in 1900, before that it was printed two times a week. One of the editors of the paper was Eric Hägge who served in the post in the early 1940s.

Hallandsposten is part of the Mediebolaget Västkusten, MBVK, which also owns Hallands Nyheter. Hallandsposten was published in broadsheet format until 2007 when it switched to tabloid format. The paper has an independent liberal leaning.

Hallandsposten was the first newspaper in Sweden to make old prints available to the public. The newspaper has digitalised all print editions since 1931. They are scanned, OCR-processed and available to the public. Older prints were excluded because original quality was too low to OCR-process.

== Circulation ==
The circulation of Hallandsposten was 32,200 copies in 1996. It was 30,900 copies in 2010. Next year the paper reached 120,000 readers. The paper had a circulation of 29,100 copies in 2012 and 29,000 copies in 2013.
