= Falkenbergs gymnasieskola =

School in Falkenberg, Sweden

Coordinates: 56°54′25.95″N 12°29′27.95″E

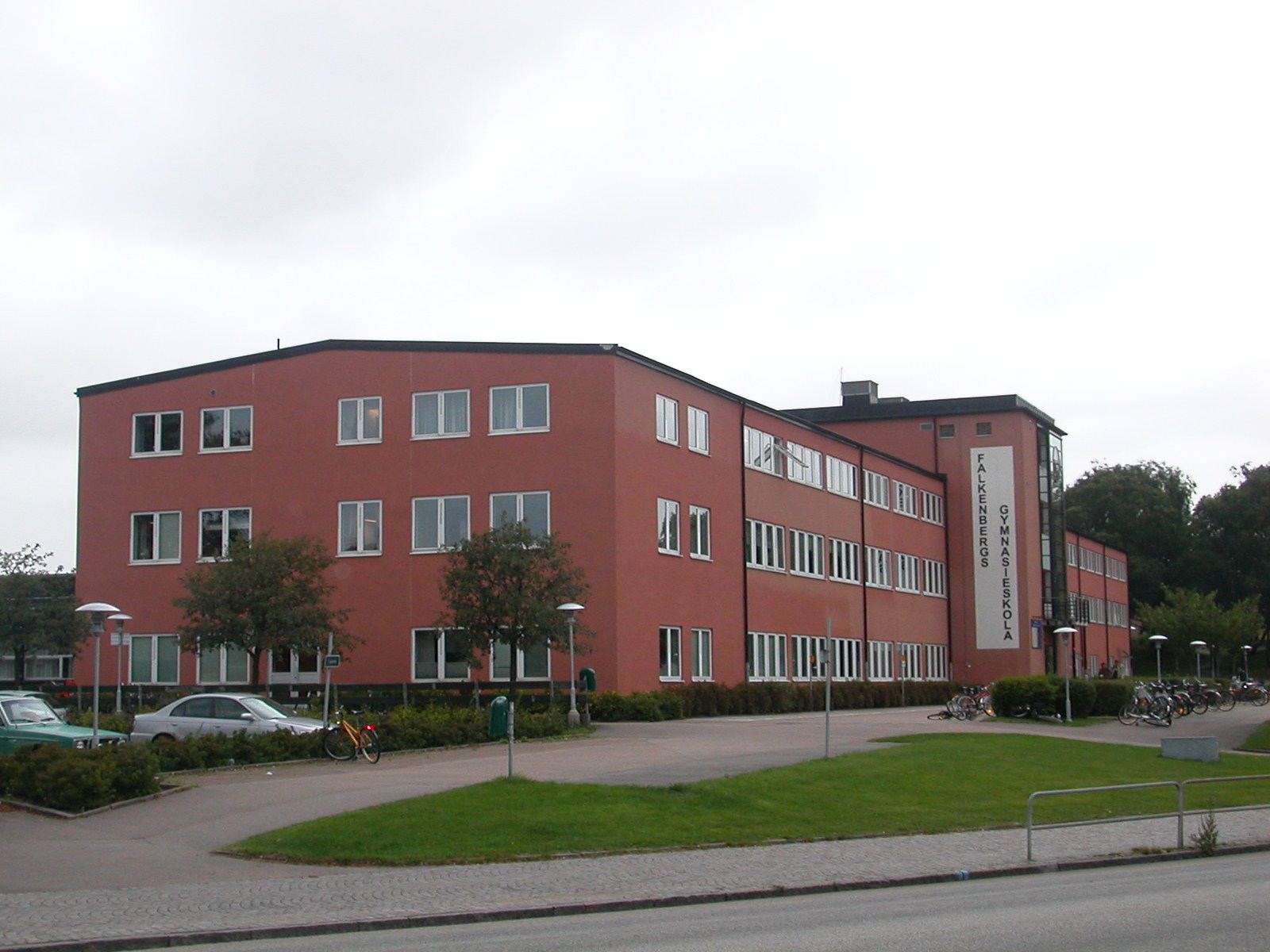
Part of main building, including the main entrance

Falkenbergs gymnasieskola is a gymnasium (secondary school) in Falkenberg, Sweden.

It has about 2,000 students, including people in adult education (Komvux). The students choose between 16 different concentrations. The gymnasium share building the town library.

The school is located in an old tannery, and was inaugurated in 1971. Major works on the school took place in the 1990s.

== Sources ==
- Från lantbruk till valskvarn - Den industriella utvecklingen i Falkenberg 1880-1915, Rosengren, Lage. 1994. (in Swedish)
