= Falkenbergs Tidning =

Newspaper published in Sweden (1875–1954)

Falkenbergs Tidning (lit. "Falkenberg's Newspaper") was a conservative newspaper, published in Falkenberg between 1875 and 1954. It was also an advertising brochure/free newspaper, published between 1993 and 2005. It was the first newspaper published in Falkenberg, and remained the largest newspaper in town until the 1930s. Its position was however overtaken by Hallands Nyheter.

Axel F. Möller founded the paper, which originally had a circulation of 400. August Salomonsson took over as editor in 1876. Later, Martin Lindegren would take over it, and the paper would remain in the ownership of his family until 1945.

The paper became increasingly conservative. It was, due to the decreasing circulation, from 1954 included in Hallands Dagblad, which in turn was closed down in 1959.

The modern paper went bankrupt in 2005. The publishing rights are owned by Hallands Nyheter.

== Sources ==
- Falkenberg, staden som hembygd - bidrag till Falkenbergs historia, Falkenbergs Kultur och Hembygdsförening. 1995. ISBN 91-630-3848-X (in Swedish)
