= Hallandia antiqua et hodierna =

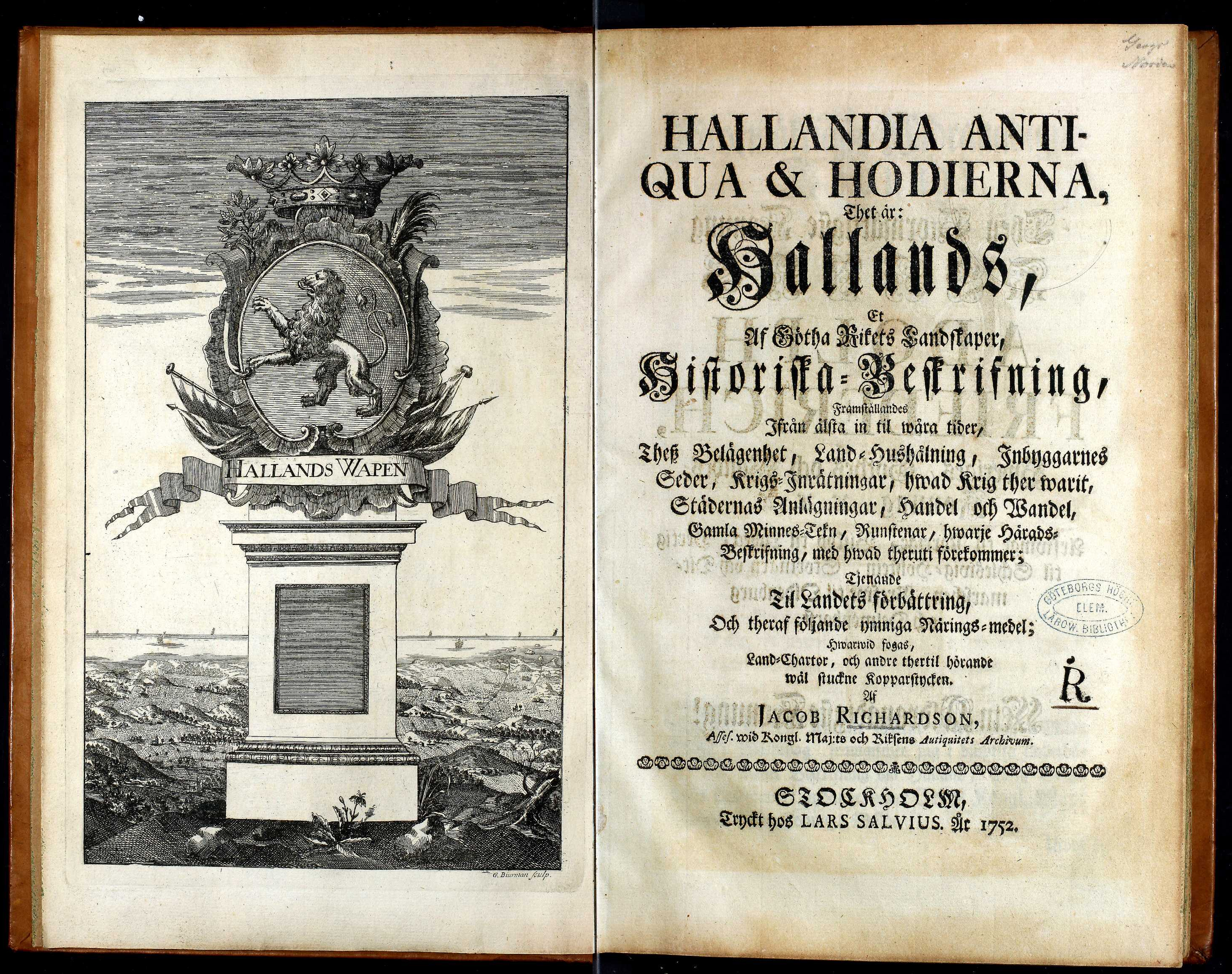

Hallandia antiqua et hodierna is a Swedish language book on the history of Halland. It was written by Jacob Richardson and was published in two parts in 1752 and 1753; a planned third part was never published. The book is strongly influenced by Suecia antiqua et hodierna and was based on two journeys, undertaken fourteen years apart.

The book mainly describes graves and remains. It does, however, also include an overview of the economy of the towns in Halland, as well as maps of towns, roads, administrative boundaries and so on. It was Richardson's opinion that Halland had gone through a golden era, in which it was more prosperous and populous. The book therefore tries to prove the existence of such a golden era, with abundant natural resources and good governance. The book lacks a conclusive overview of the political history of Halland. This is likely because of the long Danish history of the province. The book is regarded as unreliable, except for the description of the 18th-century economy.
