= Östra Frölunda =

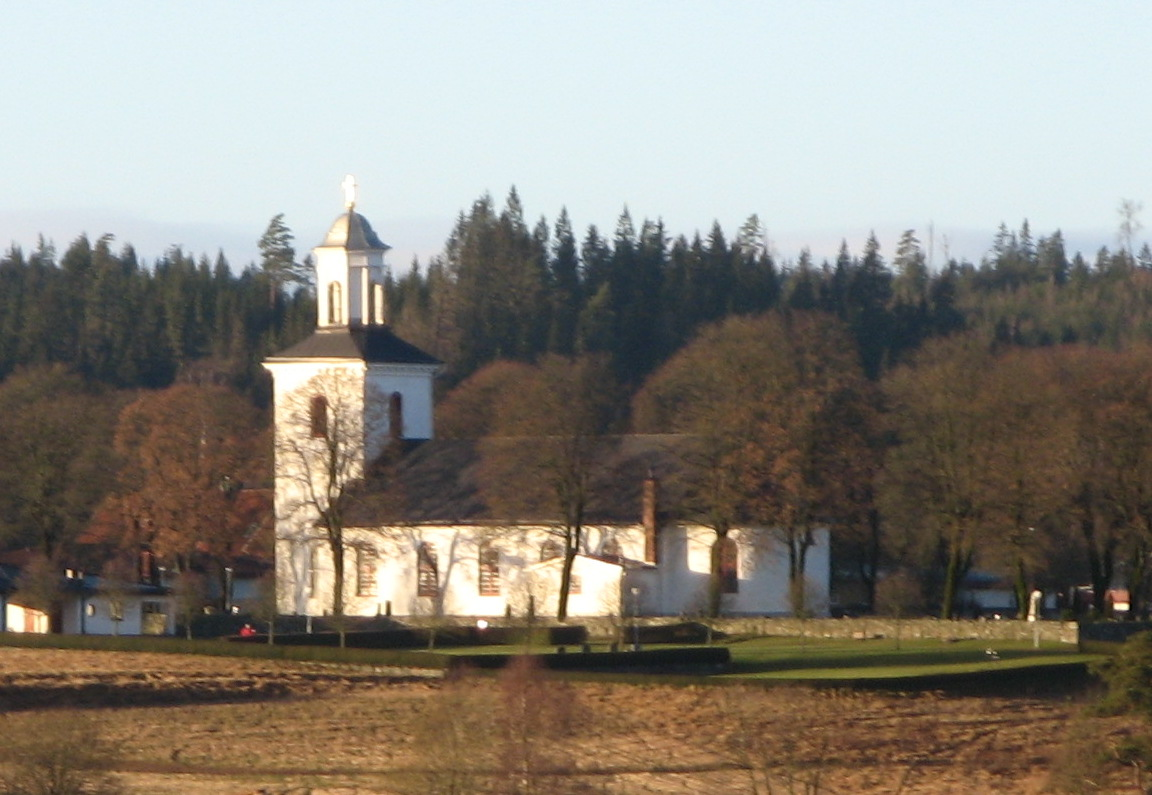
- Östra Frölunda Church in December 2007

- Location within Västra Götaland Location within Sweden
- Coordinates: 57°20′N 13°01′E
- Country: Sweden
- Province: Västergötland
- County: Västra Götaland County
- Municipality: Svenljunga Municipality

Area
  - Total: 0.49 km^{2} (0.19 sq mi)

Population (31 December 2010)
  - Total: 309
  - Density: 630/km^{2} (1,600/sq mi)
- Time zone: UTC+1 (CET)
  - Summer (DST): UTC+2 (CEST)

Östra Frölunda is a locality situated in Svenljunga Municipality, Västra Götaland County, Sweden with 309 inhabitants in 2010.
