= Saint Lawrence Church, Falkenberg =

Coordinates: 56°54′04″N 12°29′39″E

Saint Lawrence Church
- Sankt Laurentii kyrka
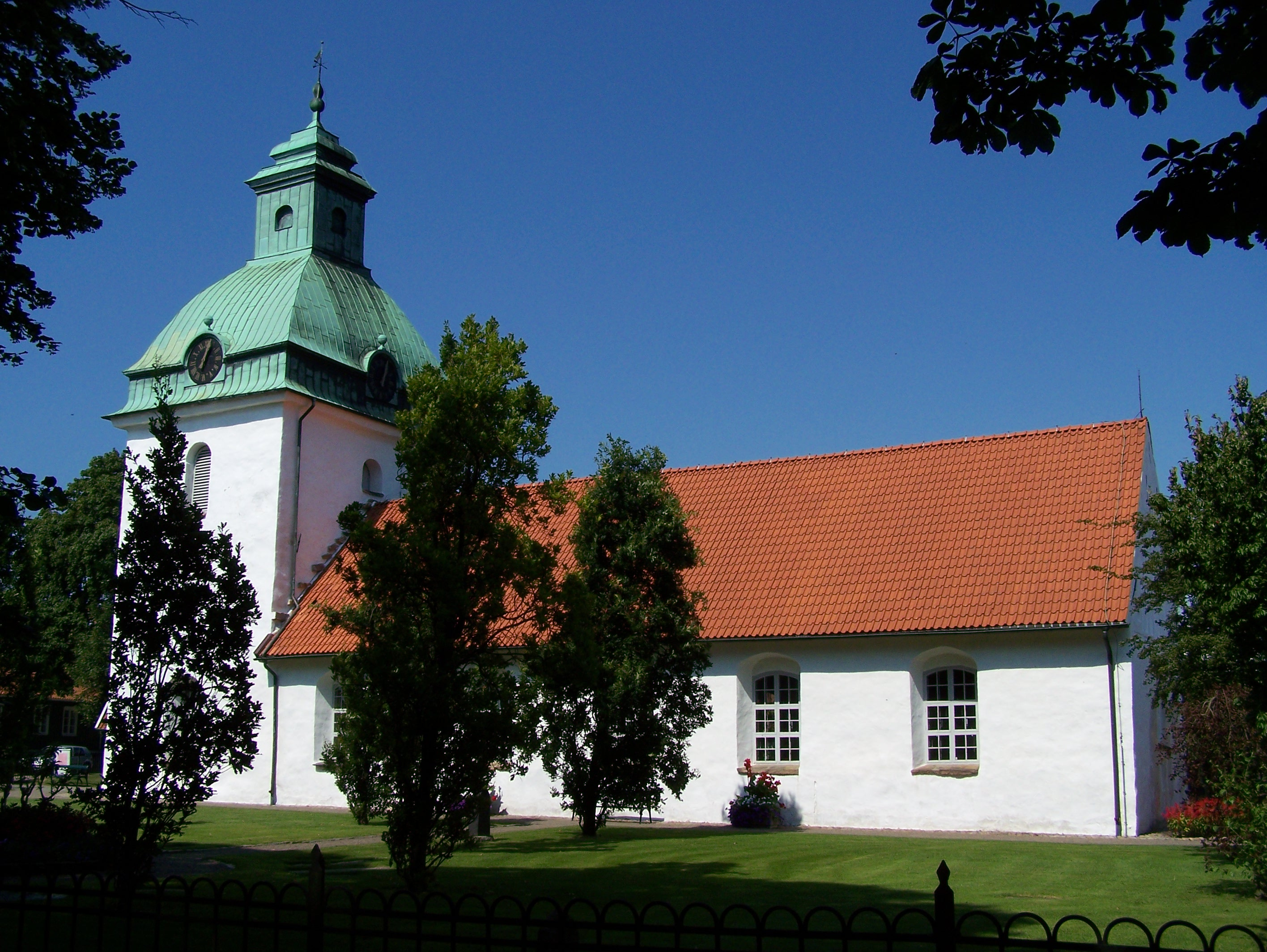
- The church as seen from the Laurentii park in old town Falkenberg
- Saint Lawrence Church
- Location: Falkenberg
- Country: Sweden
- Denomination: Church of Sweden

History
- Consecrated: circa 1300

Administration
- Diocese: Gothenburg
- Parish: Falkenberg Parish

The Saint Lawrence Church (Sankt Laurentii kyrka) is located at Falkenberg in Halland County, Sweden. The medieval era church is situated across from Laurentii Park in the centre of old town Falkenberg.

== History ==
The church was probably built around 1300. The tower was built in the 18th century. The church was burnt during the Northern Seven Years' War (1563–1570). The parishioners were in 1586 allowed to use the Crown's tolls and excise tax to rebuild the church. Large scale refurbishment took place in 1668 and in the mid-17th century.

It was the town's parish church until 1892, when it was replaced with Falkenberg Church (Falkenberg Kyrka). Discussions took place on its use after it had been replaced with the new church in 1892. It was suggested to be demolished. However, instead it came to be used as a gymnastics hall, as well as for hosting concerts and lectures.

Renovation in 1903 allowed the former church to once again be put into religious use. Between 1926-1928, it was restored under the direction of architect, Hakon Ahlberg.

== Gallery ==
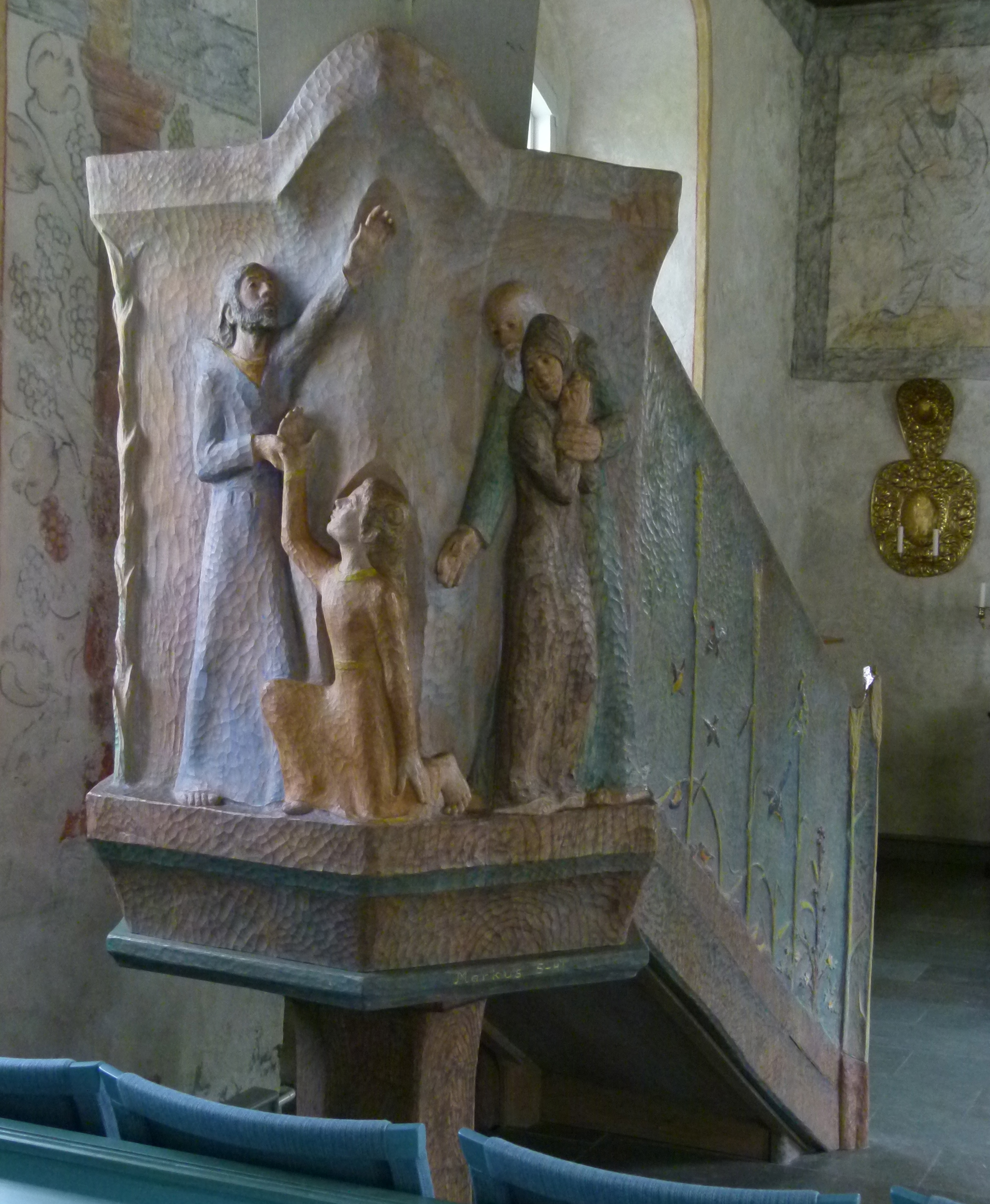
Puloit

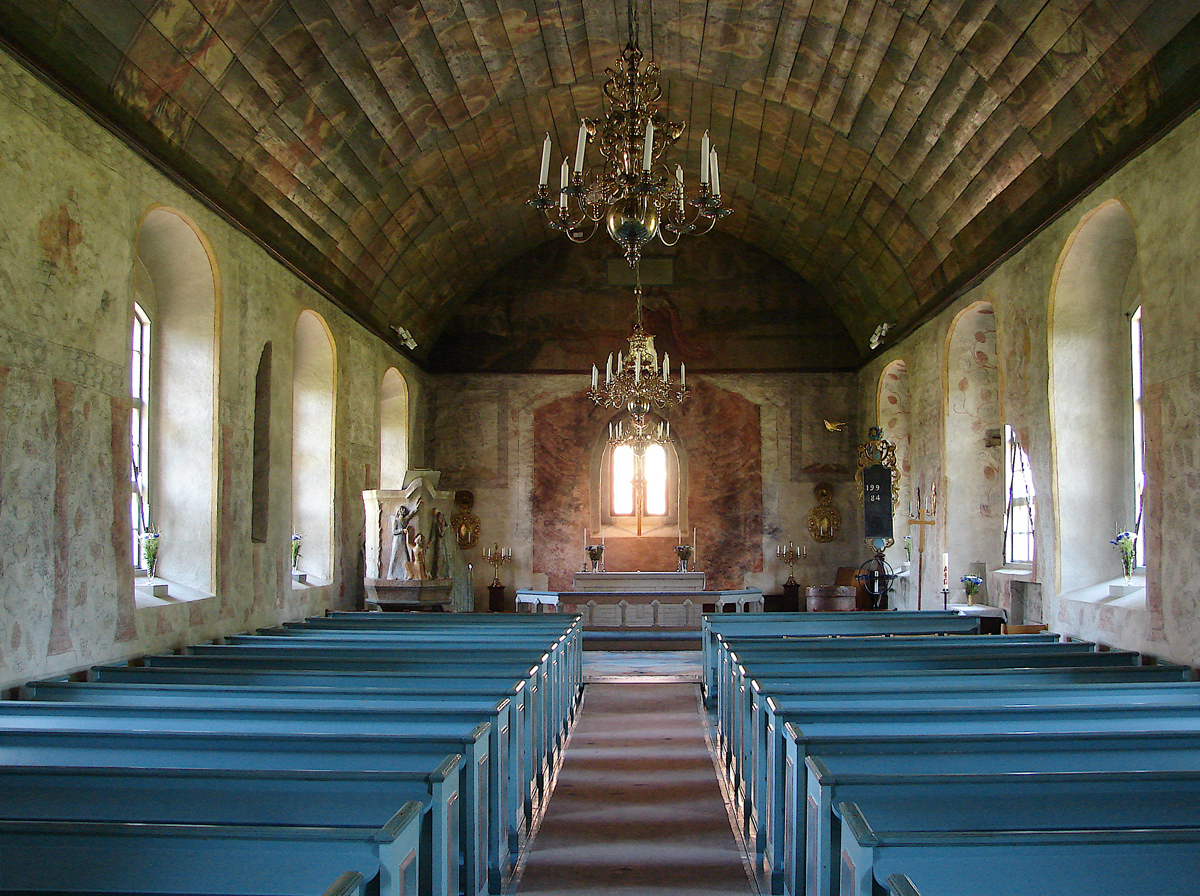
Interior Nave

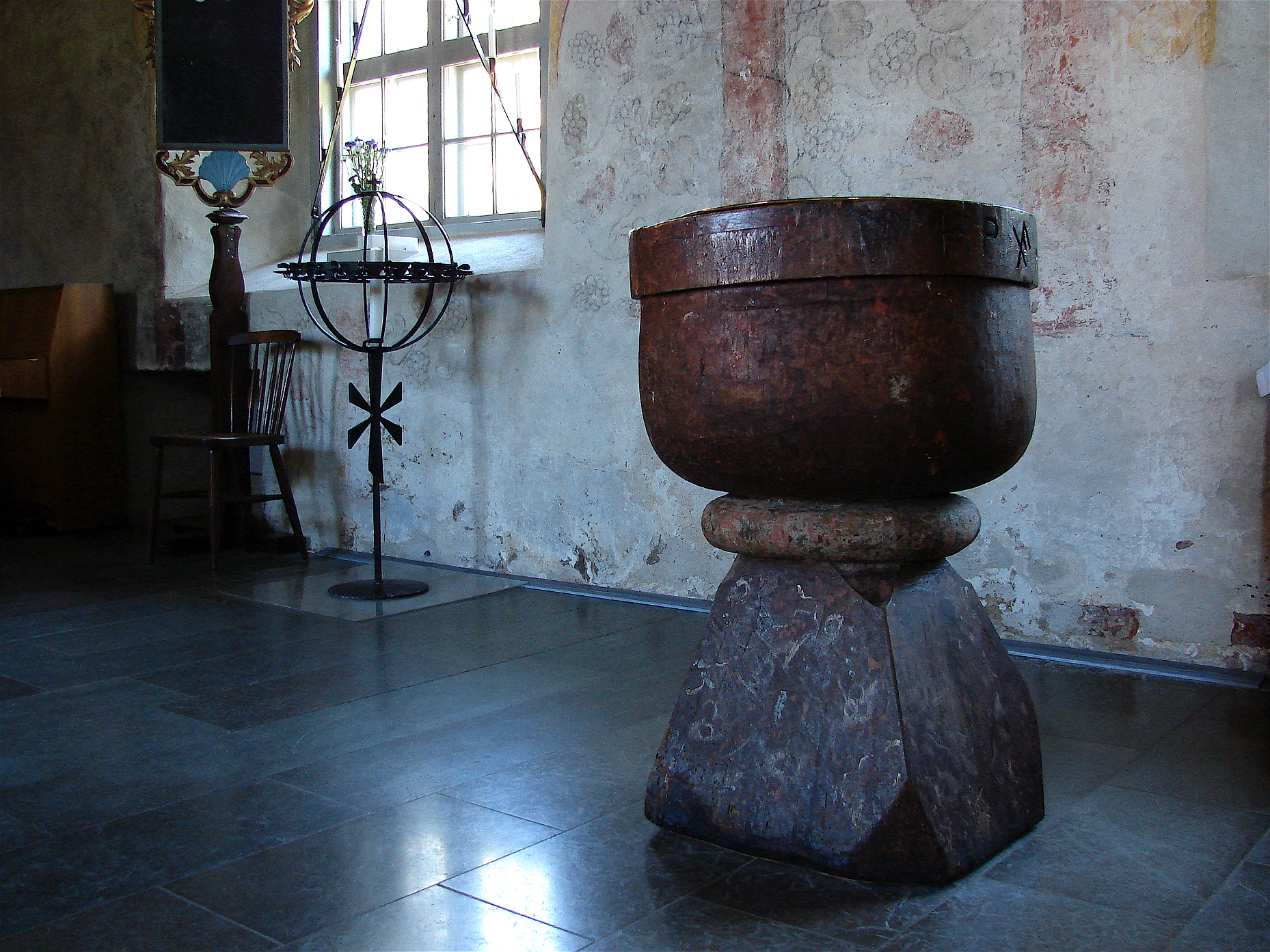
Baptismal Font

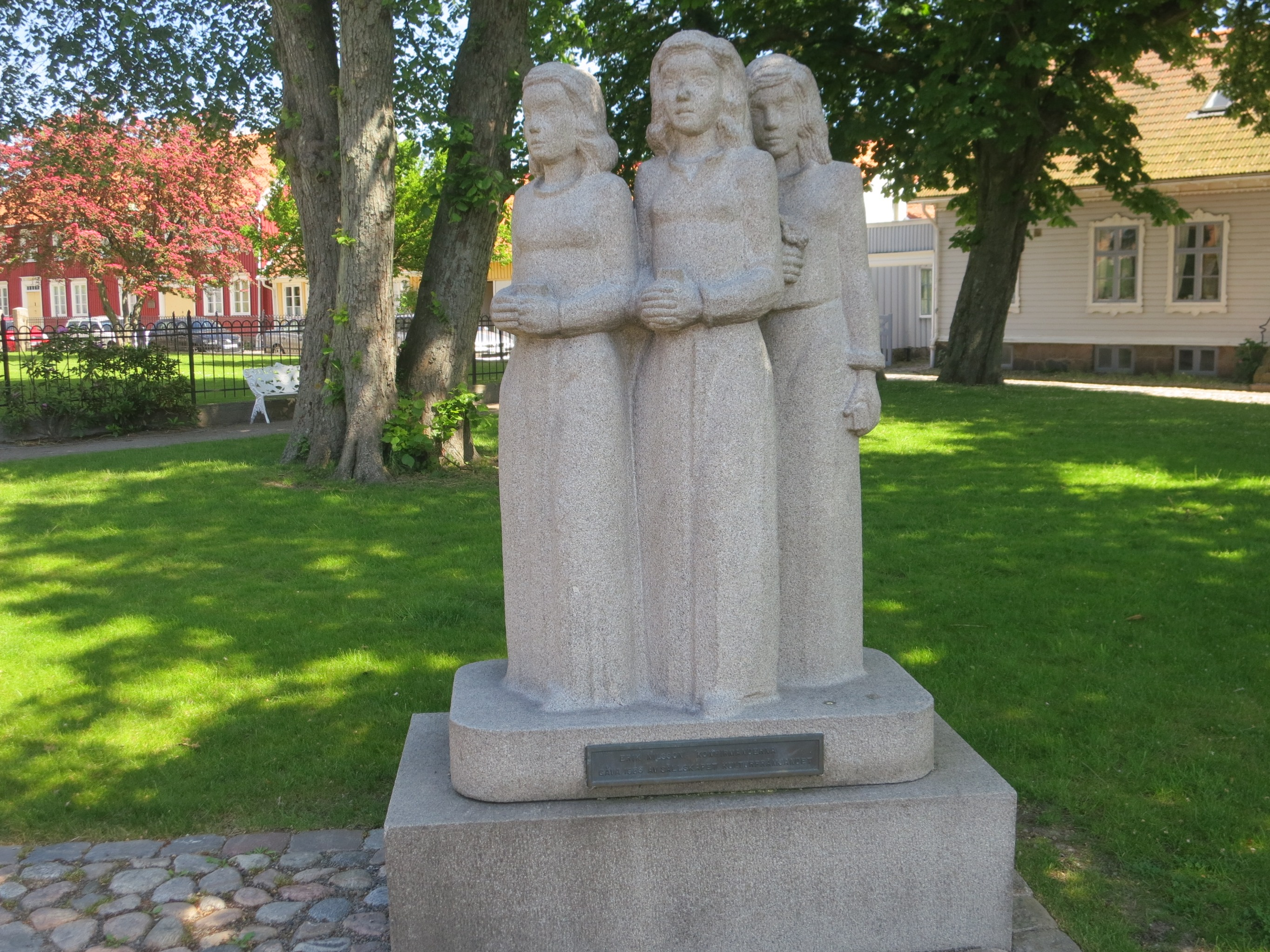
Konfirmanderna by Erik Nilsson (1956)

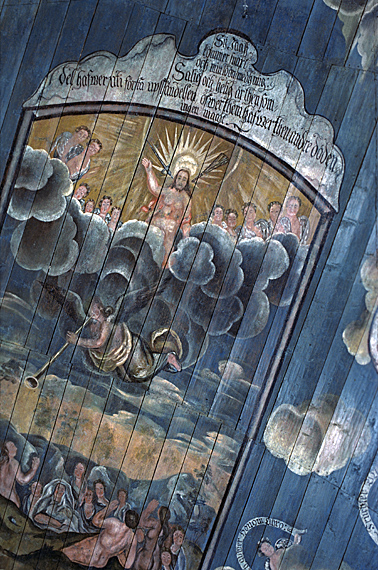
Interior painting
