= Falkenberg Town Hall =

Building in Falkenberg, Sweden

Coordinates: 56°54′15.58″N 12°29′29.41″E

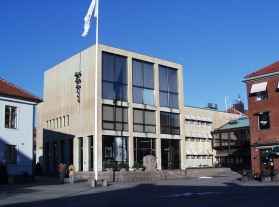
The Falkenberg Town Hall

Falkenberg Town Hall is a listed modern building, built 1958-1959 and inaugurated 16 August 1960. Lennart Tham was chosen as architect after no less than three competitions, the last one in 1949. The building process was delayed due to the need to build a new fire station, as the town hall would be located where the old fire station had been situated. The building was to be Tham's last work and has been listed since 2006.

The original building consisted of three sections (of which one is "the cube", the glassed section figuring prominently in the photo). It was extended with a new section in 1986.
