= Falkenberg =

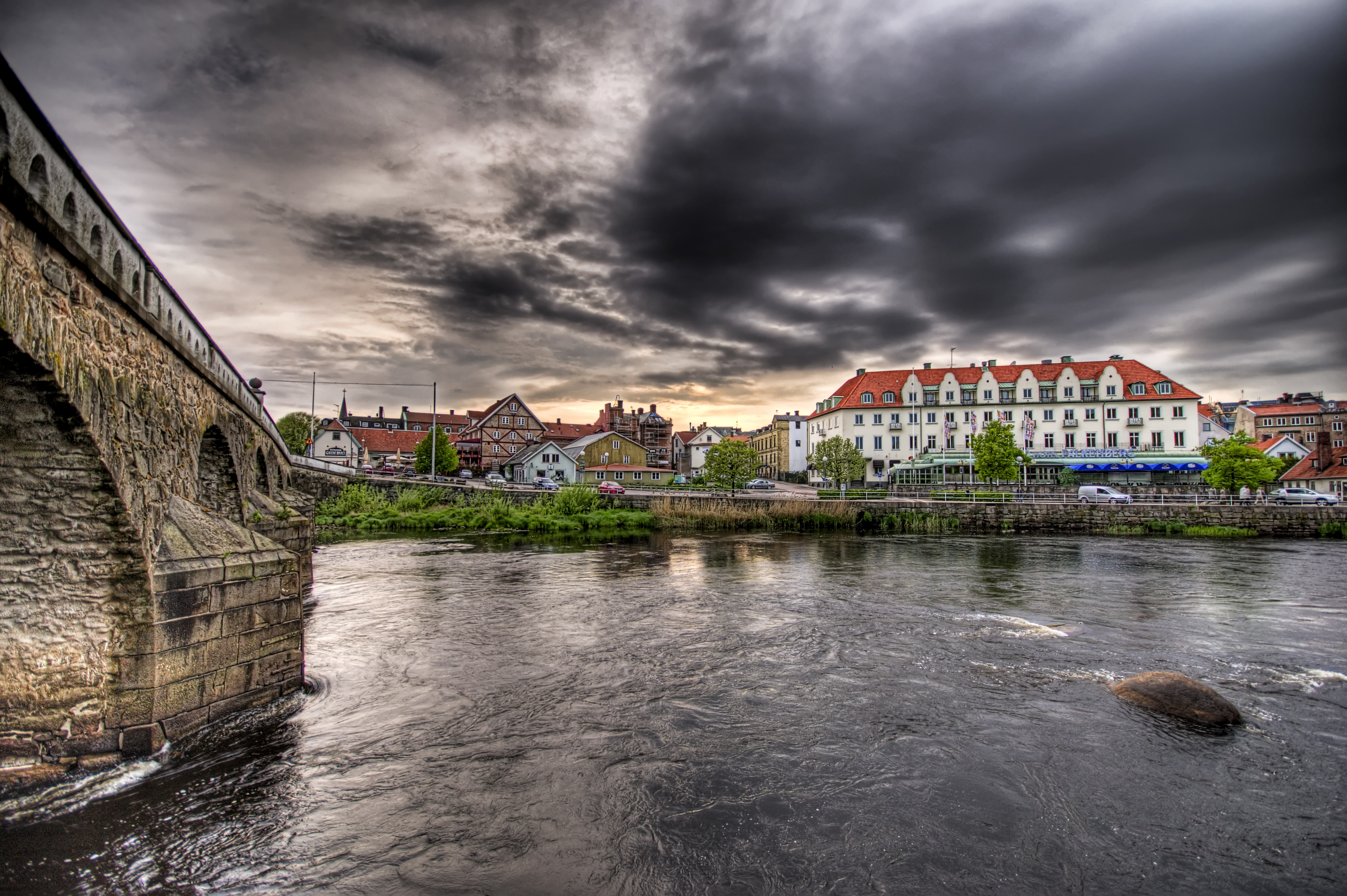
- View from the Tullbron bridge in Falkenberg

- Coat of arms

- Location within Halland Location within Sweden
- Coordinates: 56°54′19″N 12°29′28″E
- Country: Sweden
- Province: Halland
- County: Halland County
- Municipality: Falkenberg Municipality
- Founded: 1558

Area
  - Total: 20.01 km^{2} (7.73 sq mi)
- Elevation: 13 m (43 ft)

Population (18 April 2023)
  - Total: 46,981
  - Density: 1,390/km^{2} (3,600/sq mi)
- Time zone: UTC+1 (CET)
  - Summer (DST): UTC+2 (CEST)
- Postal code: 311 xx
- Area code: (+46) 34
- Website: Official website

Falkenberg is a locality and the seat of Falkenberg Municipality, Halland County, Sweden, with 27,813 inhabitants in 2019 (out of a municipal total of about 45,000). It is located at the mouth of river Ätran. The name consists of the Swedish words for falcon (falk) and mountain (berg). Falkenberg is a popular tourist destination in the summers, and the main beach of the town is Skrea strand.

== History ==
In the early part of the 13th century the Danish king built a fort on the east shore of the river Ätran, which eventually would give the town its name. Halland was at that time part of Denmark. It is known that falconry was pursued in the area. However, in Hallandia antiqua et hodierna, that specified a location ("mountain") where the falconry should have taken place, and which should have given name to the town, has later been shown to be incorrect.

The area north of Ätran was from time to time Norwegian or Swedish. It was on this side that a market town developed. At around 1300 a church was built. From the 14th century until the Northern Seven Years' War (1563—1570) a second town, Ny-Falkenberg (New Falkenberg) was located close to the town. The fort was destroyed by Engelbrekt Engelbrektsson's troops in 1434. The town gained market rights at the latest in 1558.

Along with the rest of the Halland, Falkenberg was to be temporarily Swedish in accordance with the Treaty of Brömsebro (1645). The Treaty of Roskilde thirteen years later made the province permanently Swedish. For a long period it struggled to keep its privileges with regard to trade and jurisdiction from the Danish time. Also like the rest of the county, it only started to slowly industrialise in the late 19th century. The city of Falkenberg was transformed at the municipal reform in 1862 to a city municipality with smaller parts in surrounding country municipalities. In 1908, Herting was incorporated from Skrea Country Mommun, 1937 Arvidstorp from Stafsinge Country Commun and 1950 a small area from Vinberg's country municipality. In 1971, Falkenberg's city in Falkenberg's municipality and the resort is since its central town in the municipality.

In the 20th century it has gained a reputation as a seaside resort.

== Transportation ==
Falkenberg is located along a traditional trade route along the Swedish west coast, about 45 km (28 mi) northwest of Halmstad, and 105 km (65 mi) south of Gothenburg. These transport needs are currently catered by European route E6, which runs as a dual carriageway just outside the town, and the West Coast Railway Line. County road 150 and County road 154 connect to Torup and Svenljunga. Falkenberg railway operated from the 1890s to the 1950s. The town has seven bus routes.

== Areas of the town ==
- Falkagård
- The Old Town
- Herting
- Hjortsberg
- Fajans
- Skogstorp
- Skrea strand
- Tröingeberg
- Västra gärdet
- Östra gärdet
- Arvidstorp
- Näset
- Slätten

== Sport ==
The town hosts several teams at national level. The football team, Falkenbergs FF, has since the late 1980s established itself in the second division (currently Superettan). The table tennis team, Falkenbergs BTK, has won ten national championships, as well as one European championship. In the early 2000s, Falkenbergs VBK developed to become one of the best volleyball teams in the country and accordingly won the national championship 2007. BK Falkarna has played ten seasons in the top bowling league.

Other sports clubs located in Falkenberg include:

- Skrea IF
- Arvidstorps IK
- Vinbergs IF
- Stafsinge IF
- Rinia IF
- IF Böljan

Sport venues in the town include Falkenbergs IP, hosting Falkenbergs Idrottsklubb and IF Böljan, Falcon Alkoholfri Arena hosting Falkenbergs FF, Falkenberg Sports Centre, hosting Falkenbergs VBK and Klitterbadet, a bath house.

== Buildings ==
- Falkenberg Church
- Falkenberg Town Hall
- Falkenberg Old Town Hall
- Falkhallen
- Saint Lawrence church

== Notable people ==
- Annika Andersson, comedian
- Per-Gunnar Andersson, racing driver
- Bo Andersson, businessman
- Rutger Backe, footballer
- Zulmir Bečević, author
- Emma Bengtsson, chef
- Stellan Bengtsson, table tennis player
- Nina Björk, author, journalist, feminist
- Ulf "Tickan" Carlsson, table tennis player
- Walter Dickson, author
- Greczula, singer, grew up in Falkenberg
- Jojje Jönsson, actor
- Erik "Spänst" Svensson, athlete
- Frida Svensson, rower
- Hans Svensson, rower
- Carl-Johan Vallgren, author
- Jan Widströmer, artist
- Pär Zetterberg, football player
- Jesper Karlsson, football player
- Niclas Eliasson, football player
- Olivia Schough, football player
- Anna Takanen, actor, director and writer, grew up in Falkenberg

=== Music groups ===
- Ablaze My Sorrow, death metal band
- By Night, death metal/extreme metal band
- Sonic Syndicate, melodic death metal/melodic metalcore band
- Vains of Jenna, rock band

== Sister cities ==
- Gniezno, Poland

== See also ==
- Falkenberg Farewell
