= Ätran (river) =

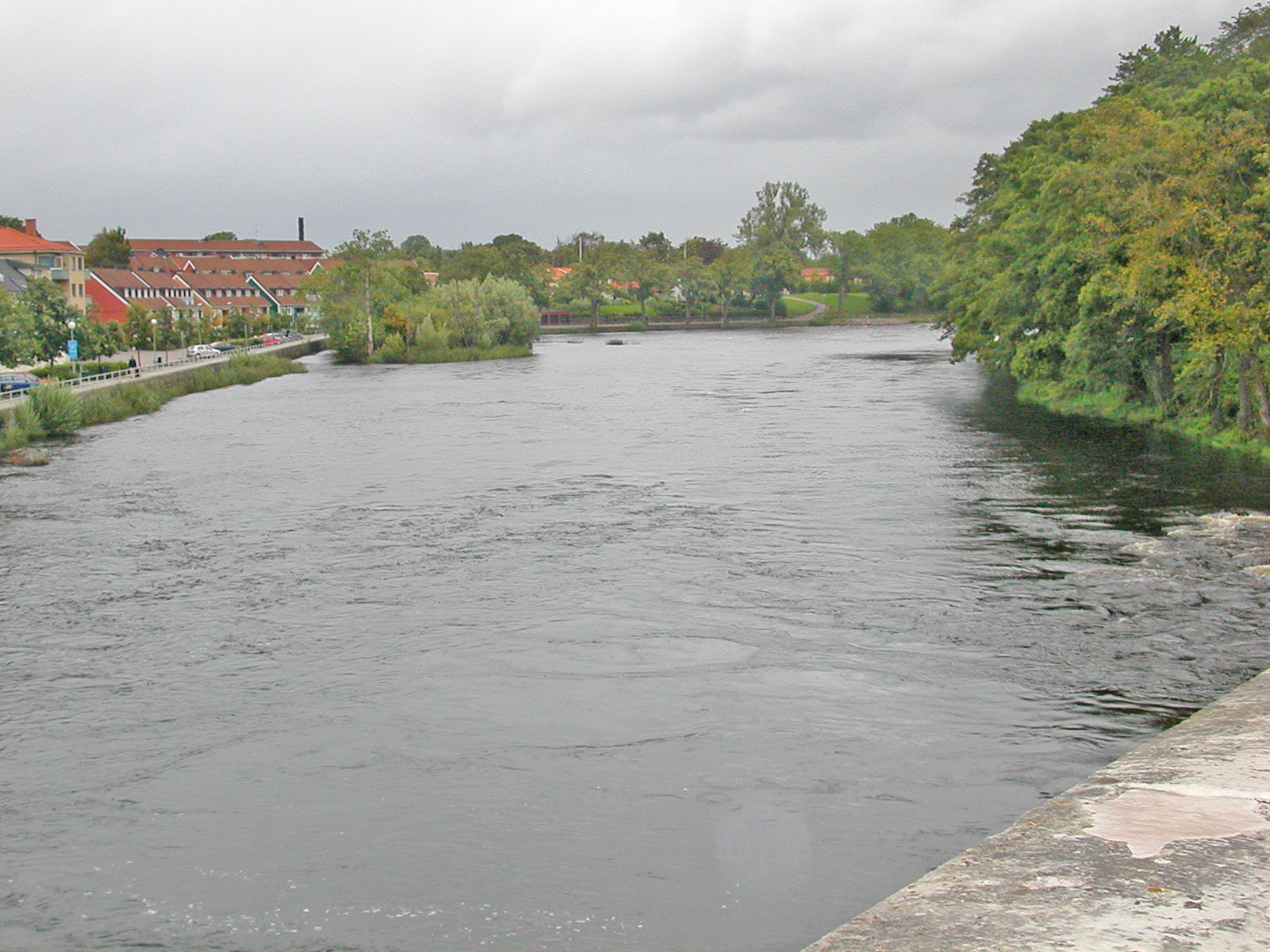
- Ätran in Falkenberg, late-August 2004

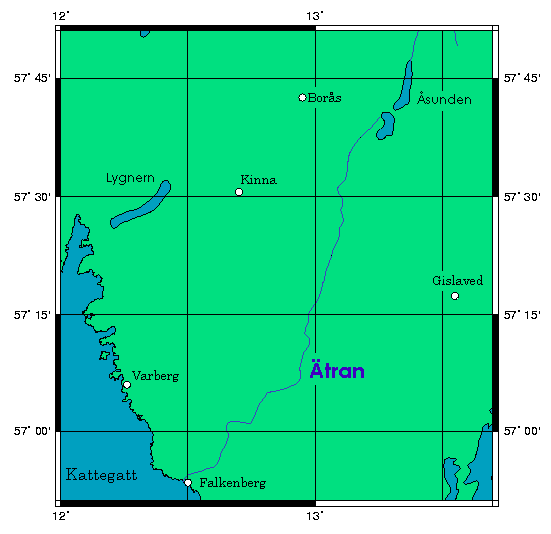
- Path of the river

Location
- Country: Sweden

Physical characteristics
- Source
  - location: Gullered, Västergötland
  - coordinates: 57°46′21″N 13°33′28″E
  - elevation: 332 m (1,089 ft)
- Mouth: Kattegat
  - location: Falkenberg
  - coordinates: 56°53′18″N 12°28′39″E
  - elevation: 0 m (0 ft)
- Length: 240 km (150 mi)
- Basin size: 3,342.2 km^{2} (1,290.4 sq mi)
- Discharge
  - average: 47 m^{3}/s (1,700 cu ft/s)

Ätran is a Swedish river. The river is about 240 kilometres (150 mi) long, and has its source in Gullered, Västergötland, at a height of 332 metres (1,089 ft) above sea level. The river has its mouth in Falkenberg, Halland, where the river enters Kattegat.

The drainage basin covers an area of 3,343 square kilometres (1,291 sq mi), mostly consisting of forest. The river is well known as a good place for fishing. It is comparatively unpolluted.

A historic road, Redvägen, followed the river, along which several medieval battles took place.

== Path, tributaries and drainage basin ==
Area/tributary	Drainage basin (km^{2})	Average water flow (m^{3}/s)
Ätran, upstream Åsunden	650	
Ätran, between Åsunden and Assman	379	8
Assman (Lillån)	652	9.5
Ätran, between Assman and Kalvån	45	24.5
Kalvån (Lillån)	514	8.2
Ätran, between Kalvån and Högvadsån	370	33.5
Högvadsån	476	8.5
Ätran between Högvadsån and the Sea	257	49
Total/Final	3,343	52.5

The river passes through several minor lakes in Västergötland (Sörsjön, Nolsjö, Vinsarpsjö and Lönnern). By the time it reaches Åsunden, it is about 1 to 2 meters deep and 6 to 10 meters wide. As the tributaries named Lillån join the river, it grows considerably in size.

The largest tributary is Högvadsån. Other main tributaries are Assman (Lillån), which join the river close to Örsås church, and Kalvån (Lillån), which join the river close to Östra Frölunda church.

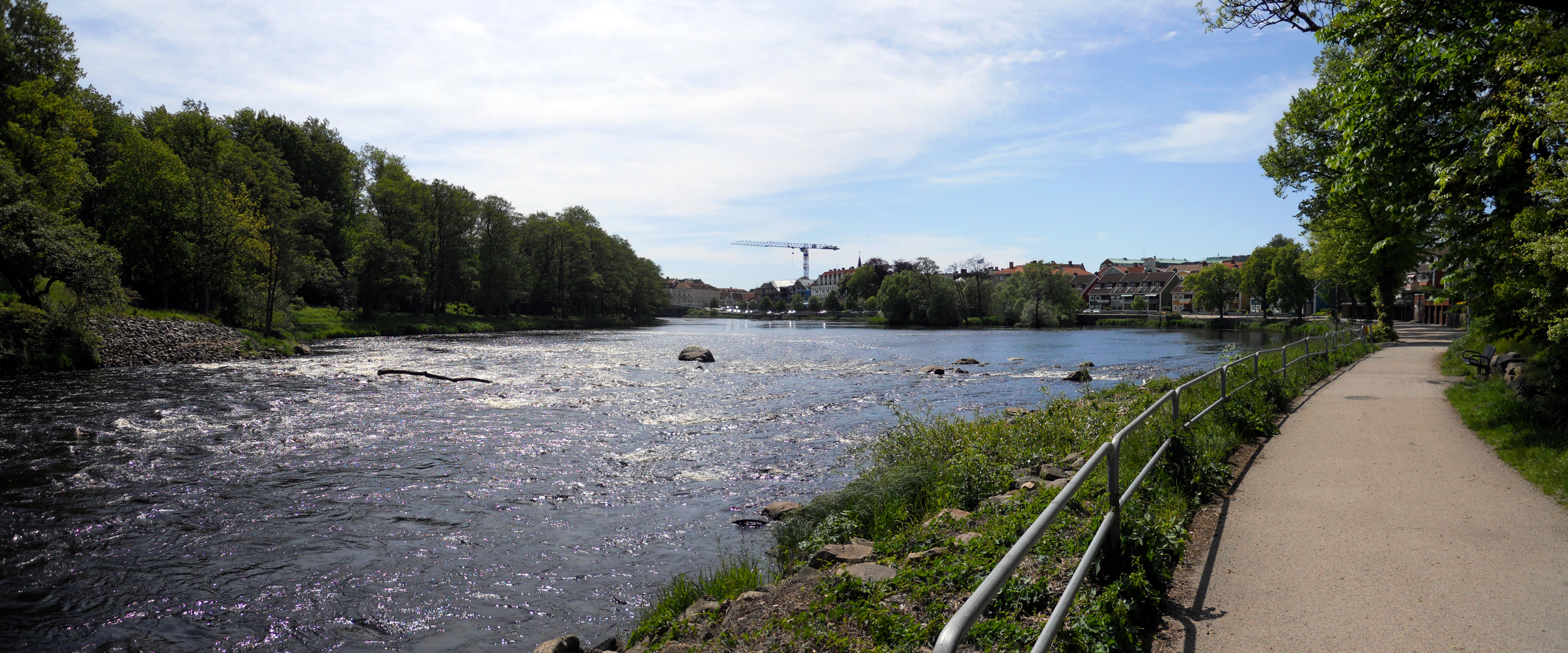
Ätran in June 2010

The drainage basin include the major parts of Falkenberg, Svenljunga, Tranemo and Ulricehamn Municipalities. Smaller parts of Falköping, Borås, Gislaved, Mark, Hylte, and Varberg Municipalities are also part of the drainage basin. Within the basin, 64 percent of the area is forest, 6 percent is lakes, 7 percent is bogs, 11 percent is fields, and 12 percent is other.

The largest lakes within the basin are Åsunden (33.9 km^{2}), Fegen (24.2), Sämsjön (9.2), Lönern (7.7) and Kalven (6.6). In total, there are about 200 km^{2} of lakes within the basin. A record of the water flow at Yngeredsfors Power Station has been kept; it was on average 37.2 m^{3}/s from 1909 to 1967. The maximum flow was 275 m^{3}/s, while the minimum flow was between 5 and 7 m^{3}/s.
