= Vinberg (disambiguation) =

Vinberg is a locality and a parish in Falkenberg Municipality, Halland County, Sweden.

Vinberg may also refer to:

- Vinberg (surname)
- Vinberg Nature Reserve
