= Ullared =

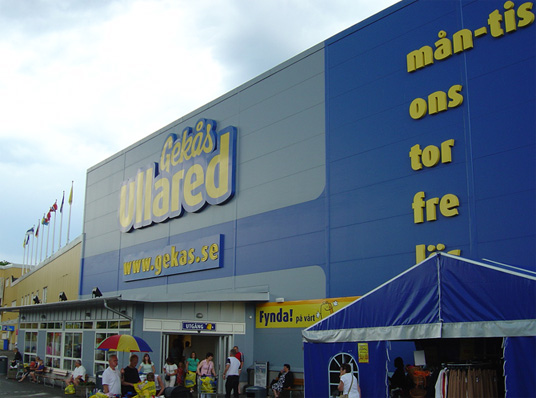
- Gekås, the department store that has made the village well known

- Location within Halland Location within Sweden
- Coordinates: 57°08′10″N 12°42′55″E
- Country: Sweden
- Province: Halland
- County: Halland County
- Municipality: Falkenberg Municipality

Area
  - Total: 1.35 km^{2} (0.52 sq mi)

Population (31 December 2010)
  - Total: 791
  - Density: 586/km^{2} (1,520/sq mi)
- Time zone: UTC+1 (CET)
  - Summer (DST): UTC+2 (CEST)

Ullared is a locality situated in Falkenberg Municipality, Halland County, Sweden, with 791 inhabitants in 2010.

The village hosts a large department store, Gekås. It is the largest store in both Sweden and Scandinavia, and the growth of the store has made Ullared more or less synonymous with low prices among Swedes. A large number of stores, usually in the lower price range, have been established in the village since the early 1990s.

== History ==
Historical railway crossing

Two railways built in the late 19th century and early 20th century, the Falkenberg railway (Falkenberg–Limmared, also called Pyttebanan) and WbÄJ (Varberg–Ätran 1911–1961), had a station in Ullared, which gave it an advantage compared to surrounding villages. The railways closed around 1960. The following decade saw a lot of housing construction and the establishment of many shops and an increase in publishing services.

Pyttebanans hike and bicycle path

Portions of the Pyttebanan is today restored as hiking and bicycle path. Signs along the path show the history of the railway. Today's track starts in Ullared running towards Fridhemsberg. At the entry of Fridhemsberg it crosses the road. Here a building still holds the old sign "Fridhemsberg"s station. Further the track crosses small rivers and streets. It is a well maintained track not only popular in summer.

Building of today's municipality

The municipality merged with Källsjö and Fagered in the 1950s, during the reform by which parish sized municipalities merged to form new units. The next reform in 1971 lead to the village becoming a part of Falkenberg Municipality.

The council adopted a general plan for the village in 2005. The plan assign Ängaberg (an area behind the school) as suitable for residential buildings. Areas to the east of the village are assigned to retailing.

A new road is planned between county road 154 and Gekås, in order to relieve traffic congestion on the central parts of the village. There are long term plans to change the route of county road 154.

== Facilities ==
Apelskolan is a school with about 500 pupils, aged 6 to 15. The village also has a clinic, motel, fire station, care home, slalom slope and a campsite. The village obtains water from Ängaberg.

The area behind Gekås' parking is today Sweden's largest all-year-round campground. There are spaces for RVs, tents as well as cabins for rent. Nearby a lake is located for swimming. Buses transfer campers to Gekås and back.

Gekås continuously expands and dominates the small village of Ullared. In 2016 new parking lots with multiple stories opened to meet the number of visitors. A small hill of granite has been removed to build this parking. Gekås, founded by Göran Karlsson in 1963, is considered as Scandinavia's largest shopping center.

== Geography ==
Several lakes surround Ullared: Kinnasjön, Sonnerängssjön and Musasjön. A stream, Högvadsån, and its tributary, Hjärtaredsån, flows through the village. The village is surrounded by hills, and therefore requires an auxiliary transmitter in order to receive terrestrial television.

The northern part of the village, "Furet", is dominated by detached houses, as is the southern and western parts. The centre is dominated by retailing and there is a minor industrial estate in the southern part called Hedens industriområde.

== Climate ==
Ullared has a hybrid climate between maritime and continental. Since the station's inception, it has arguably been the wettest in Sweden, with Torup further south in Halland's interior being the other contender. The inland position renders vast temperature swings a possibility under conditions favourable to those, such as summer highs above 32 °C (90 °F) during heat waves and winter nights below −20 °C (−4 °F). In winter, freeze-thaw cycles are common, with both rain and snow being frequent. Summer thunderstorms are rather common in the area due to the convection between various air masses.

Climate data for Ullared (2002–2021 averages, extremes since 1995)
Month	Jan	Feb	Mar	Apr	May	Jun	Jul	Aug	Sep	Oct	Nov	Dec	Year
Record high °C (°F)	9.4 (48.9)	14.9 (58.8)	19.9 (67.8)	27.9 (82.2)	29.2 (84.6)	31.3 (88.3)	34.1 (93.4)	33.7 (92.7)	29.1 (84.4)	21.1 (70.0)	15.6 (60.1)	10.4 (50.7)	34.1 (93.4)
Mean maximum °C (°F)	6.5 (43.7)	7.8 (46.0)	13.0 (55.4)	19.9 (67.8)	25.5 (77.9)	27.3 (81.1)	29.1 (84.4)	27.7 (81.9)	23.1 (73.6)	16.7 (62.1)	11.3 (52.3)	7.9 (46.2)	30.0 (86.0)
Mean daily maximum °C (°F)	1.4 (34.5)	2.1 (35.8)	5.8 (42.4)	12.1 (53.8)	16.7 (62.1)	20.1 (68.2)	22.2 (72.0)	21.0 (69.8)	17.2 (63.0)	11.1 (52.0)	6.3 (43.3)	3.1 (37.6)	11.6 (52.9)
Daily mean °C (°F)	−1.1 (30.0)	−0.9 (30.4)	1.7 (35.1)	6.3 (43.3)	10.8 (51.4)	14.3 (57.7)	16.6 (61.9)	15.8 (60.4)	12.4 (54.3)	7.4 (45.3)	3.8 (38.8)	0.8 (33.4)	7.3 (45.2)
Mean daily minimum °C (°F)	−3.5 (25.7)	−3.8 (25.2)	−2.5 (27.5)	0.4 (32.7)	4.8 (40.6)	8.4 (47.1)	10.9 (51.6)	10.5 (50.9)	7.5 (45.5)	3.6 (38.5)	1.3 (34.3)	−1.6 (29.1)	3.0 (37.4)
Mean minimum °C (°F)	−15.0 (5.0)	−13.2 (8.2)	−11.5 (11.3)	−6.5 (20.3)	−3.0 (26.6)	1.8 (35.2)	5.5 (41.9)	4.0 (39.2)	−0.6 (30.9)	−4.8 (23.4)	−7.6 (18.3)	−11.1 (12.0)	−17.2 (1.0)
Record low °C (°F)	−24.1 (−11.4)	−20.9 (−5.6)	−22.2 (−8.0)	−11.3 (11.7)	−5.1 (22.8)	−1.8 (28.8)	2.9 (37.2)	−0.6 (30.9)	−3.1 (26.4)	−10.8 (12.6)	−14.2 (6.4)	−22.9 (−9.2)	−24.1 (−11.4)
Average precipitation mm (inches)	118.3 (4.66)	79.2 (3.12)	70.5 (2.78)	52.9 (2.08)	71.9 (2.83)	91.8 (3.61)	105.8 (4.17)	135.4 (5.33)	114.8 (4.52)	136.1 (5.36)	113.0 (4.45)	128.5 (5.06)	1,218.2 (47.97)
Average precipitation days (≥ 1.0 mm)	14	11	10	8	11	11	12	14	12	14	15	15	147
Source 1: SMHI Open Data for Ullared A, precipitation
Source 2: SMHI Open Data for Ullared A, temperature

== Economy ==
Ullared is dominated by retailing, with not just Gekås, but also a large number of other retailers, of different sizes. In total, there are 1,300 workplaces, and as a result commuting is common.

== Sports ==
The following sports clubs are located in Ullared:

- Ullareds IK

== Literature ==
- Törnblom, Benedict Andreae (1907). Tal till nattvardsbarnen I Ullared år 1866.
- Jonasson, Sven A. (1987). Grundvattenstudier och geologisk dokumentation i SNV:s försökskalkningsområden vid Hagfors, Ullared och Ringamåla. Chalmers tekniska högskola, Göteborgs universitet, Geologiska institutionen.
- Jenny Ericsson (1988). Ullared : en samhällsstudie. Göteborg : Inst. för kulturvård, Göteborgs universitet.
- Lång, Lars-Ove (1992). Geologiska förhållanden i SNV:s försökskalkningsområden vid Ullared, Hallands län, och Ringamåla, Blekinge län. Chalmers tekniska högskola, Göteborgs universitet, Geologiska institutionen.
