= Skogstorp =

Skogstorp may refer to:

- Skogstorp, Eskilstuna Municipality, a locality in Eskilstuna Municipality, Sweden
- Skogstorp, Falkenberg Municipality, a locality in Falkenberg Municipality, Sweden
