= Vinberg =

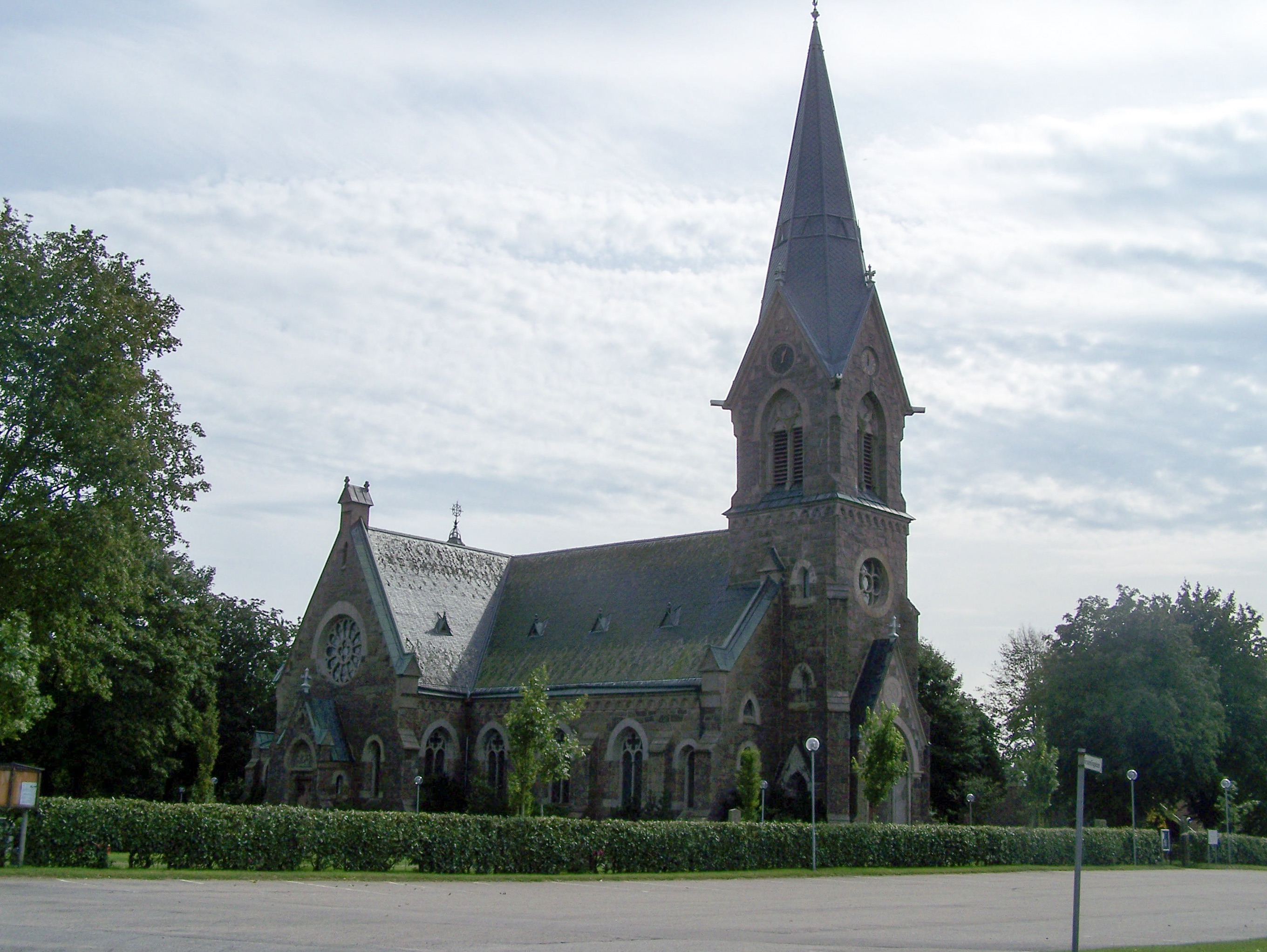
- Vinberg Church, built 1899, here in August 2007

- Location within Halland Location within Sweden
- Coordinates: 56°57′20″N 12°32′58″E
- Country: Sweden
- Province: Halland
- County: Halland County
- Municipality: Falkenberg Municipality

Area
  - Total: 0.45 km^{2} (0.17 sq mi)

Population (31 December 2010)
  - Total: 592
  - Density: 1,325/km^{2} (3,430/sq mi)
- Time zone: UTC+1 (CET)
  - Summer (DST): UTC+2 (CEST)

Vinberg (Swedish pronunciation: [ˈvɪ̂nːbærj]) is a locality and a parish situated in Falkenberg Municipality, Halland County, Sweden, with 592 inhabitants in 2010.

The parish is home to three villages: Vinberg, Vinbergs kyrkby and Tröingeberg, the latter being a suburb of Falkenberg.

== Geography ==
The parish covers an area of 35.5 km^{2}, of which 34.94 is land. Almost all of the land is cultivated, forests cover only 5 percent of the land (as of 1971). The river Ätran delimits the parish in the south west.

Vinberg Nature Reserve is located just south of the locality.

== History ==
Vinberg was first mentioned in writing in 1330–1334. The name is expected to come from vind (wind) and berg (mountain). It is, compared to surround areas, rich on archeological findings. Some of which have been destroyed due to modern cultivation. Kungshögen (English: the Royal Tumulus) in Faurås is one of the objects that have suffered that fate. However, the adjacent kung Fares sten (king Fare's stone) remains intact. Three other brons age tumulii can be found in Faurås, as well as some stone circles. Further remains can be found in Töringe, close to the border to Ljungby and in Hällinge.

The oldest known church was built in the 12th century and demolished in the early 20th century. It was replaced with the larger, currently used, church, built 1899. Some of the inventory, such as two candlesticks, was saved, while a 12th-century baptismal font was destroyed.

The village that bears the name was built around a station along Falkenberg railway.

== Infrastructure ==
County road 154 goes through the western part of the parish, though, until the 1990s went through Vinberg village. Several smaller roads connect Vinberg with surrounding villages; road N700 between Falkenberg and Vessigebro, road N702 between Vinberg village and Vinberg kyrkby, road N701 with Stafsinge and road N750 with Långås.

== Sport ==
It has, for its size, a rather successful football team, Vinbergs IF, currently playing in the fourth division.

== People from Vinberg ==
- Olof von Dahlin, author
- Magnus Svensson, footballer
- Magnus Svensson, floorball
