= Ljungby (disambiguation) =

Ljungby may refer to:

- Ljungby, city in Ljungby Municipality, Sweden
- Ljungby Municipality, municipality in Kronoberg County, Sweden
- Ljungby, Falkenberg, village and parish in Falkenberg Municipality, Sweden
