= Renat vodka =

Swedish vodka

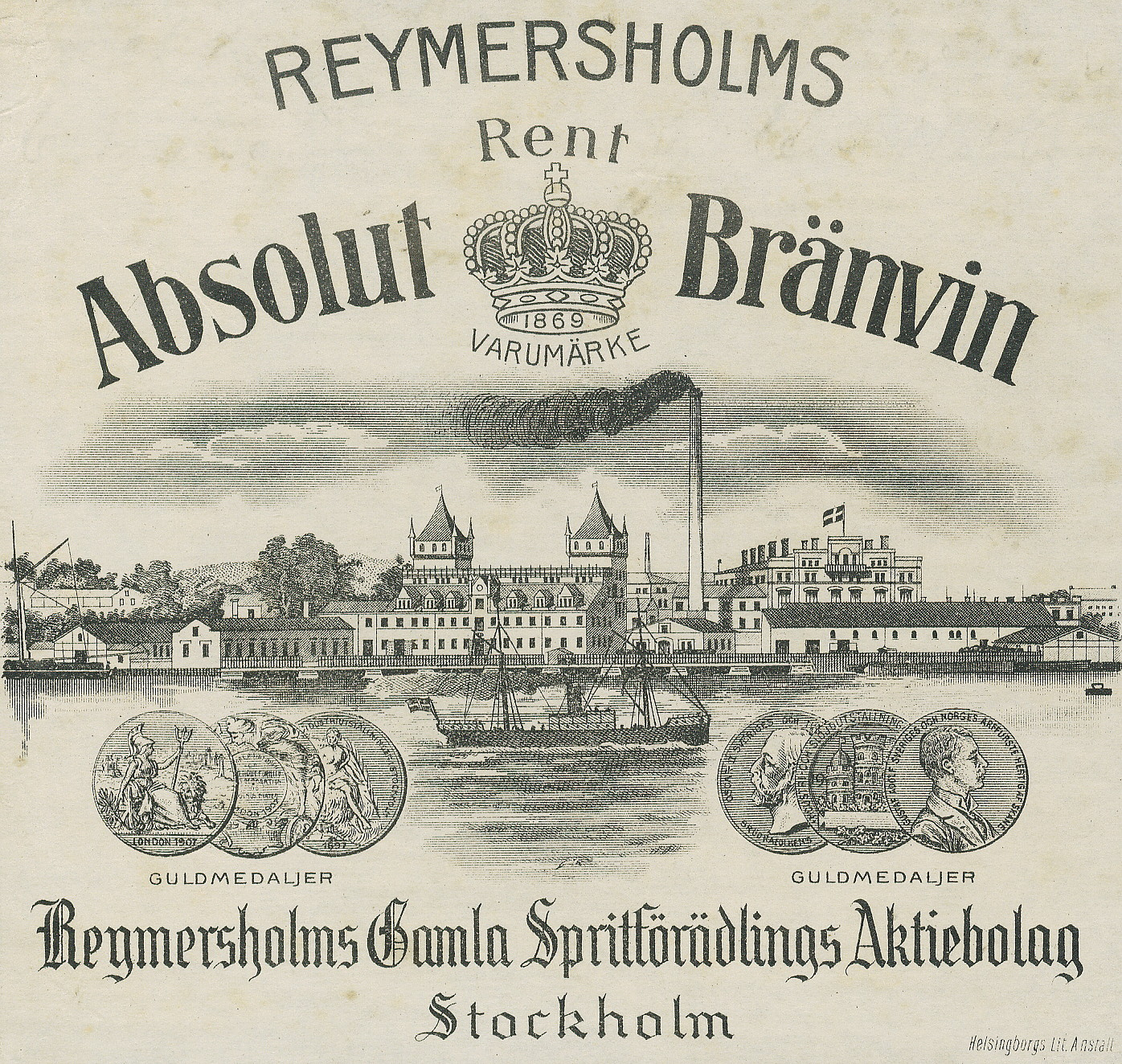
Absolut Rent bränvin, front label

Renat Brännvin is a Swedish brännvin (vodka) with 37.5% alcohol content produced by Vin & Sprit and made from wheat grown in Västergötland in Sweden.

== History ==
In 1877, Lars Olsson Smith launched "Ten-fold purified spirits" or "Absolutely pure spirits" produced in a new distillation boiler at Reimersholme in Stockholm. Since the boiler enabled continuous distillation, the spirit could be purified completely free of fusel and Renat became the first fusel-free spirit in Sweden. It was famous for being purified ten times ("renat" is the Swedish word for "purified").

The product name "Absolutely pure spirits" was changed to Renat in the 1970s to pave the way for the new product Absolut Vodka which was launched in 1979.

Renat is considered to be the Swedish national vodka and was featured in the International Wine and Spirit Competition (IWSC) in 2005 and 2006. In celebration of the brand's 125th birthday, the bottle was redesigned by Jan Johansson, an artist affiliated with Orrefors Glassworks. At the same time, the label was replaced by a new one designed by Roland Ingemarsson. The bottle is manufactured at Limmared's glassworks. In Systembolaget's catalog, Renat has article number one.
