= Falkenberg railway =

Narrow gauge railway in Sweden

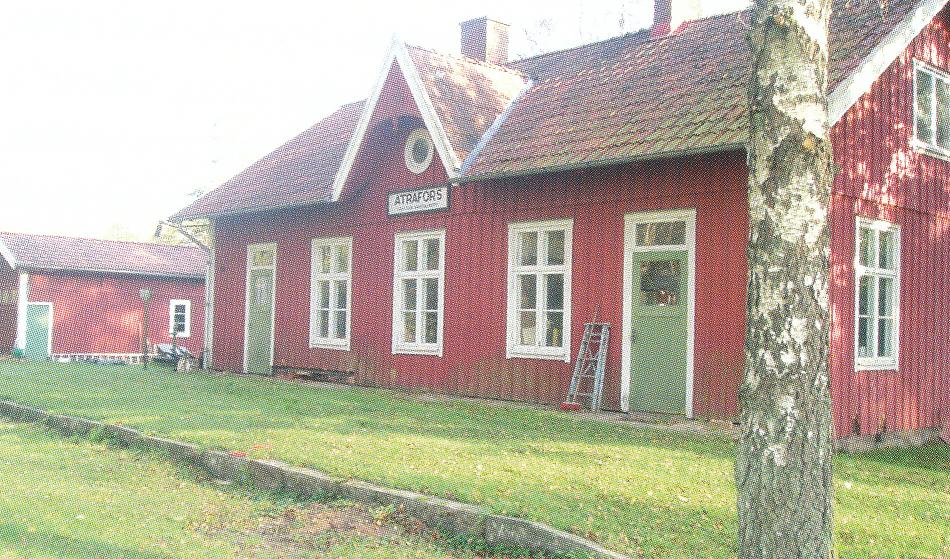
The old train station at Falkenbergs Järnväg in Ätrafors 2007

Falkenberg Railway (Sw. Falkenbergs Järnväg (FJ) or Pyttebanan) was an 891 mm gauge narrow gauge railway line between Falkenberg and Limmared in Sweden. It was inaugurated 28 September 1894 and was in use until 1959/1961.

== History ==
The first plan to build a railway in the area dates back to 1869 and concerned a railway between Falkenberg and Fegen. The plan did however come to nothing. It would take until the construction of Halland Central Railway in 1886 for any further plans to develop.

The traffic commander, Albert Simonsson did put forward a plan for a 30 kilometer long railway between Falkenberg and a village close to Gällared in 1890. A proposal of a 600 mm railway, which would cost 823,000 Swedish Kronor was prepared by Fredrik Arvidsson Posse.

A company was formed at a meeting 16 April 1891 in Ljungby Inn, stocks would be issued for a total value of between 400,000 and 800,000 Swedish Kronor. A founding general meeting was held 2 June 1892. The company's name was to be Falkenbergs Järnvägs AB (English: Falkenberg's Railway Inc.) and county governor Carl Nordenfalk was to be chair.

Concession for the stretch between Falkenberg and Fridhemsberg was granted on 8 July 1892. An earlier application had been rejected in 1891, while an application by rivalling company for a stretch between Varberg to Månsarp had also been granted. The concession was conditioned on some technical changes. Hence, the gauge had to be changed to three foot (891 mm). The work on the railway begun 23 December 1892.

Once the track to Fridhemsberg had been finished a new application was filed. The new application was for a stretch between Fridhemsberg and Älvsered. It was granted on 17 May 1895. The men behind the proposed Varberg-Månsarp route opposed the new application, but it was still granted as they had not been able to secure enough capital to build the railway. However, a number of restrictions were put in place, in the Varberg-Månsarp route was to be built.

Over the following years more and more applications would be filed and concessions granted. Concession to Mjöback was granted on 18 July 1896, to Holsljunga (13 January 1899) and to Limmared (27 April 1900). Further plans to extend the railway to Ulricehamn and Jönköping did however never materialise.

The railway began to face difficulties in the 1930s. The abbreviation, FJ, was popularly read as fattig järnväg (En. poor railway). The railway nationalised in two steps (April 1939 and July 1940) in order to secure its operation. The war years meant a minor renaissance for the railway. That did however not change the long term prospect for the railway and it was closed in two steps (1 November 1959 and 1 May 1961). The rails were removed shortly afterwards.

== Traffic ==
Originally the route was served by mixed sets, i.e. goods and passengers used the same trains. This could substantially increases the travel time as the time needed to load and unload goods substantially exceeded the time needed for passengers to get on and off the train. After a few years separate sets began to be used.

The railway did mainly transport timber, usually destined for Falkenberg harbour and exportation. As long as this trade was substantial the railway remained successful, annually transporting over 50,000 tons of goods. A major blow came in 1921 when export of wood outlawed. Concurrently less and less logging took place and passengers began travelling by cars and buses instead of by train.

World War II was a short relief as shortage of fuel and replacements forced people away from road traffic. After the war the subsiding use of the railway continued until it was closed.

== Sources ==
- Falkenbergs Järnväg's inverkan på Svartrå socken - Rapport från en studiecirkel 1995 i Studieförbundet Vuxenskolans regi
- Historisk om Svenska Järnvägar: Falkenbergs järnväg (in Swedish)
