= Vinbergs IF =

Swedish football club

- Full name: Vinbergs Idrottsförening
- Founded: 1932
- Ground: Vinåvallen; Vinberg; Sweden
- Capacity: 1,000
- Chairman: Tommy Svensson
- Coach: Peter Berta; Jan Bengtsson
- League: Division 2 Västra Götaland
- 2019: Division 2 Västra Götaland, 5th
Home colours	Away colours

Vinbergs IF is a Swedish football club located in Vinberg in Falkenberg Municipality, Halland County.

== Background ==
Vinbergs Idrottsförening is a sports club that was founded in 1932 and has specialised in the football and gymnastics sports. The club's most notable player is Magnus "Turbo" Svensson who played for the Sweden national team. Bandy player Magnus Svensson (who currently plays for Warberg IC) also played football for Vinbergs IF. Former volleyball player Niklas Carlsson, who played for Falkenbergs Volleybollklubb (Fvbk) and the Sweden national team, was a very talented goalkeeper with the football club.

Since their foundation Vinbergs IF has participated mainly in the middle and lower divisions of the Swedish football league system. The club currently plays in Division 3 Sydvästra Götaland which is the fifth tier of Swedish football. The club played 4 seasons in Division 2 Södra Götaland in the 1990s. They play their home matches at the Vinåvallen in Vinberg.

Vinbergs IF are affiliated to Hallands Fotbollförbund.

== Recent history ==
In recent seasons Vinbergs IF have competed in the following divisions:

2011 – Division III, Sydvästra Götaland
2010 – Division IV, Halland Elit
2009 – Division IV, Halland Elit
2008 – Division IV, Halland Elit
2007 – Division IV, Halland
2006 – Division IV, Halland
2005 – Division IV, Halland
2004 – Division III, Sydvästra Götaland
2003 – Division III, Sydvästra Götaland
2002 – Division III, Sydvästra Götaland
2001 – Division III, Sydvästra Götaland
2000 – Division III, Sydvästra Götaland
1999 – Division III, Sydvästra Götaland
1998 – Division II, Södra Götaland
1997 – Division II, Södra Götaland
1996 – Division III, Sydvästra Götaland
1995 – Division III, Sydvästra Götaland
1994 – Division II, Södra Götaland
1993 – Division II, Södra Götaland

== Attendances ==
In recent seasons Vinbergs IF have had the following average attendances:

Season	Average attendance	Division / Section	Level
2001	306	Div 3 Sydvästra Götaland	Tier 4
2002	289	Div 3 Sydvästra Götaland	Tier 4
2003	221	Div 3 Sydvästra Götaland	Tier 4
2004	160	Div 3 Sydvästra Götaland	Tier 4
2005	Not available	Div 4 Halland	Tier 5
2006	Not available	Div 4 Halland	Tier 6
2007	Not available	Div 4 Halland	Tier 6
2008	Not available	Div 4 Halland Elit	Tier 6
2009	194	Div 4 Halland Elit	Tier 6
2010	251	Div 4 Halland Elit	Tier 6

* Attendances are provided in the Publikliga sections of the Svenska Fotbollförbundet website and the European Football Statistics website

The attendance record was set in 1991 when 3,476 spectators watch Svenska Cupen lose to the visiting Malmö FF, 6–1.
