= Gustav Johansson =

Swedish racing cyclist (born 1999)

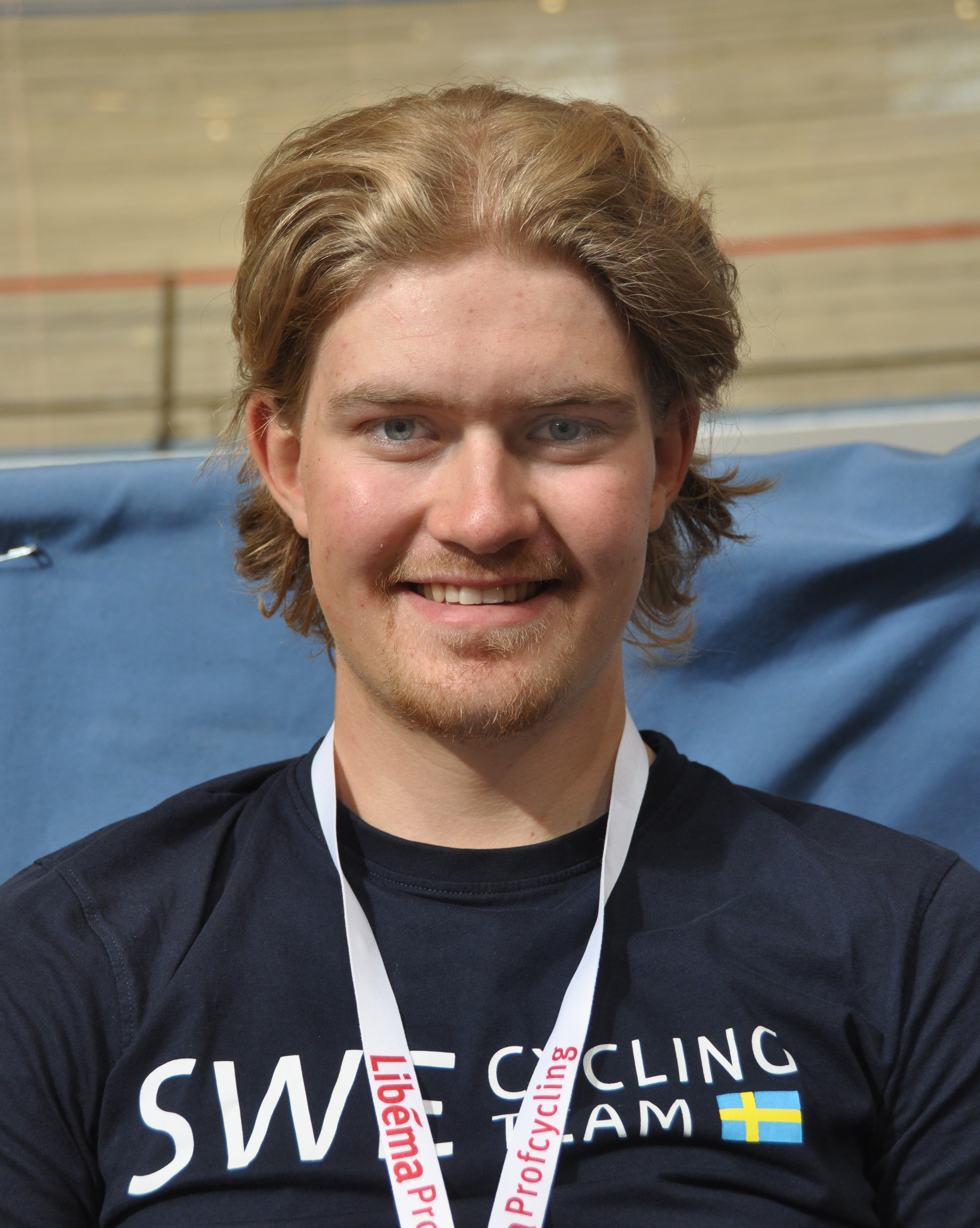
- Gustav Johansson 2021.

Personal information
- Full name: Karl Gustav Oskar Johansson
- Born: 2 May 1999 (age 27) Falkenberg, Sweden

Cycling career
- Sport: Cycling
- Current team: Team Ormsalva AC
- Discipline: Track

Amateur teams
- 2018–2019: Team Ormsalva AC
- 2020–2021: Team IBT-Ridley Sydkisten
- 2021–: Team Ormsalva AC

Gustav Johansson (born May 2, 1999) is a Swedish cyclist specializing in track cycling.

== Personal life ==
Johansson was raised in Glommen, Sweden. He currently lives in Mallorca.

== Career ==
He will compete in 2022 for Team Ormsalva-Bianchi. Johansson has also competed in road cycling, and took ninth place in the Swedish Championships in Uppsala 2020.

== Major results ==
2020
9th Road race, National Road Championships

== Gallery ==
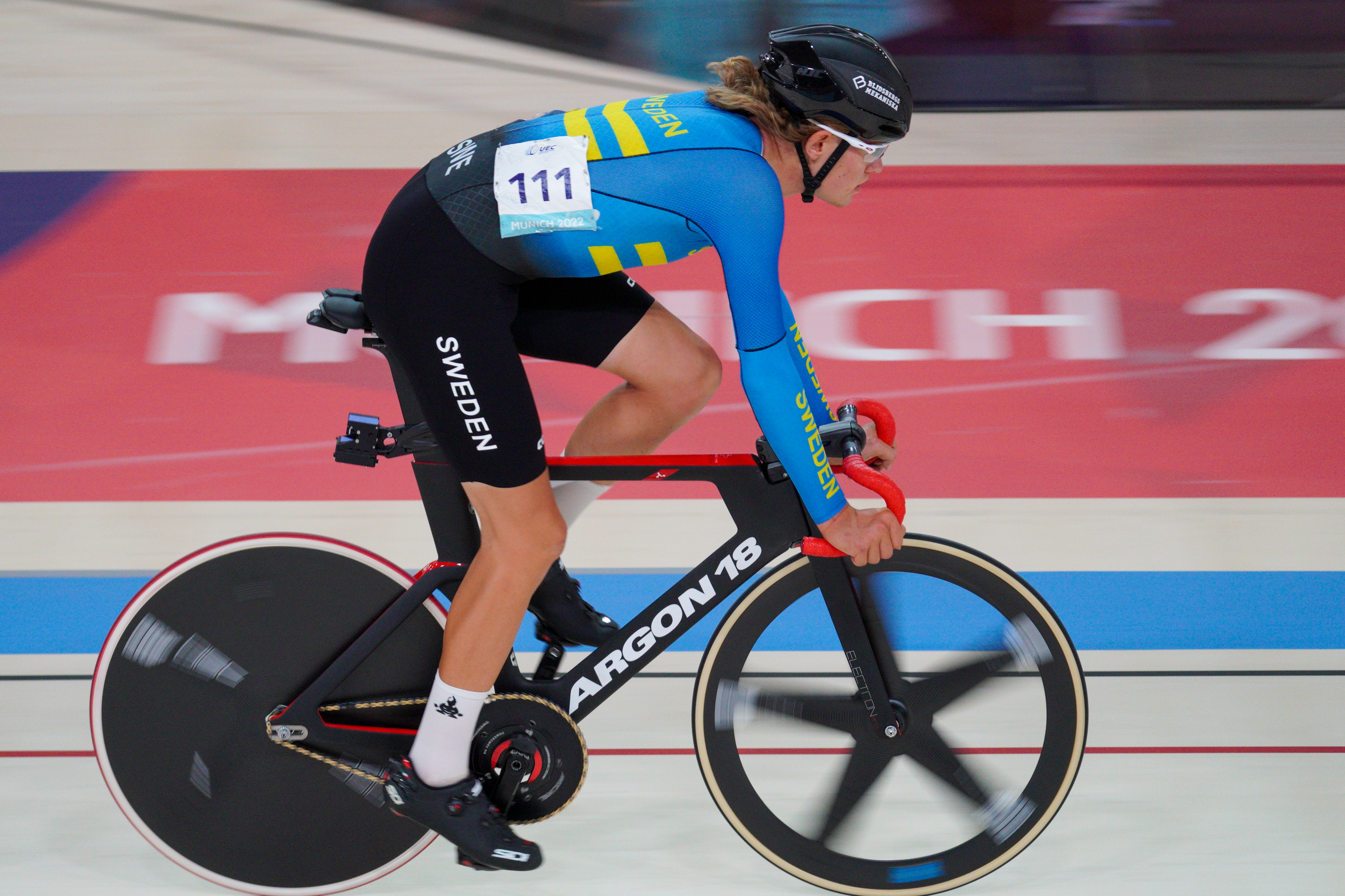
Gustav Johansson at the European Championships in Munich 2022.
