= Gekas =

Gekas is a Greek surname. Notable people with the surname include:

- Theofanis Gekas, Greek athlete
- George Gekas, Pennsylvanian politician

== See also ==
- Gekås
