= Skrea IF =

Swedish football club

- Full name: Skrea Idrottsförening
- Founded: 1931
- Ground: Skrea IP; Skrea; Sweden
- Head coach: Uno Andersson
- Coach: Martin Blomqvist
- League: Division 4 Halland Elit
Home colours

Skrea IF is a Swedish football club located in Skrea, Falkenberg Municipality.

== Background ==
Skrea IF currently plays in Division 4 Halland Elit which is the sixth tier of Swedish football. They play their home matches at the Skrea IP in Falkenberg.

The club is affiliated to Hallands Fotbollförbund.

== Season to season ==
Season	Level	Division	Section	Position	Movements
2006*	Tier 7	Division 5	Halland Södra	2nd	Promotion Playoffs
2007	Tier 7	Division 5	Halland Södra	10th	
2008	Tier 7	Division 5	Halland Södra	1st	Promoted
2009	Tier 6b	Division 4	Halland	1st	Promoted
2010	Tier 6a	Division 4	Halland Elit	9th	
2011	Tier 6a	Division 4	Halland Elit		

* League restructuring in 2006 resulted in a new division being created at Tier 3 and subsequent divisions dropping a level.
