= Skreanäs =

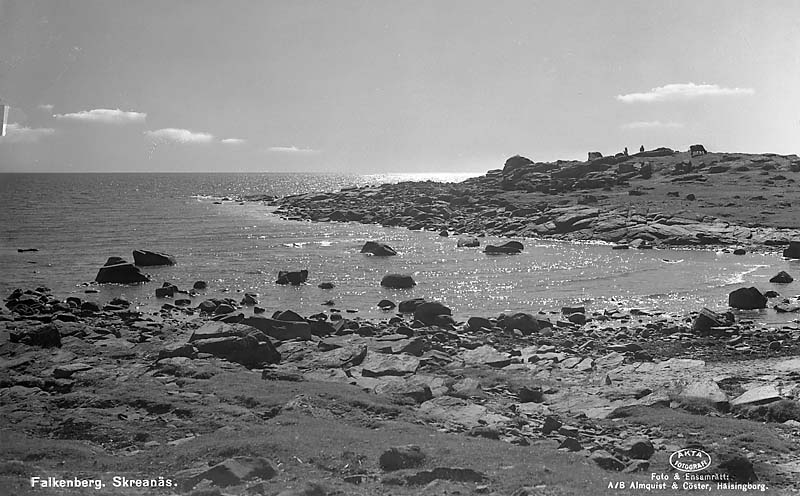

- Location within Halland Location within Sweden
- Coordinates: 56°52′20″N 12°31′57″E
- Country: Sweden
- Province: Halland
- County: Halland County
- Municipality: Falkenberg Municipality

Area
  - Total: 0.19 km^{2} (0.073 sq mi)

Population (31 December 2010)
  - Total: 243
  - Density: 1,271/km^{2} (3,290/sq mi)
- Time zone: UTC+1 (CET)
  - Summer (DST): UTC+2 (CEST)

Skreanäs is a locality situated in Falkenberg Municipality, Halland County, Sweden with 243 inhabitants in 2010.
