= Höstena springs =

Coordinates: 57.0081°N 12.64815°E

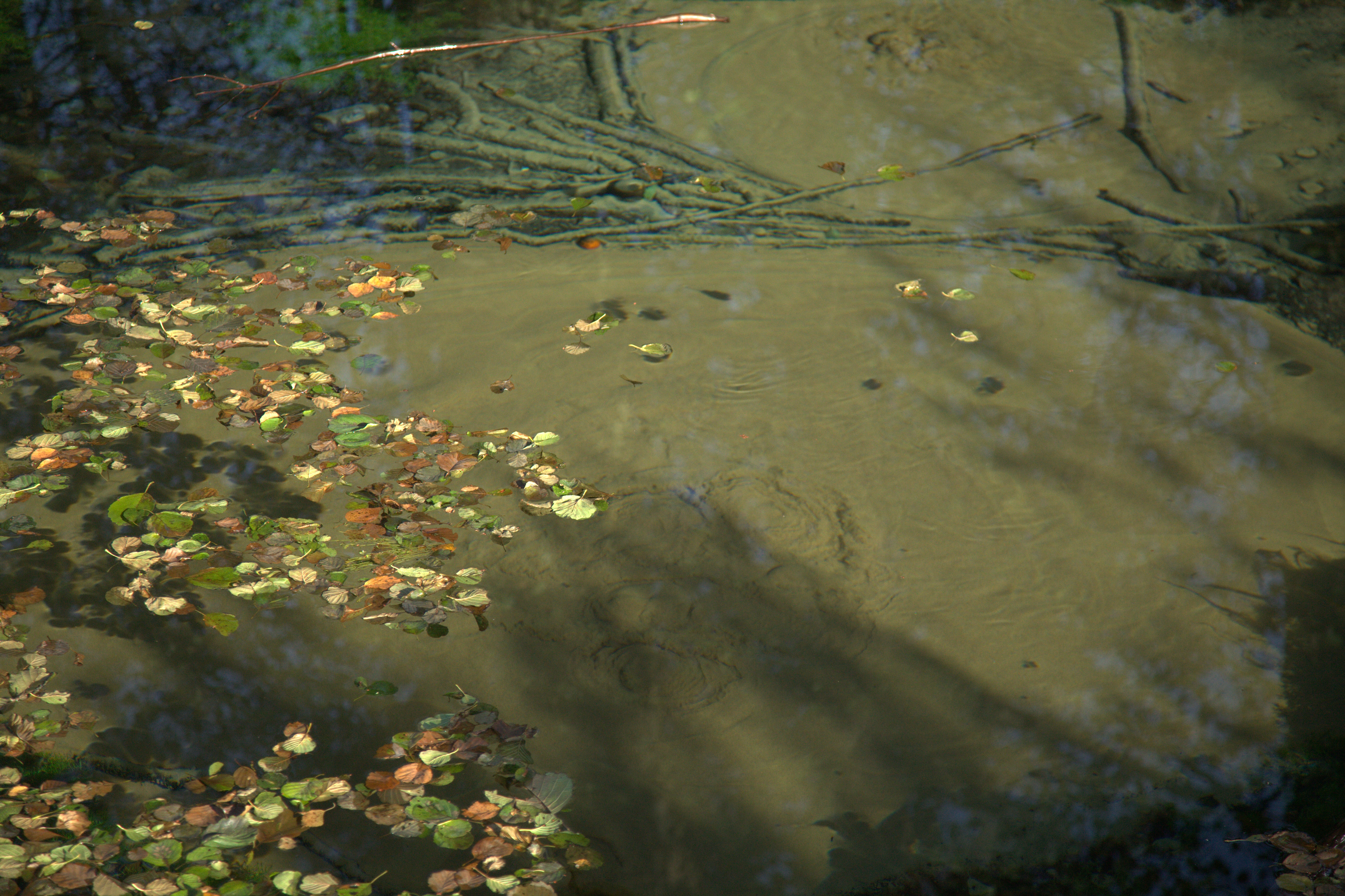
Bottom of the larger of Kalle brunnar

Höstena springs (Swedish: Höstena källor) are the collective name for several springs in Ljungby, Falkenberg, Sweden.

The largest of the springs is Kalle brunnar, which actually consists of two springs close to each other. The water from the springs ends up in the river Ätran. The springs were previously called Larängs källor. The minor of the springs has been closed.

Rangeli brunnar/Ragnhilds källa can be found a few hundred meters south west of Kalle brunnar. It is associated with several legends. A third spring, Lyngbacka-källan, is associated with legends as well.

== Sources ==
- En bok om Ljungby, Kommittén för kulturforskning i Vinbergs kommun. 1971. Falkenberg: Hallands Nyheter AB (in Swedish)
