= Ätran =

Ätran may refer to:

- Ätran (river), river in south-western Sweden
- Ätran (locality), locality in Falkenberg Municipality, Sweden, named after the river
