= Vinberg Nature Reserve =

Nature reserve in Halland, Sweden

Coordinates: 56.941941°N 12.547495°E

Vinberg Nature Reserve (Swedish: 'Vinbergs naturreservat, Vinberg') is a municipal nature reserve in Falkenberg Municipality, Halland County, Sweden, its area is 14.02 ha. It was established by the municipality in 2003 and managed by it. NUTS code: SE231.

The reserve is located just south of Vinberg locality. Vinån rivulet (tributary of Ätran) flows across the reserve.
