= Johannes Vall =

Swedish footballer

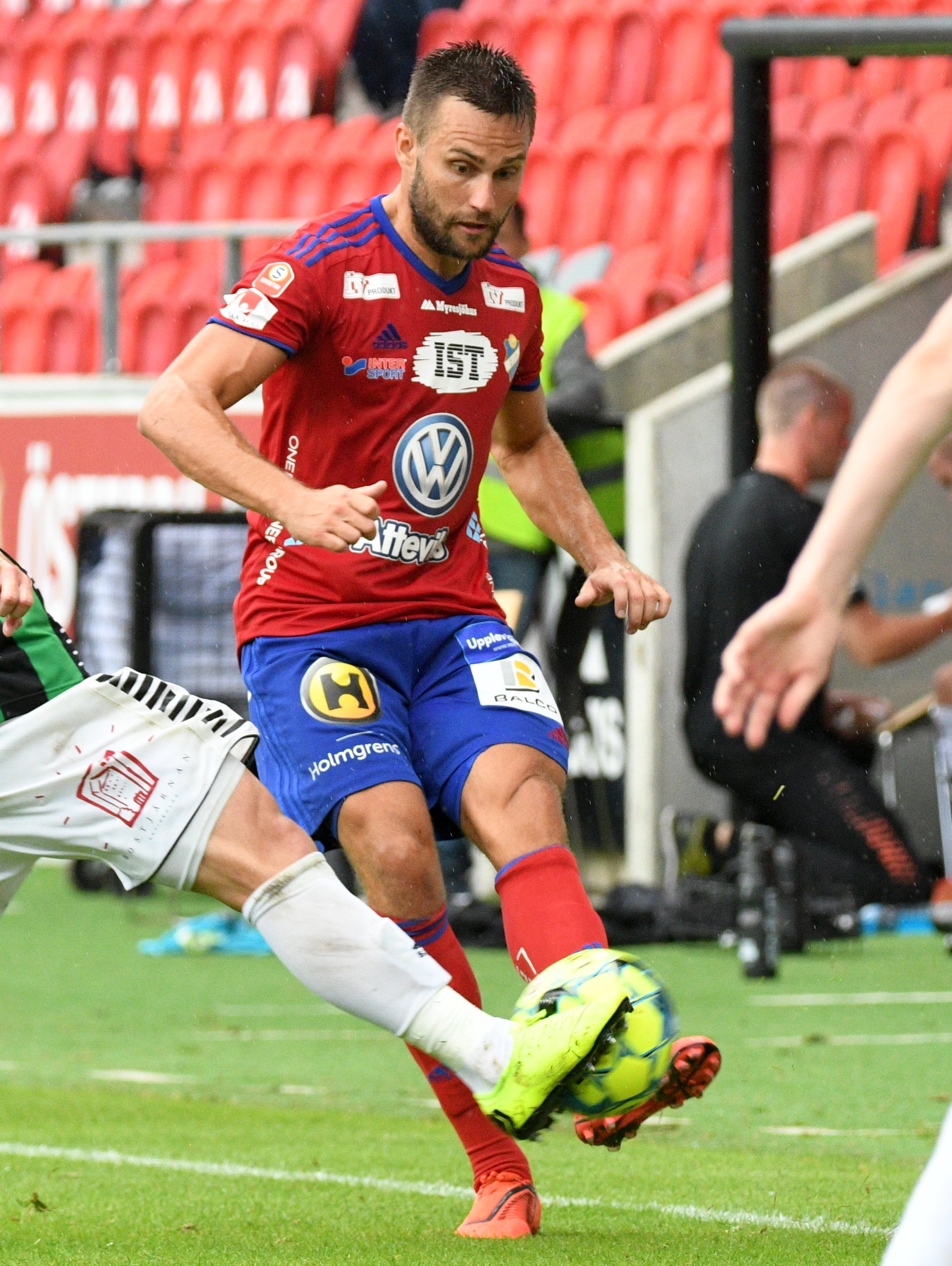

Personal information
- Full name: Johannes Björn Vall
- Date of birth: 19 October 1992 (age 34)
- Place of birth: Falkenberg, Sweden
- Height: 1.83 m (6 ft 0 in)
- Position: Left back

Team information
- Current team: ÍA
- Number: 3

Youth career
- Skrea IF
- –2009: Falkenbergs FF

Senior career*
Years	Team	Apps	(Gls)
2009–2017	Falkenbergs FF	116	(8)
2017–2019	IFK Norrköping	6	(0)
2019	→ Östers IF (loan)	14	(0)
2020–2021	Ljungskile SK	14	(0)
2021	Valur	18	(0)
2022–	ÍA	112	(8)

International career
2009	Sweden U17	3	(0)
- * Club domestic league appearances and goals as of 1 November 2026

Johannes Vall (born 19 October 1992) is a Swedish footballer who plays for ÍA

== Career ==
=== Club career ===
Vall started playing football in Skrea IF when he was 5–6 years old. Later during his youth years, he moved to Falkenbergs FF. He made his debut for the clubs professional team against IFK Norrköping in the last round of the 2009 Superettan. The match ended 1-1 and Vall was replaced in the 82nd minute. In the 2010 season, he played three matches, all as a substitute. In 2011, Vall played eight matches, of which three matches from the start and made one assist. After the season, he extended his contract by two years.

During the 2012 and 2013 seasons, he played a total of 14 matches due to a lot of injuries. During his Allsvenskan debut season, Vall played 22 matches, three from the start, and he scored four goals. In December 2014, he extended his contract by two years. During the 2016 season, he mainly played as a left back. In December 2016, he extended his contract by one year.

In August 2017, Vall was signed by IFK Norrköping, where he signed a 2.5-year contract. In July 2019, Vall was loaned out to Östers IF for the rest of the 2019 season.

On 13 January 2020, Vall was recruited by Ljungskile SK, where he signed a one-year contract. On 18 February 2021 it was announced Vall had signed for the Icelandic champions Valur.
