= Bengtesgård meadow =

Nature reserve in Halland, Sweden

Coordinates: 56°58′15″N 12°29′15″E

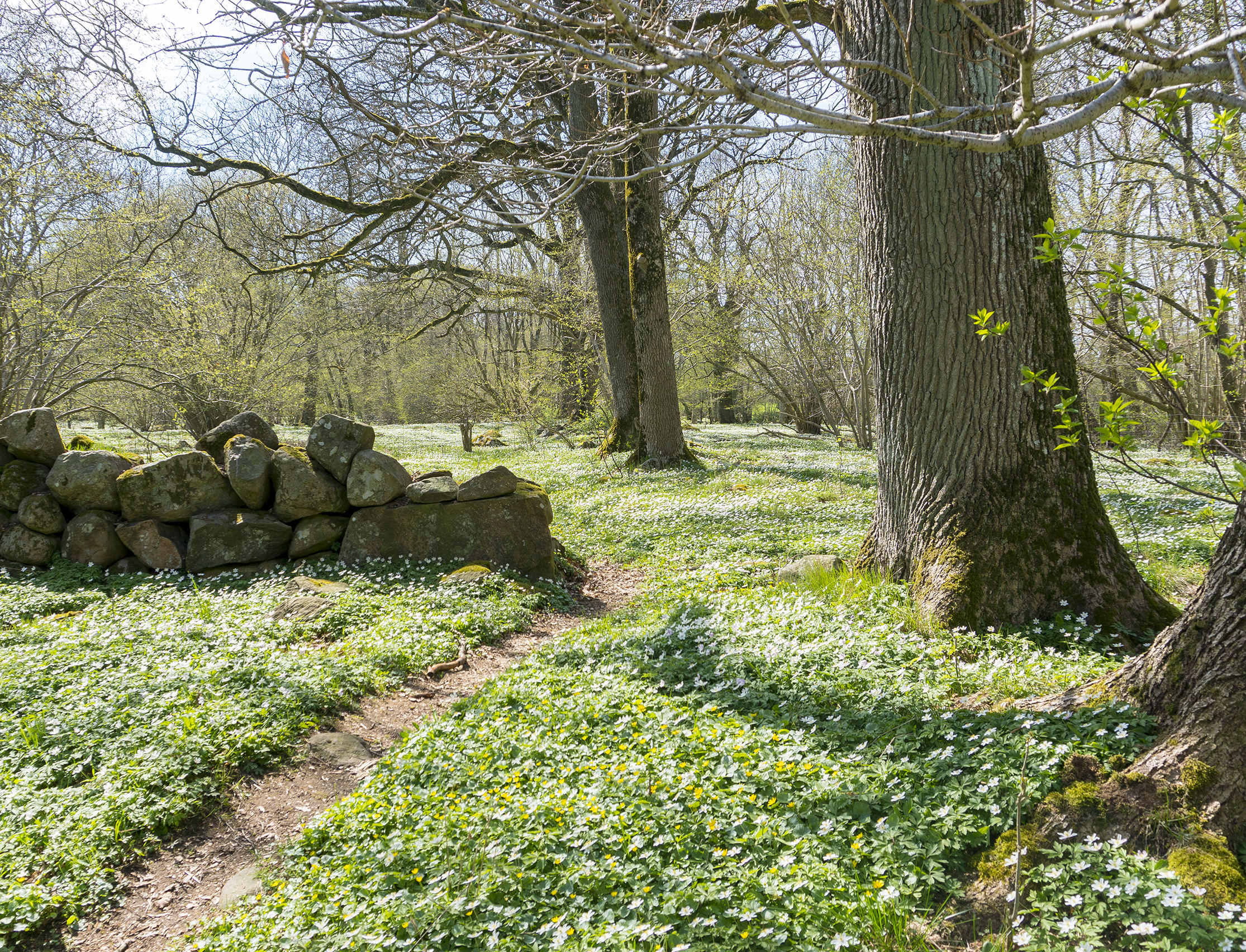
Bengtsegård meadow, April 2018

Bengtesgård meadow (Swedish: Bengtesgårds äng) is a nature reserve in Falkenberg Municipality, Sweden. It has an area of 4.4 hectares (11 acres) and has been protected since 1972. Hawfinches nest in the area. and another red-listed species, Grifola frondosa, can be found on the ground.
