= Grimsholmen =

Nature reserve in Halland, Sweden

Coordinates: 56°50′31″N 12°33′29″E

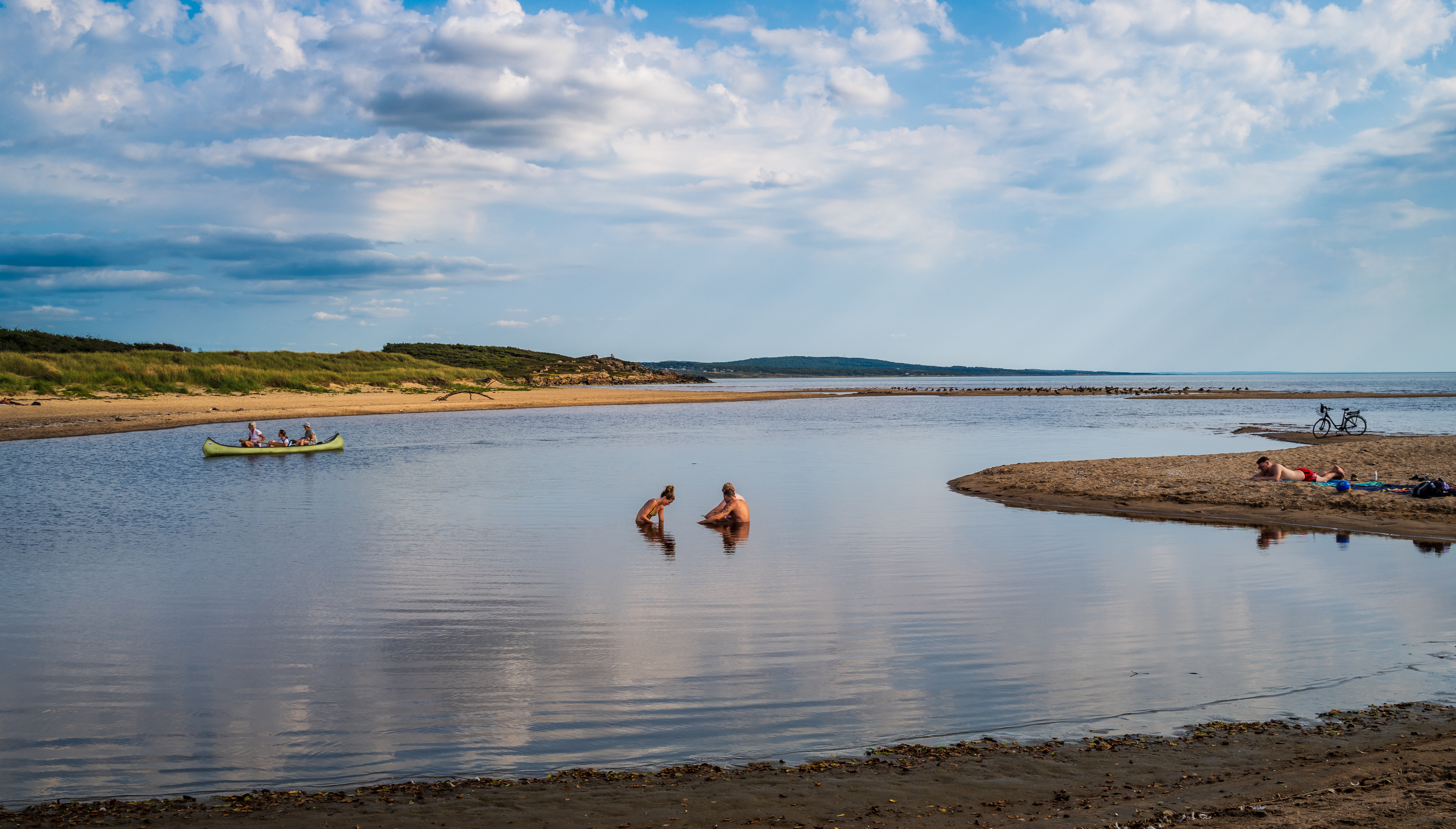
Grimsholmens Nature Reserve

Grimsholmen is a nature reserve in Falkenberg Municipality, Halland County, Sweden. It is located 7.5 kilometers southeast of Falkenberg center and has an area of 173 hectares, of which 70 is land. It has been protected since 1992 in order to protect the coastal heath.

== Historical interest ==
Remains from the Bronze Age has been found within the reserve. During the Bronze Age it was common to bury ranking chieftains in elevated locations near the sea shore like Grimsholmen - as a result there are a number of cairns and stone patterns there. On the cairn at the highest area to the north of the reserve, a stone-chamber tomb large enough to require five ceiling slabs (takhällar) can be found.
