= Heberg =

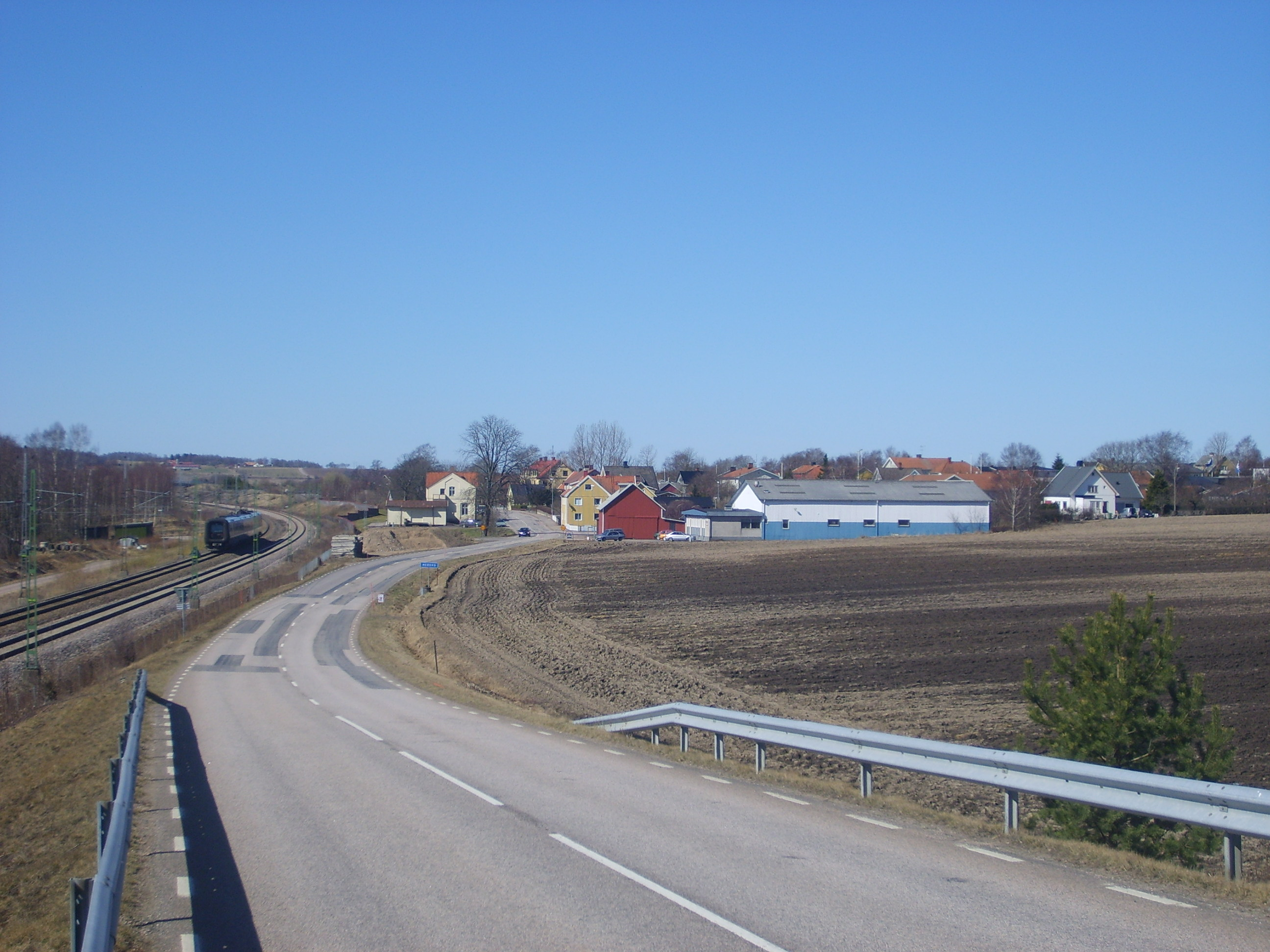
- Heberg village with West Coast Line at the left

- Location within Sweden
- Coordinates: 56°53′N 12°38′E
- Country: Sweden
- Province: Halland
- County: Halland County
- Municipality: Falkenberg Municipality

Area
  - Total: 0.71 km^{2} (0.27 sq mi)

Population (31 December 2010)
  - Total: 449
  - Density: 632/km^{2} (1,640/sq mi)
- Time zone: UTC+1 (CET)
  - Summer (DST): UTC+2 (CEST)

Heberg is a locality situated in Falkenberg Municipality, Halland County, Sweden, with 450 inhabitants in 2010.
