= Högvads BK =

Swedish football club

- Full name: Högvads Bollklubb
- Founded: 2001
- Ground: Stråv; Holsljunga; Sweden
- Chairman: Jan Berndtsson
- League: Division 4 Västergötland Södra
Home colours

Högvads BK is a Swedish football club located in Holsljunga.

== Background ==
Högvads BK currently plays in Division 4 Västergötland Södra which is the sixth tier of Swedish football. They play their home matches at the Stråvi in Holsljunga.

The club is affiliated to Västergötlands Fotbollförbund.

== Season to season ==
Season	Level	Division	Section	Position	Movements
2004	Tier 5	Division 4	Västergötland Södra	6th	
2005	Tier 5	Division 4	Västergötland Södra	4th	
2006*	Tier 6	Division 4	Västergötland Södra	7th	
2007	Tier 6	Division 4	Västergötland Södra	5th	
2008	Tier 6	Division 4	Västergötland Södra	5th	
2009	Tier 6	Division 4	Västergötland Södra	12th	Relegated
2010	Tier 7	Division 5	Västergötland Södra	1st	Promoted
2011	Tier 6	Division 4	Västergötland Södra		

* League restructuring in 2006 resulted in a new division being created at Tier 3 and subsequent divisions dropping a level.
