= Skrea =

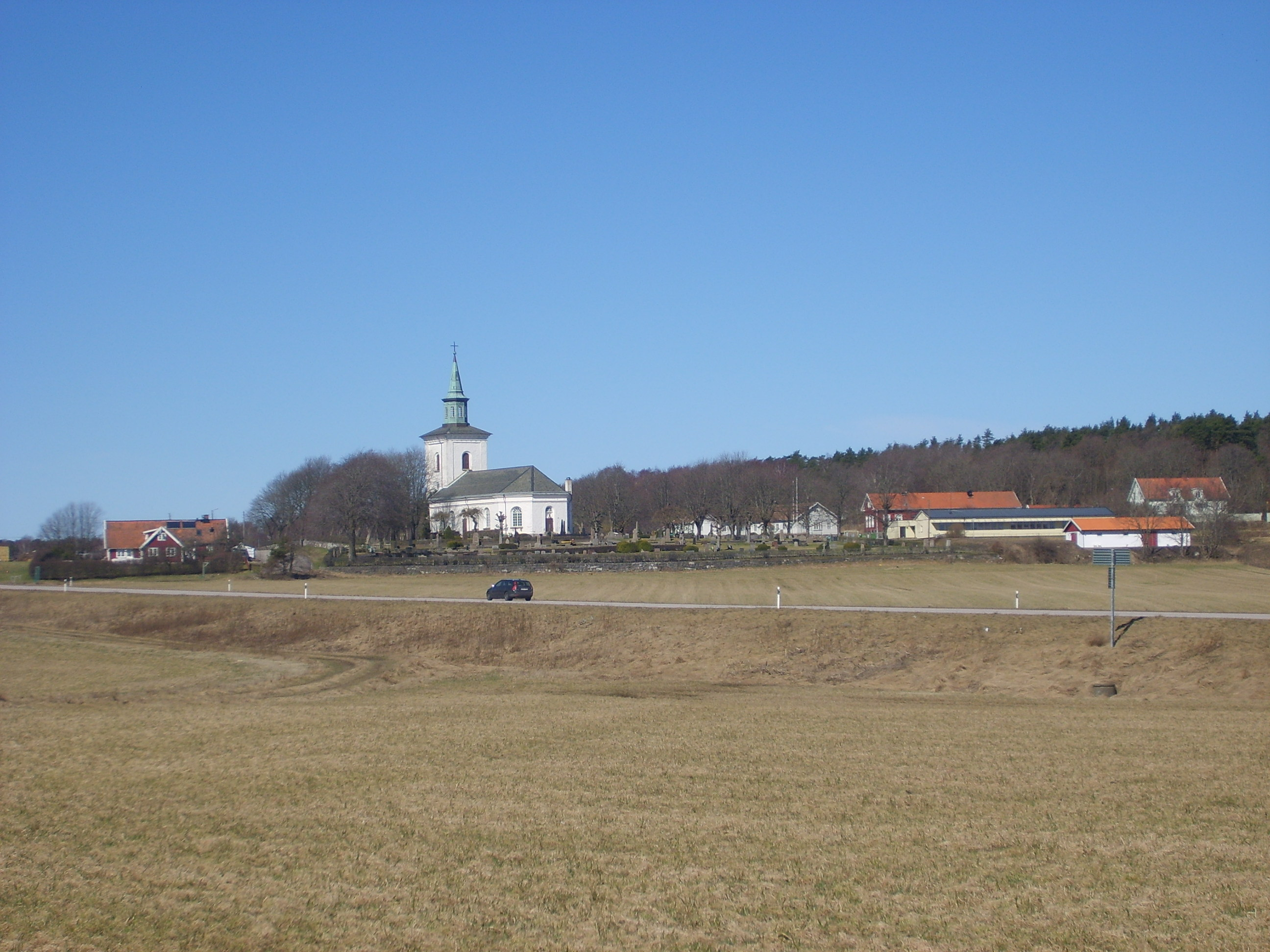
- Skrea Village and Skrea Church

- Location within Halland Location within Sweden
- Coordinates: 56°51′53″N 12°33′57″E
- Country: Sweden
- Province: Halland
- County: Halland County
- Municipality: Falkenberg Municipality

Area
  - Total: 1.02 km^{2} (0.39 sq mi)

Population (31 December 2010)
  - Total: 1,064
  - Density: 1,047/km^{2} (2,710/sq mi)
- Time zone: UTC+1 (CET)
  - Summer (DST): UTC+2 (CEST)

Skrea is a locality in Falkenberg Municipality, Halland County, Sweden, with 1,064 inhabitants in 2010.

It was first mentioned in writing in 1447. Remains of houses used 100–550 have been found in the village. The nature reserve Grimsholmen is near the village.
