= Ringsegård =

- Location within Halland Location within Sweden
- Coordinates: 56°52′N 12°33′E
- Country: Sweden
- Province: Halland
- County: Halland County
- Municipality: Falkenberg Municipality

Area
  - Total: 0.50 km^{2} (0.19 sq mi)

Population (31 December 2010)
  - Total: 446
  - Density: 888/km^{2} (2,300/sq mi)
- Time zone: UTC+1 (CET)
  - Summer (DST): UTC+2 (CEST)

Ringsegård is a locality situated in Falkenberg Municipality, Halland County, Sweden, with 446 inhabitants in 2010.
