= Morup =

- Location within Halland Location within Sweden
- Coordinates: 56°59′N 12°24′E
- Country: Sweden
- Province: Halland
- County: Halland County
- Municipality: Falkenberg Municipality

Area
  - Total: 0.53 km^{2} (0.20 sq mi)

Population (31 December 2010)
  - Total: 259
  - Density: 489/km^{2} (1,270/sq mi)
- Time zone: UTC+1 (CET)
  - Summer (DST): UTC+2 (CEST)

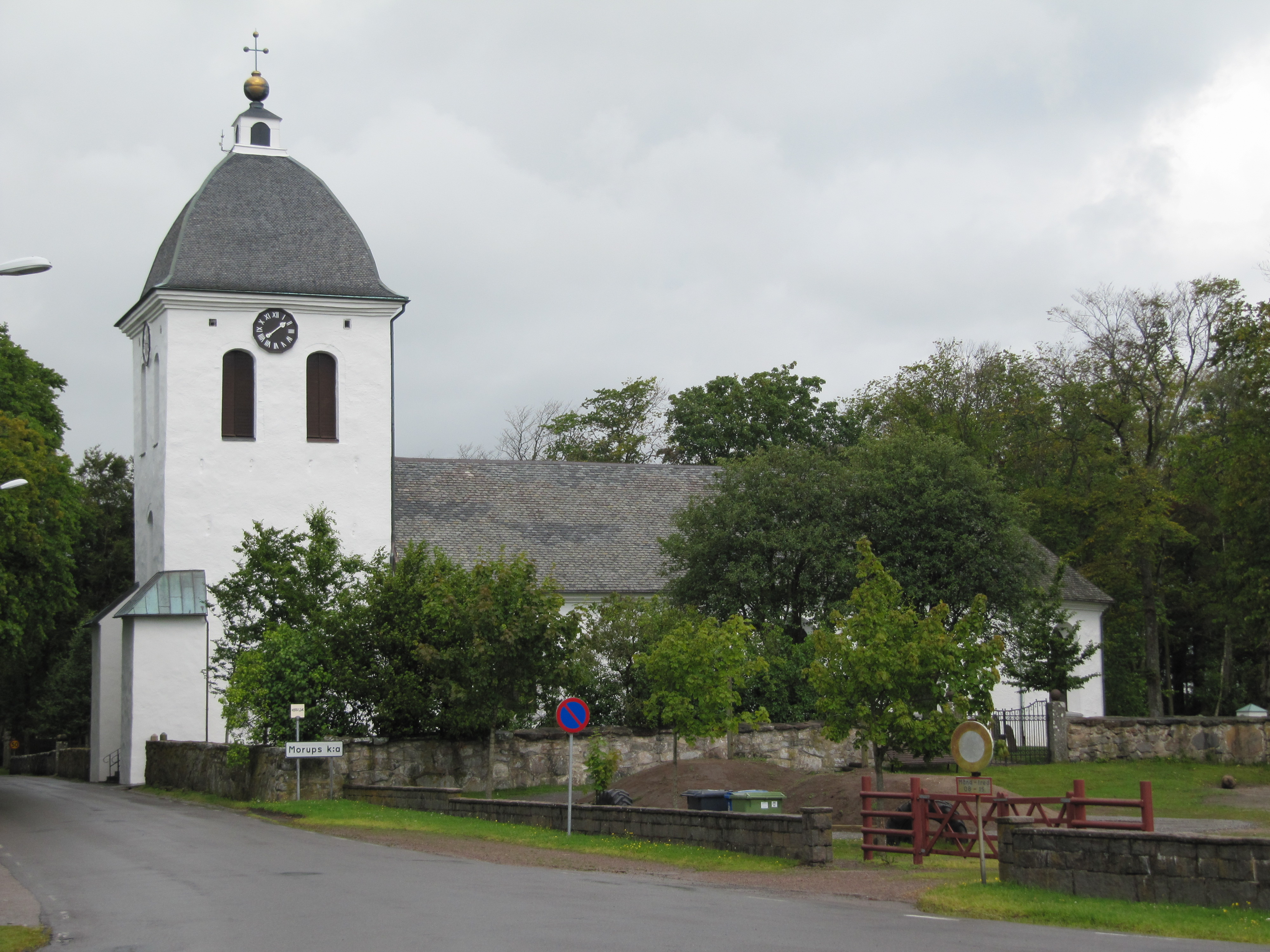
Morup Church viewed from the south.

Morup is a locality situated in Falkenberg Municipality, Halland County, Sweden, with 259 inhabitants in 2010.
