= Glommen, Falkenberg Municipality =

Glommen
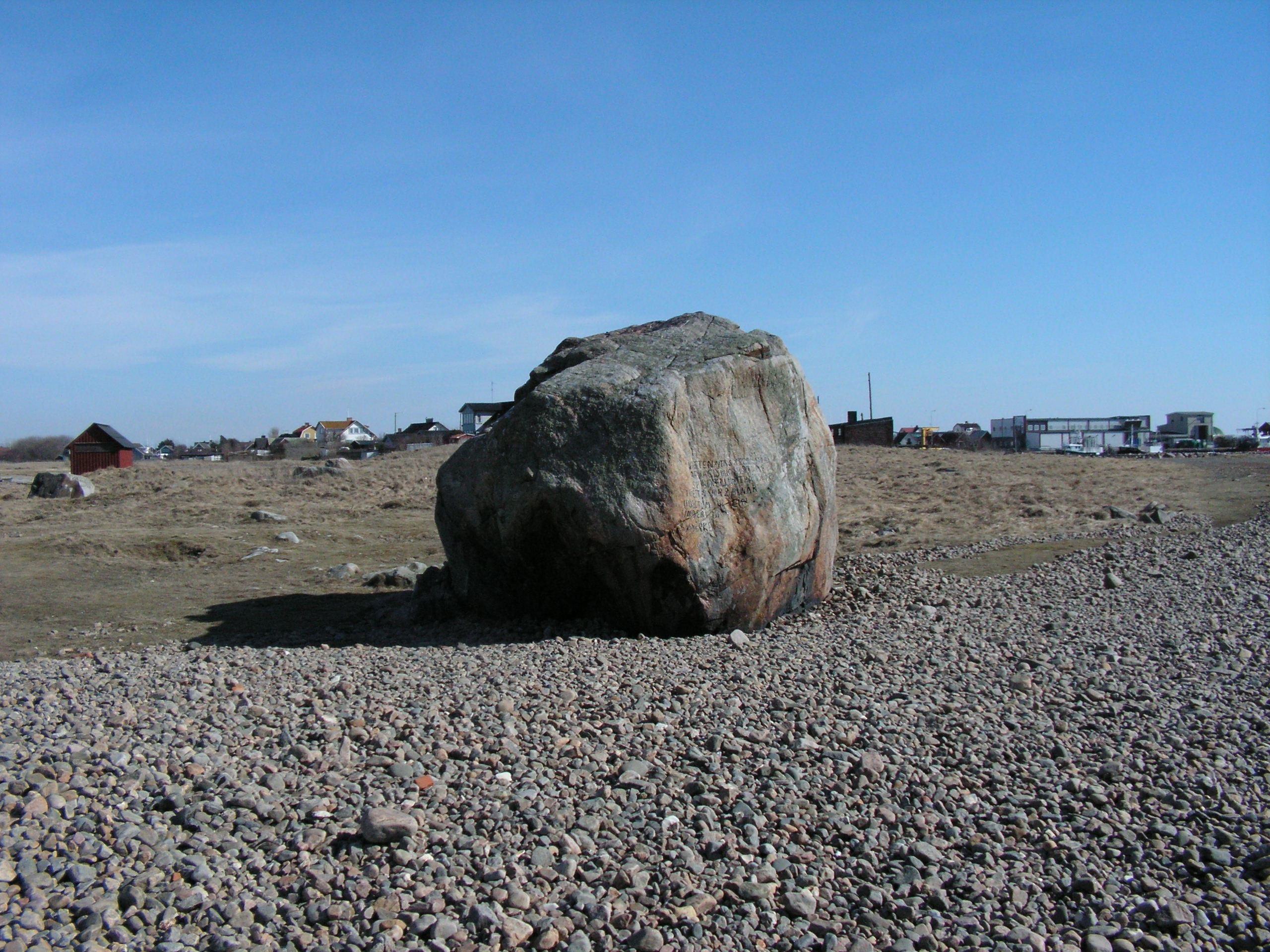
- The Glumsten, photo:Stefan Linder

- Location within Halland Location within Sweden
- Coordinates: 56°55′36″N 12°22′25″E
- Country: Sweden
- Province: Halland
- County: Halland County
- Municipality: Falkenberg Municipality

Area
  - Total: 0.77 km^{2} (0.30 sq mi)

Population (31 December 2010)
  - Total: 761
  - Density: 992/km^{2} (2,570/sq mi)
- Time zone: UTC+1 (CET)
  - Summer (DST): UTC+2 (CEST)

Glommen is a locality situated in Falkenberg Municipality, Halland County, Sweden, with 761 inhabitants in 2010.

It came to be formed in the later part of the 19th century, as a fishing port was established.

The Glumsten, a glacial erratic is mentioned as early as in the 11th century. It was important for navigation in the area until a lighthouse, Morups Tånge, was built in the 1840s. The stone has an engraved message of the sea level in September 1816th. The text was written by Sven Petter Bexell, vicar of Grimeton and Rolfstorp, and reads as follows: "Wattenytans medelhöjd afvägd år 1816 i September av S.P. Bexell. Rätt i väster härifrån var vattnet 2 alnar 11 decimal tum 4 ^{2}/_{3} linier under detta märke."

The largest company is Falkenberg Seafood with about 20 employees and a turnover of about 150 million SEK. The village is also home to two restaurants as well as two minkfarms. The football club, Glommens IF, has as best played in the fifth division.
