= Limmareds glasbruk =

Oldest running glassworks in Sweden

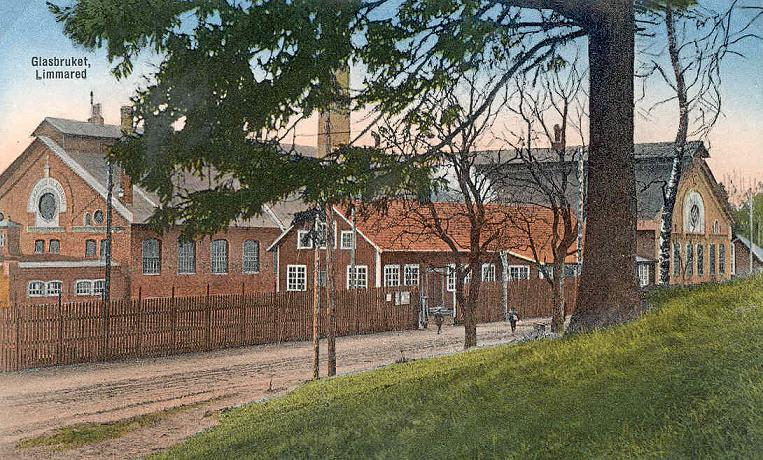
Limmareds glasbruk around 1920

Limmareds glasbruk, near Limmared, is Sweden's oldest still running glassworks. It was founded in 1740. Limmareds glasbruk is the manufacturer of the Absolut Vodka bottle.
