= Holsljunga =

- Location within Västra Götaland Location within Sweden
- Coordinates: 57°25′N 12°58′E
- Country: Sweden
- Province: Västergötland
- County: Västra Götaland County
- Municipality: Svenljunga Municipality

Area
  - Total: 0.35 km^{2} (0.14 sq mi)

Population (31 December 2010)
  - Total: 255
  - Density: 737/km^{2} (1,910/sq mi)
- Time zone: UTC+1 (CET)
  - Summer (DST): UTC+2 (CEST)

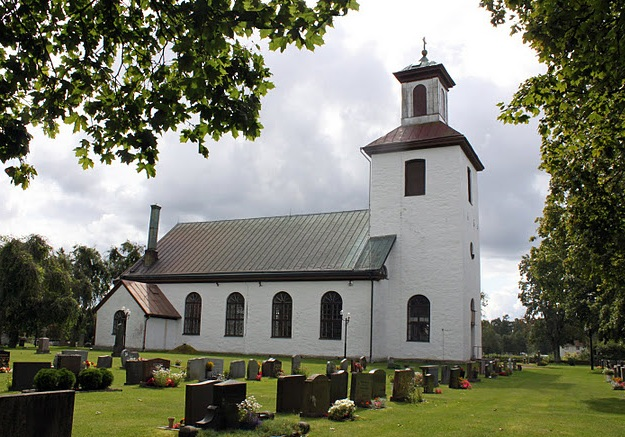
Holsljunga church

Holsljunga (Swedish pronunciation: [ˈhɔ̂lːˌɧɵŋːa]) is a locality situated in Svenljunga Municipality, Västra Götaland County, Sweden with 255 inhabitants in 2010.

== Sports ==
The following sports clubs are located in Holsljunga:

- Högvads BK

== Manufacturing ==
Sahlins Sweden AB develops, manufactures and sells products and methods for telecommunications network construction worldwide. The company was founded 1969.
