= Vinberg (surname) =

Vinberg is a surname. Notable people with the surname include:

- Ernest Borisovich Vinberg (1937–2020), Russian/Soviet mathematician
- Fyodor Viktorovich Vinberg (1868–1927), Russian Empire officer, publisher, and journalist
- Henry Vinberg, Swedish footballer
- Rachelle Vinberg, American skateboarder and actress
