= Ljungby, Falkenberg =

Former parish in Halland, Sweden

Coordinates: 56°59′N 12°35′E

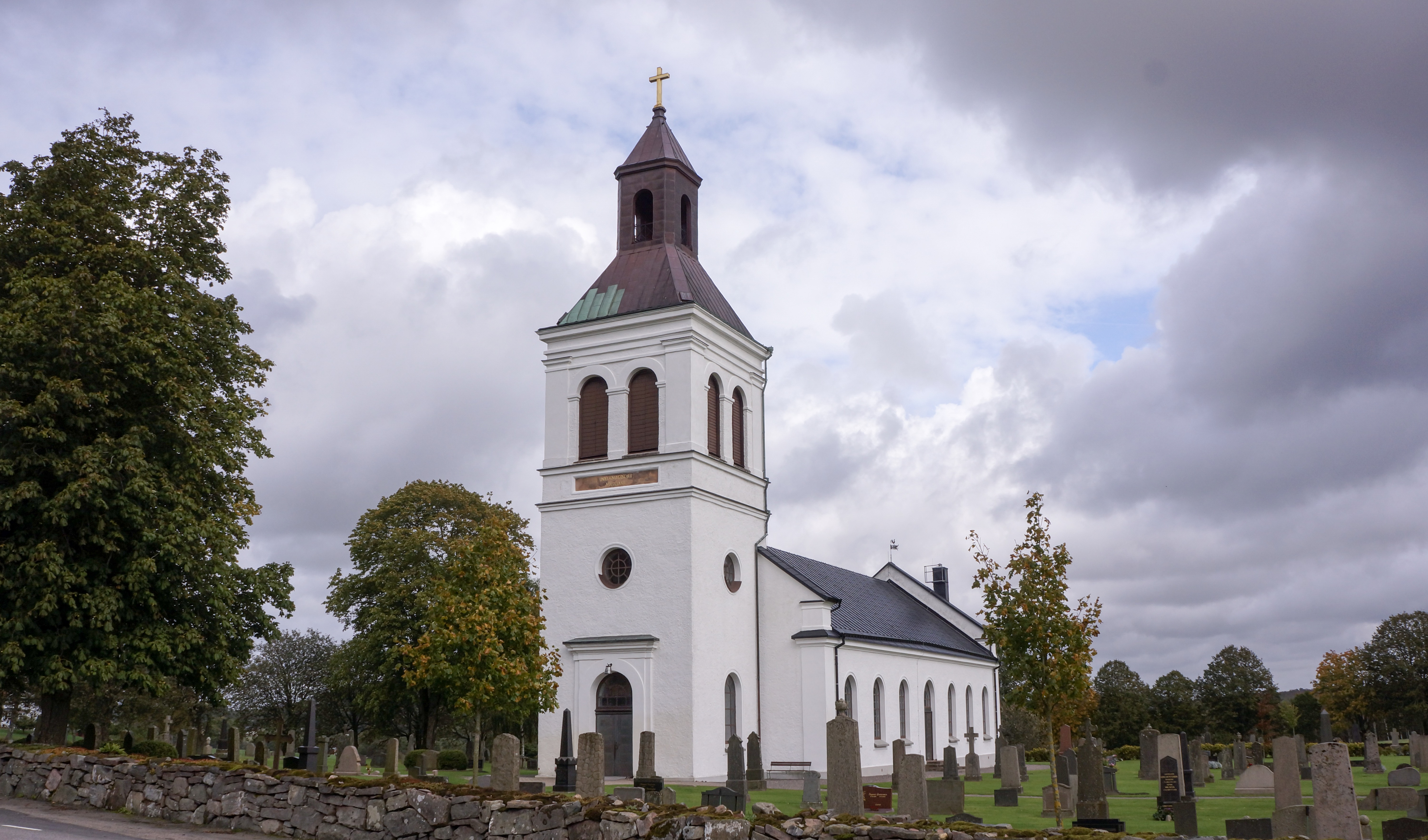
Ljungby church

Ljungby is a former parish in Falkenberg Municipality, Halland County, Sweden. The name is most likely derived from the conjunction of ljung (Calluna) and by (village). It is confirmed in written sources from at least 1267. Two conurbations exist within the parish borders; Ljungby/Lilla Ljungby and Bergagård. A minor part of Ätrafors is also within the parish boundary.

== Geography, geology and nature ==
The parish has an area of 54.37 km^{2}, of which 53.47 km^{2} are land. It is mainly situated on the Hallandian plain. Arable land covered, as of 1971, about 62 percent of the parish, while 26 percent was wooded. The river Ätran delimits it in the northeast, while a tributary river, Vinån, flows through the central part of the parish. The only lake of any size is Ljungsjön, situated in the central part of the parish.

The highest shore-line passes through the parish, resulting in varied ground conditions. An ice lake delta once covered the eastern parts of the parish, leading to deposits of gravel and sand, which are being exploited. Moraine eskers are found in the northern and eastern parts. A 120 centimeter long lower jawbone from an av baleen whale has been found in Tångaberg.

The highest peak is Horsakullen, 137 meters above sea-level. Other hills are Hellepjucken (130 m), Vasabjär and Hanapjutten.

Two types of Heath plants are closely associated with Ljungby: Calluna and Broom. Calluna was previously widespread in the area, but its appearance has diminished due to modern farming. It has given its name not only to the parish, but also to several lakes, hills and farms.

Ljungby was, as of 1971, the only place in Halland, and perhaps Sweden, where Genista germanica could be found. It was also the only place in Halland north of the river Ätran where Silkyleaf woadwaxen could be found.

== History ==
Several Bronze Age tumuli are found within the parish. A cemetery can be found in the wooded area west of Ljungsjön. The cemetery includes a tumulus with a diameter of 32 meters and a height of 2.5 meters, named Hästerör. Another cemetery can be found in the southern part of the parish. It covers an area of 70x190 meters and includes stone circles and stone ships.

Ljungby has had at least two churches. The old one caught fire in 1869 and was replaced with a new one at the same spot, inaugurated in 1875.

An inn was established in 1764. It was originally situated in Bergagård, but moved to Lilla Ljungby in the late 19th century and was closed down in the early 20th century.

Ljungby municipality (the secular equivalence of the parish) merged with Vinberg in 1952. The new municipality in turn merged with several other municipalities in 1970 to form the current Falkenberg Municipality.

== Infrastructure ==
County road 154 passes through the parish in a southwestern-northeastern direction. Falkenberg railway used to pass through Ljungby, but without having any station within the parish.

== See also ==
- Hellerup, Sweden
- Höstena springs

== Sources ==
- En bok om Ljungby, Kommittén för kulturforskning i Vinbergs kommun. 1971. Falkenberg: Hallands Nyheter AB (in Swedish)
- Falkenbergs grundskolor: Ljungbyskolan (in Swedish)
