= Magnus Svensson (footballer) =

Swedish footballer (born 1969)

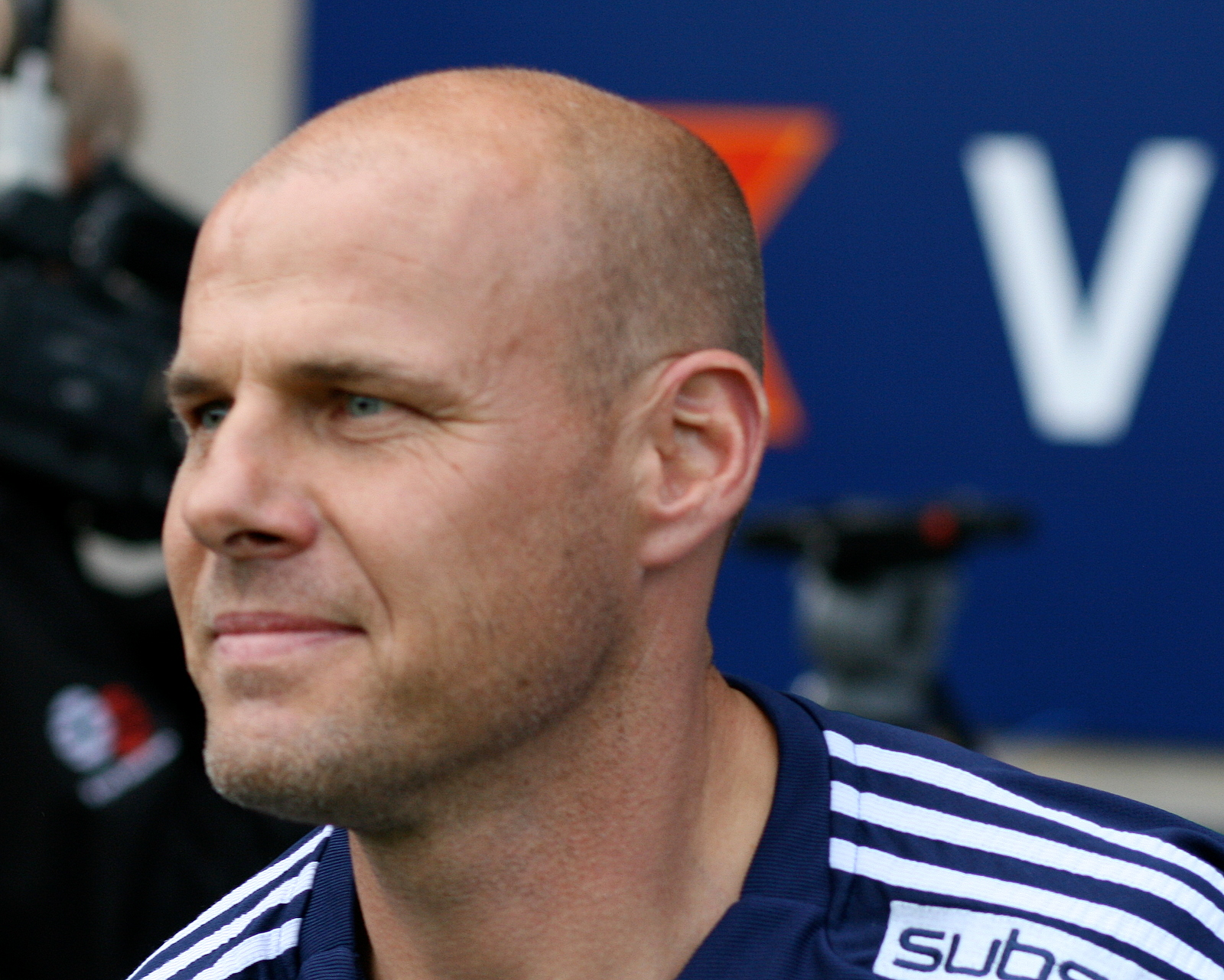
- Magnus Svendsson at Viking Stadion

Personal information
- Full name: Jan Tore Magnus Svensson
- Date of birth: 10 March 1969 (age 57)
- Place of birth: Vinberg, Sweden
- Height: 1.72 m (5 ft 8 in)
- Positions: Midfielder; right-back; right midfielder

Senior career*
Years	Team	Apps	(Gls)
1988–1993	Vinbergs IF	126	(11)
1994–1997	Halmstads BK	89	(6)
1998–1999	Viking	52	(7)
2000–2001	Brøndby IF	57	(1)
2002–2006	Halmstads BK	88	(1)
Total		412	(26)

International career
1996	Sweden B	1	(0)
1996–2003	Sweden	32	(2)

Managerial career
- 2009–: GIF Sundsvall (technical coach)
- * Club domestic league appearances and goals

Jan Tore Magnus "Turbo" Svensson (born 10 March 1969) is a Swedish former professional footballer who played as a midfielder. Beginning his career with Vinbergs IF in 1988, he went on to represent Halmstads BK, Viking, and Brøndby IF before retiring at Halmstad in 2006. A full international between 1996 and 2003, he won 32 caps and scored two goals for the Sweden national team. He represented Sweden at UEFA Euro 2000 and the 2002 FIFA World Cup.

== Club career ==
Svensson was born in Vinberg, Sweden. His career started in Vinbergs IF, but he soon joined Halmstads BK in the Swedish Allsvenskan championship. From 1998 to 2002 he moved abroad to play for Viking F.K. in Norway, where he was a big fan favourite. He became the most expensive player in the Danish Superliga when he was bought by Danish club Brøndby IF for NOK 12,5 million in spring 2000. He rejoined Halmstad in 2002.

2006 was Svensson's final year in Halmstad, and he moved back to Vinberg in 2007.

== International career ==
Svensson debuted for the Sweden national team in a friendly match against Japan on February 22, 1996. He scored his first international goal on February 12, 2001, in a friendly against China, after coming on as a substitute for Mattias Jonson in the second half of a 2–2 draw.

Svensson made his competitive debut for Sweden in a UEFA Euro 2000 qualifier against England, replacing Henrik Larsson in the 70th minute of a 0–0 draw. He played in three UEFA Euro 2000 qualifying matches as Sweden secured their place in the tournament. During UEFA Euro 2000, he participated in the group stage games against Turkey and Italy, although Sweden did not advance to the quarter-finals.

In the 2002 FIFA World Cup qualifiers, Svensson played in two matches, contributing to Sweden's first World Cup qualification since 1994. He featured in all four games for Sweden at the tournament, where the team reached the second round before being eliminated by Senegal via a golden goal.

Although he participated in two UEFA Euro 2004 qualifying matches, Svensson did not make the final tournament squad. His last international appearance was on June 11, 2003, in a UEFA Euro 2004 qualifier against Poland. Over his international career from 1996 to 2003, Svensson earned 32 caps and scored two goals for Sweden.

== Career statistics ==
=== International ===
Appearances and goals by national team and year
National team	Year	Apps	Goals
Sweden	1996	2	0
Sweden	1997	0	0
Sweden	1998	1	0
Sweden	1999	6	0
Sweden	2000	6	0
Sweden	2001	8	1
Sweden	2002	8	1
Sweden	2003	1	0
Total		32	2

Scores and results list Sweden's goal tally first, score column indicates score after each Svensson goal.

List of international goals scored by Magnus Svensson
No.	Date	Venue	Opponent	Score	Result	Competition	Ref.
1	12 February 2001	National Stadium, Bangkok, Thailand	China	1–2	2–2	Friendly	
2	13 February 2002	Kleanthis Vikelidis Stadium, Thessaloniki, Greece	Greece	1–0	2–2	Friendly	

== Honours ==
Halmstads BK

- Allsvenskan: 1997
- Svenska Cupen: 1994–95

Brøndby IF

- Danish Superliga: 2001–02

Individual

- Stor Grabb: 2001
