= Älvsered =

- Location within Halland Location within Sweden
- Coordinates: 57°14′N 12°52′E
- Country: Sweden
- Province: Västergötland
- County: Halland County
- Municipality: Falkenberg Municipality

Area
  - Total: 0.99 km^{2} (0.38 sq mi)

Population (31 December 2010)
  - Total: 433
  - Density: 440/km^{2} (1,100/sq mi)
- Time zone: UTC+1 (CET)
  - Summer (DST): UTC+2 (CEST)

Älvsered is a locality situated in Falkenberg Municipality, Halland County, Sweden, with 433 inhabitants in 2010.
