= Långås =

- Location within Halland Location within Sweden
- Coordinates: 56°58′38″N 12°26′51″E
- Country: Sweden
- Province: Halland
- County: Halland County
- Municipality: Falkenberg Municipality

Area
  - Total: 0.71 km^{2} (0.27 sq mi)

Population (31 December 2010)
  - Total: 534
  - Density: 747/km^{2} (1,930/sq mi)
- Time zone: UTC+1 (CET)
  - Summer (DST): UTC+2 (CEST)

Långås is a locality situated in Falkenberg Municipality, Halland County, Sweden, with 534 inhabitants in 2010. The footballer Patric Andersson is from the village.
