= Skogstorp, Falkenberg Municipality =

Skogstorp
- Location within Halland Location within Sweden
- Coordinates: 56°55′N 12°26′E
- Country: Sweden
- Province: Halland
- County: Halland County
- Municipality: Falkenberg Municipality

Area
  - Total: 1.39 km^{2} (0.54 sq mi)

Population (31 December 2010)
  - Total: 2,124
  - Density: 1,528/km^{2} (3,960/sq mi)
- Time zone: UTC+1 (CET)
  - Summer (DST): UTC+2 (CEST)

Skogstorp is a suburb of Falkenberg in Falkenberg Municipality, Halland County, Sweden. Until 2015 it was considered a separate locality, with 2,124 inhabitants in 2010.
