= Vinbergs kyrkby =

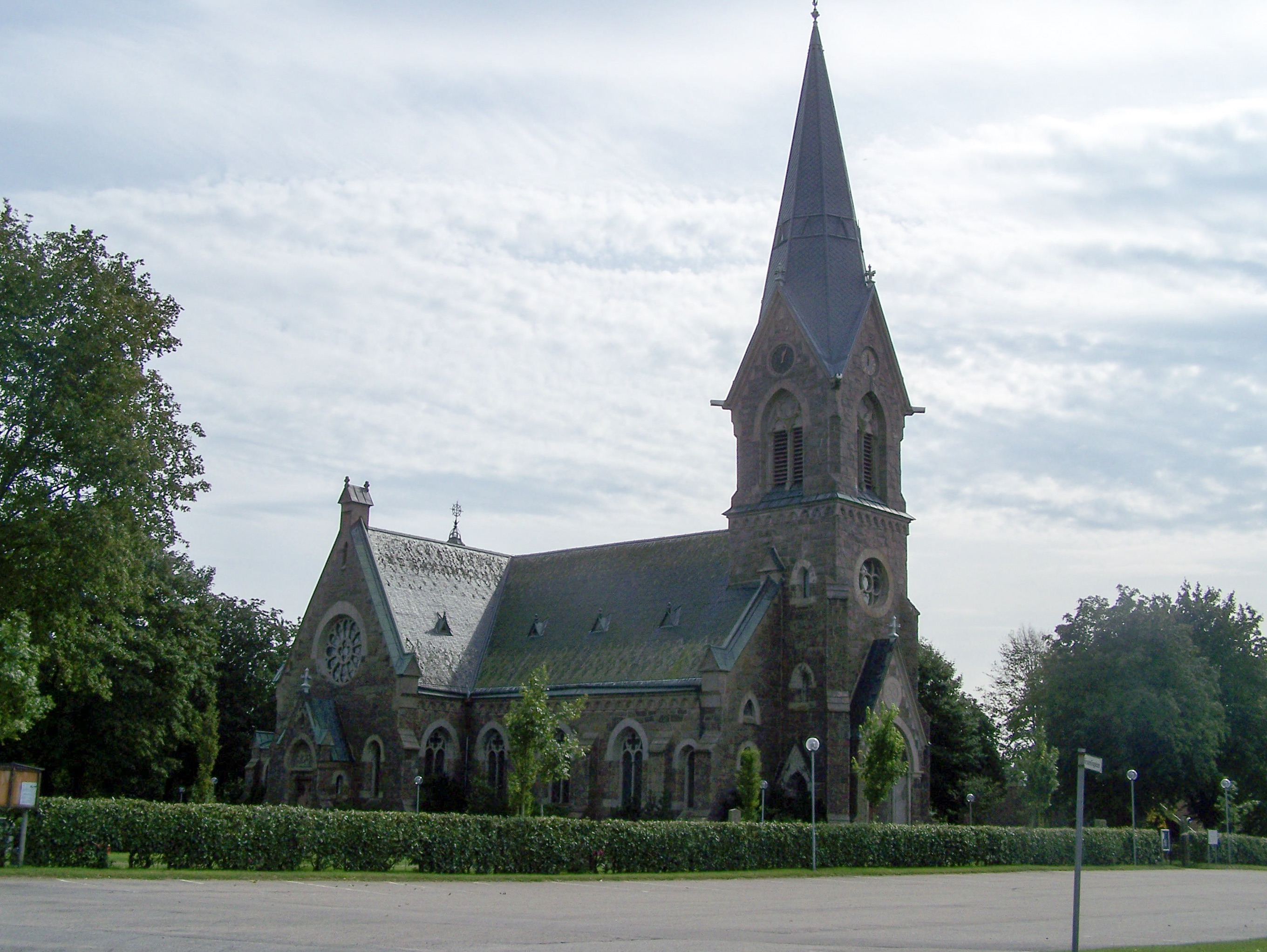
- Vinberg Church in August 2007

- Location within Halland Location within Sweden
- Coordinates: 56°56′N 12°33′E
- Country: Sweden
- Province: Halland
- County: Halland County
- Municipality: Falkenberg Municipality

Area
  - Total: 0.64 km^{2} (0.25 sq mi)

Population (31 December 2010)
  - Total: 208
  - Density: 324/km^{2} (840/sq mi)
- Time zone: UTC+1 (CET)
  - Summer (DST): UTC+2 (CEST)

Vinbergs kyrkby is a locality situated in Falkenberg Municipality, Halland County, Sweden, with 208 inhabitants in 2010.
