= Ätran (locality) =

- Location within Halland Location within Sweden
- Coordinates: 57°07′N 12°57′E
- Country: Sweden
- Province: Halland
- County: Halland County
- Municipality: Falkenberg Municipality

Area
  - Total: 0.68 km^{2} (0.26 sq mi)

Population (31 December 2010)
  - Total: 417
  - Density: 617/km^{2} (1,600/sq mi)
- Time zone: UTC+1 (CET)
  - Summer (DST): UTC+2 (CEST)

Ätran is a locality situated in Falkenberg Municipality, Halland County, Sweden, with 417 inhabitants in 2010.
