= Limmared =

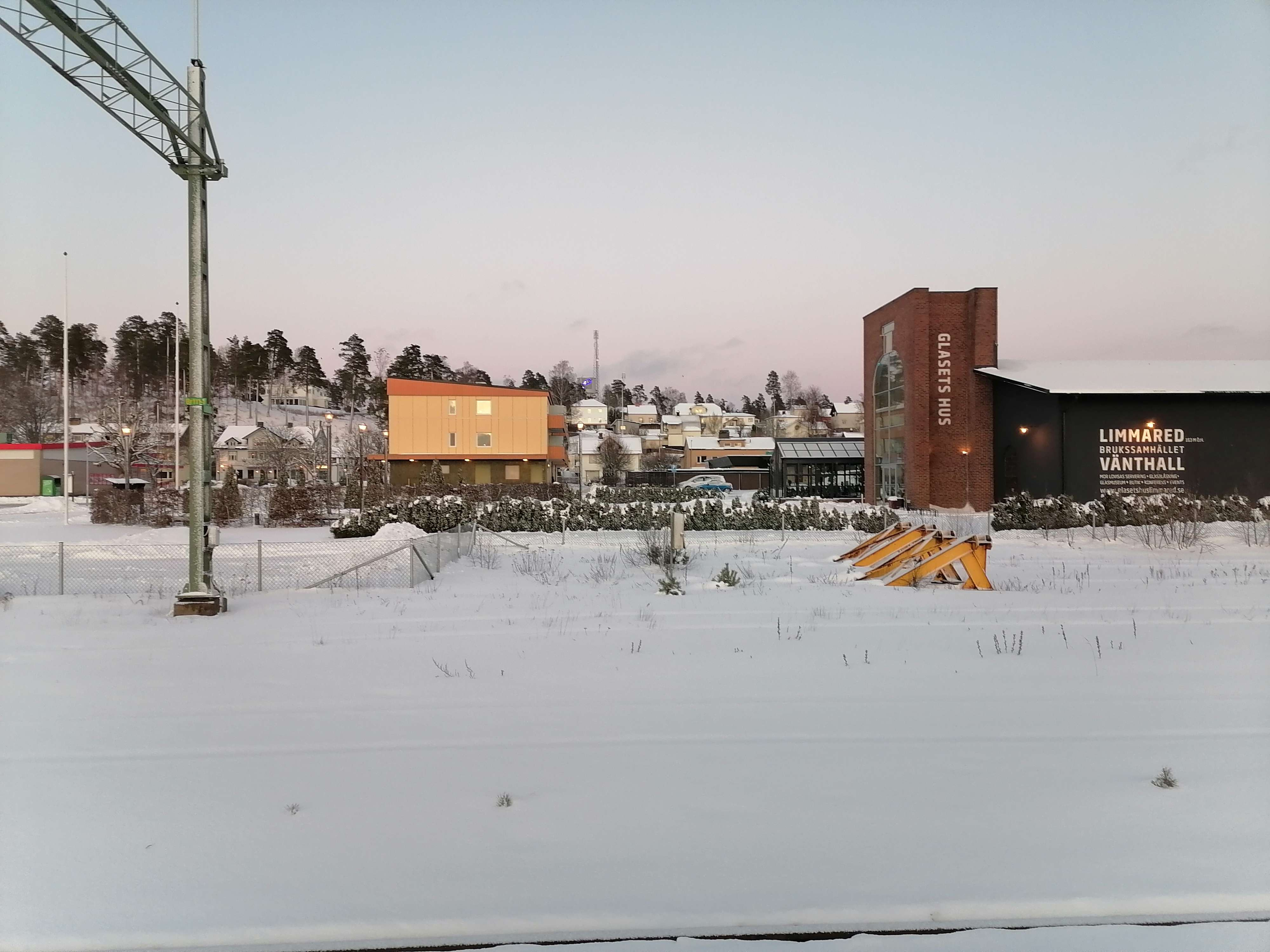
- A view of Limmared from March 11, 2023.

- Location within Västra Götaland Location within Sweden
- Coordinates: 57°32′N 13°21′E
- Country: Sweden
- Province: Västergötland
- County: Västra Götaland County
- Municipality: Tranemo Municipality

Area
  - Total: 1.46 km^{2} (0.56 sq mi)

Population (31 December 2010)
  - Total: 1,412
  - Density: 966/km^{2} (2,500/sq mi)
- Time zone: UTC+1 (CET)
  - Summer (DST): UTC+2 (CEST)
- Climate: Cfb

Limmared is a locality situated in Tranemo Municipality, Västra Götaland County, Sweden with 1,412 inhabitants in 2010.

== Points of interest ==
Limmareds glasbruk, Sweden's oldest functioning glassworks is located in Limmared. It was founded in 1740. Its most famous product is Absolute Vodka bottle.

The remains of Opensten, an old medieval fort, are located north to Limmared.

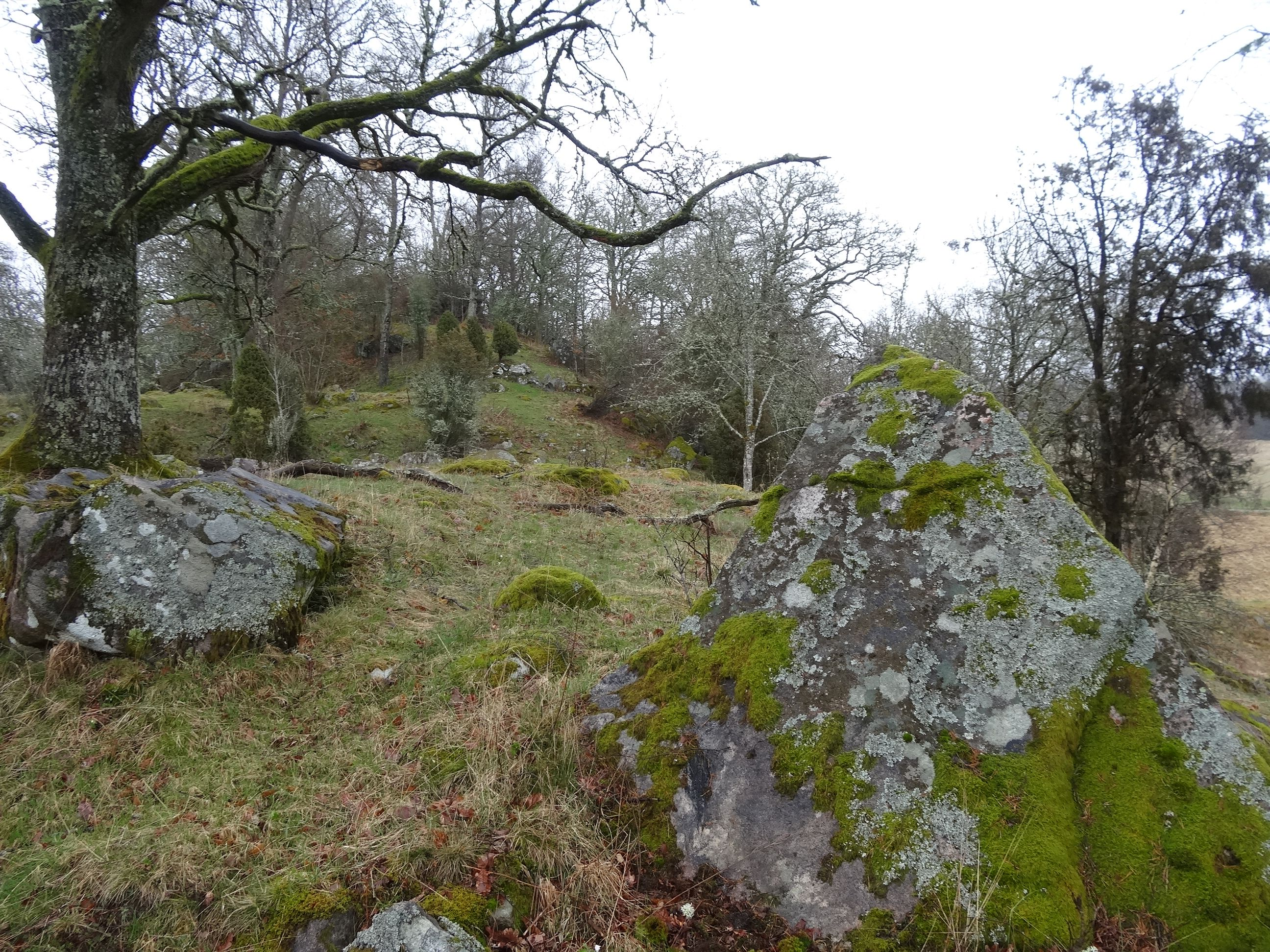
Remains in Opensten

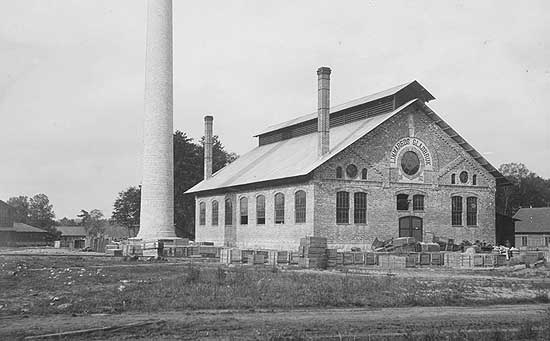
Limmareds glasbruk in 1903

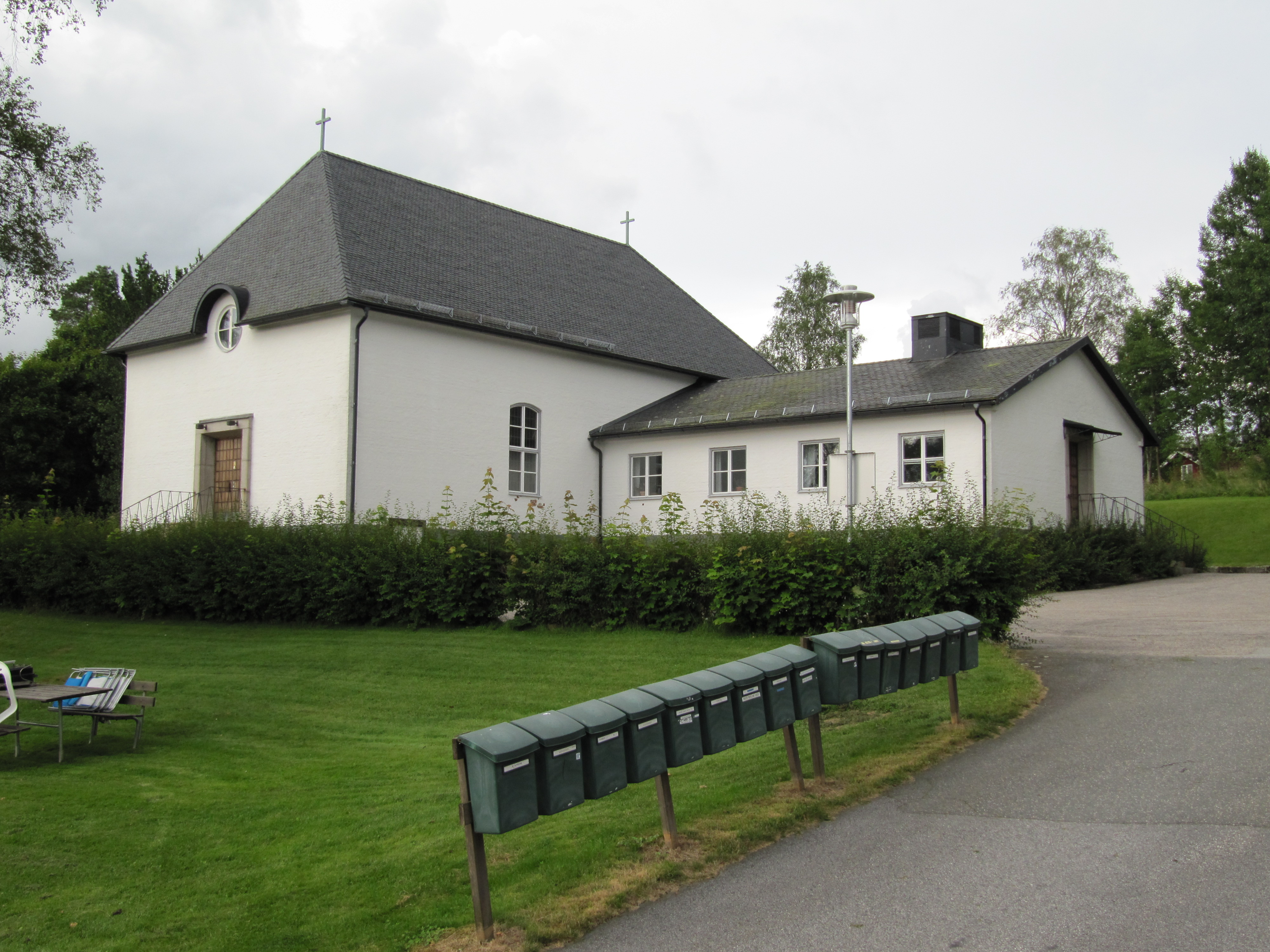
Limmareds kyrka
