= Gekås =

Superstore in Ullared, Sweden

Gekås Ullared AB
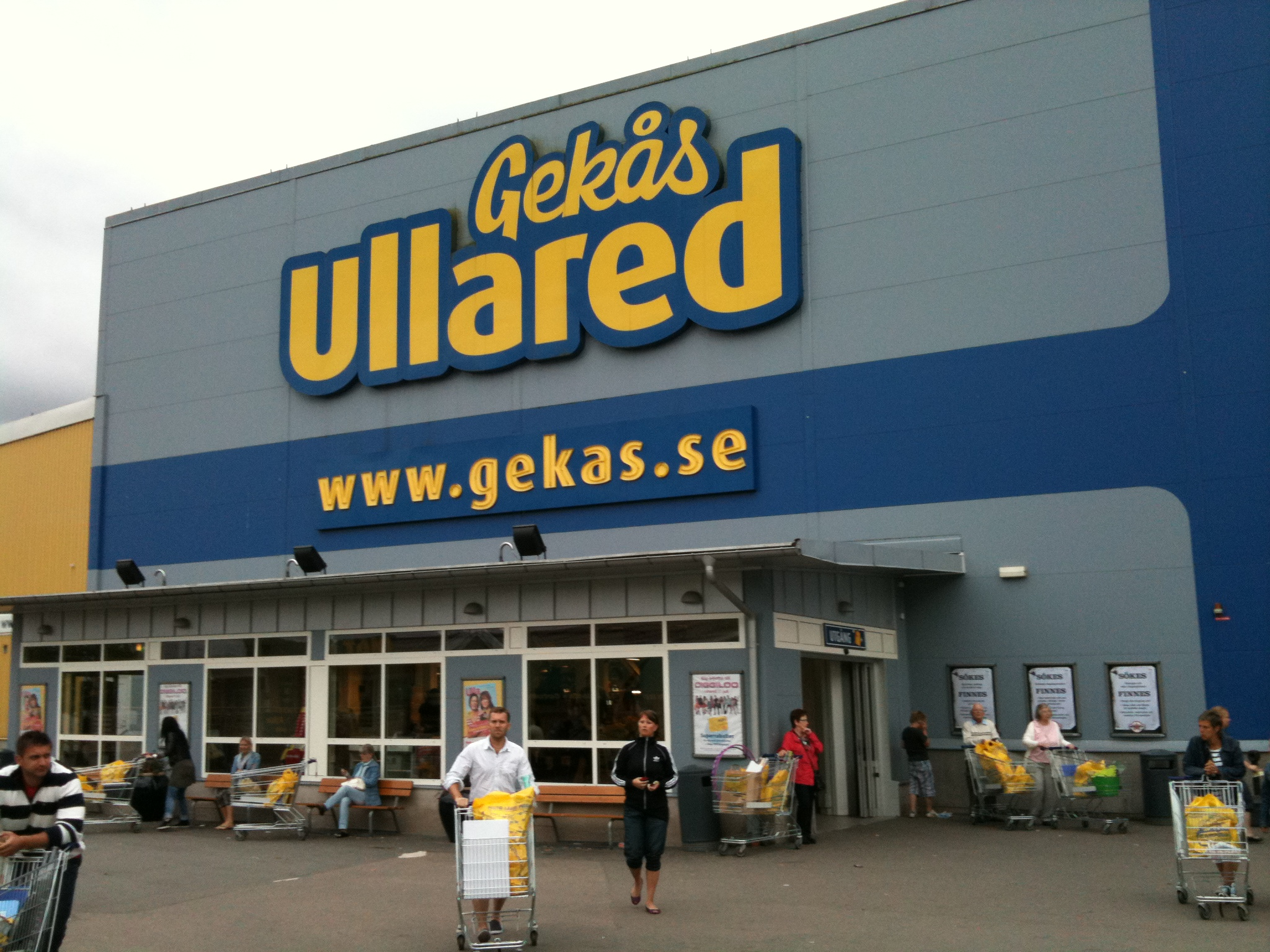
- Gekås, 2010
- Industry: Retail
- Founded: 1963 in Ullared, Sweden
- Founder: Göran Karlsson
- Headquarters: Ullared, Sweden
- Number of locations: 1 store (2017)
- Area served: Most of Sweden
- Key people: Patrik Levin; Chairman CEO
- Revenue: ▼4.055 billion SEK (2017)
- Operating income: ▼338.814 million SEK (2017)
- Net income: ▼262.586 million SEK (2017)
- Total assets: ▲2.925 billion SEK (2017)
- Total equity: ▲1.703 billion SEK (2017)
- Number of employees: 740 (2017)
- Parent: Gekås AB
- Subsidiaries: Gekås Ullared Restaurang AB; Gekåsbyn Ullared AB
- Website: gekas.se
- Footnotes / references Statistics from the 2017 financial statements

Gekås Ullared AB is a Swedish superstore in Ullared, Sweden, founded in 1963 by Göran Karlsson as Ge-kås Manufaktur. It had an annual turnover of SEK 4.2 billion in 2010, with a total store area of over 30,000 m^{2} (320,000 sq ft) in addition to a 50,000 m^{2} (540,000 sq ft) storage area just a few hundred yards away. In 2013, Malin Helde became CEO of the store, while Boris Lennerhov became CEO of the parent company. The store is visited annually by approximately 4.5 million customers, with the 2007 record of 26,200 for a single day, and the average customer travelling 150 km to get to the store. The store has recently opened a camping ground and a motel to accommodate long-distance travellers. It has been known for avoiding conventional advertising, instead relying on word of mouth. For three years starting in 2011, a reality television series, Ullared, was filmed in and around the store. It aired in both Norway and Sweden.

On 25 July 2011, the superstore was visited by record 29,500 customers during the day. The longest queue outside the superstore ever was recorded on 30 October 2010, when the queue was longer than 1.4 km. Through Gekås' website, potential customers can monitor the queue length. A barometer as measure indicates the length of the queue outside the building. Additionally, two web cameras give additional information about the situation at the entry. In 2011, over 122 million items passed the store's checkouts. The checkout has today about 60 cashiers. The department store's product range consists of over 100,000 items. The value of the goods available in the store is $4.9 million. A fully loaded truck delivers items every 10 minutes.

Gekås central warehouse has a size of 15000 square metres and holds about 10,000 pallets. Every 30 minutes all-year-round a new truck arrives. During peak season the entire store will be emptied in less than two business days.

== Facilities belonging to Gekås ==
Beyond the continuously expanded shopping center, Gekås operates Sweden's largest all-year-round campground. A lake for swimming with fountain is located in short walking distance from the campground and the huge parking lot.

The parking lot, with 3200 spaces, is considered Sweden's largest parking lot.

In recent years, Gekås has built a car museum (now closed and marketed as a convention center), a motel, and a business hotel. On the road towards Ätran on the outskirt of Ullared is a warehouse with additional parking and a dog kindergarten. Buses are run between the different locations for the transportation of shoppers.

The former museum showed Göran Karlsson's car collection, where a DeLorean as in the motion picture "Back to the Future" was used, was part of the collection.

== History ==
- 1963 – Store founded in Ullared by Göran Karlsson.
- 1967 – The store moves to a bigger building.
- 1971 – The store changes location again, to its current location.
- 1991 – Göran Karlsson sells the company to "six of his closest employees".
- 2003 – The market court forbids Göran Karlsson, who had started a competing business, from using the word "Ullared" in his marketing.

== Notes ==
- Ullared - byn som blev ett varumärke, Torsten Andersson. 2003. Falkenberg: Ge-kås Ullared AB. ISBN 91-631-3660-0
