= Falkenberg Municipality =

Falkenberg Municipality Falkenbergs kommun
- Municipality
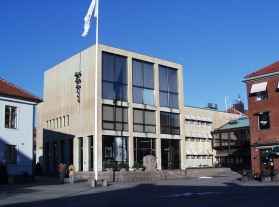
- Falkenberg Town Hall

- Coat of arms

- Coordinates: 56°55′N 12°30′E
- Country: Sweden
- County: Halland County
- Seat: Falkenberg

Area
  - Total: 1,825.72 km^{2} (704.91 sq mi)
  - Land: 1,108.89 km^{2} (428.14 sq mi)
  - Water: 716.83 km^{2} (276.77 sq mi)
- Area as of 1 January 2014.

Population (30 June 2025)
  - Total: 47,386
  - Density: 42.733/km^{2} (110.68/sq mi)
- Time zone: UTC+1 (CET)
  - Summer (DST): UTC+2 (CEST)
- ISO 3166 code: SE
- Province: Halland and Västergötland
- Municipal code: 1382
- Website: www.falkenberg.se

Falkenberg Municipality (Swedish: Falkenbergs kommun) is a municipality in Halland County on the Swedish west coast. The town Falkenberg is the municipal seat.

The municipality was created in 1971 when the City of Falkenberg was amalgamated with six rural municipalities (themselves formed by the 1952 local government reform) and part of a seventh. There are 24 original entities within the area.

Today, Falkenberg holds a strong position in the food and beverage industry with companies such as Arla Foods, Carlsberg and SIA Glass having plants in the city. In the inland Gekås, a major department store, draws visitors from all over the country. Falkenberg is also a tourist city, mainly for its many beaches.

== Economy ==
The main income for the Municipality is tourism from around Sweden, Germany, Denmark, Holland and Norway. The food industry is important. Here has Carlsberg Brewery a plant with 570 employees and Arla Foods who makes cheese has a factory with 400 employees. Other important workplaces is the Gekås shoppingcentre in Ullared which has more than 1,100 employees. The centre is a "Mecka" for low-price shoppers and the company earns more than 2 700 000 000 (340 500 000 US Dollars) kronor each year. The shoppingcentre in Wal-Mart style (almost without food)company has 3,800,000 visitors each year which makes it Sweden's most visited place.

== Demographics ==
This is a demographic table based on Falkenberg Municipality's electoral districts in the 2022 Swedish general election sourced from SVT's election platform, in turn taken from SCB official statistics.

In total there were 46,717 inhabitants, including 35,872 Swedish citizens of voting age. 47.7% voted for the left coalition and 51.3% for the right coalition. Indicators are in percentage points except population totals and income.

| Location | Residents | Citizen adults | Left vote | Right vote | Employed | Swedish parents | Foreign heritage | Income SEK | Degree |
| Location | | | % | % | | | | | |
|---|---|---|---|---|---|---|---|---|---|
| 1 V Gärdet-Hamnen | 1,855 | 1,524 | 50.0 | 49.1 | 78 | 78 | 22 | 24,103 | 31 |
| 2 Arvidstorp | 2,249 | 1,729 | 56.2 | 43.0 | 78 | 72 | 28 | 22,520 | 31 |
| 3 Herting | 2,184 | 1,634 | 51.8 | 46.6 | 78 | 69 | 31 | 25,125 | 35 |
| 4 V Gärdet-Smedjeholm | 1,963 | 1,512 | 51.6 | 46.6 | 81 | 75 | 25 | 23,479 | 31 |
| 5 Centrum | 1,798 | 1,645 | 49.8 | 49.4 | 80 | 77 | 23 | 22,586 | 32 |
| 6 Ö Gärdet-Vindlien | 2,103 | 1,646 | 57.0 | 42.6 | 84 | 73 | 27 | 27,270 | 34 |
| 7 N Skrea Strand | 1,485 | 1,224 | 38.7 | 60.9 | 85 | 85 | 15 | 28,104 | 42 |
| 8 Hjortsberg | 1,958 | 1,633 | 50.9 | 48.3 | 78 | 85 | 15 | 23,021 | 38 |
| 9 Tånga-Sloalyckan | 2,098 | 1,515 | 57.2 | 41.7 | 72 | 54 | 46 | 22,152 | 31 |
| 10 Falkagård-Stafsinge | 1,845 | 1,349 | 54.4 | 44.7 | 76 | 61 | 39 | 22,668 | 28 |
| 11 Slätten | 1,616 | 1,257 | 55.9 | 43.6 | 86 | 86 | 14 | 27,856 | 39 |
| 12 S Skrea-Strand | 1,771 | 1,314 | 38.3 | 61.1 | 87 | 91 | 9 | 31,562 | 51 |
| Glommen-Olofsbo | 1,878 | 1,602 | 44.4 | 54.6 | 85 | 92 | 8 | 25,745 | 38 |
| Köinge-Okome | 1,094 | 849 | 44.0 | 54.5 | 84 | 86 | 14 | 24,346 | 28 |
| Ljungby | 1,214 | 937 | 42.9 | 56.8 | 88 | 92 | 8 | 26,417 | 30 |
| Långås-Morup | 1,339 | 898 | 43.6 | 55.8 | 81 | 81 | 19 | 24,156 | 27 |
| Skogstorp | 2,287 | 1,663 | 52.4 | 46.4 | 82 | 72 | 28 | 25,295 | 31 |
| Skrea-Ringsegård | 2,120 | 1,587 | 45.6 | 53.3 | 89 | 92 | 8 | 29,961 | 50 |
| Slöinge | 1,371 | 985 | 48.2 | 50.3 | 80 | 80 | 20 | 22,584 | 29 |
| Tröingeberg | 2,398 | 1,730 | 49.2 | 49.8 | 88 | 83 | 17 | 28,257 | 36 |
| Ugglarp-Långasand | 1,127 | 952 | 44.3 | 54.7 | 85 | 93 | 7 | 27,270 | 48 |
| Ullared | 1,496 | 1,149 | 40.9 | 57.8 | 80 | 81 | 19 | 22,357 | 24 |
| Vessigebro | 1,666 | 1,239 | 47.9 | 50.9 | 83 | 87 | 13 | 24,829 | 32 |
| Vinbergs samhälle | 1,482 | 1,050 | 41.7 | 57.0 | 84 | 84 | 16 | 25,925 | 24 |
| Årstad | 1,703 | 1,257 | 39.0 | 60.1 | 84 | 85 | 15 | 25,060 | 32 |
| Älvsered | 1,339 | 1,026 | 35.4 | 63.5 | 82 | 85 | 15 | 21,436 | 21 |
| Ätran-Fegen | 1,278 | 966 | 39.4 | 59.2 | 81 | 86 | 14 | 22,145 | 24 |
Source: SVT

== Politics ==
The Right Party was the major party until 1931, when the Social Democratic Party gained that position. The municipality has, however, been a stronghold for the centre-right, whose parties have led the municipality thereafter, except for the period between 1994-1998 and 2018-. The current mayor is Per Svensson (Socialdemokratic Party) and the deputy mayor is Annelie Andelén (Centre).

Number of seats in the municipal assembly
| Party | 1998 | 2002 | 2006 | 2010 | 2014 | 2018 | 2022 |
|---|---|---|---|---|---|---|---|
| Moderata samlingspartiet | 8 | 7 | 9 | 11 | 9 | 9 | 11 |
| Centerpartiet | 12 | 10 | 12 | 11 | 10 | 10 | 10 |
| Liberalerna | 2 | 4 | 2 | 3 | 2 | 3 | 2 |
| Kristdemokraterna | 4 | 3 | 2 | 2 | 2 | 2 | 3 |
| Miljöpartiet de Gröna | 2 | 2 | 2 | 2 | 2 | 1 | 2 |
| Socialdemokraterna | 15 | 16 | 18 | 17 | 18 | 18 | 20 |
| Vänsterpartiet | 2 | 2 | 2 | 2 | 2 | 2 | 3 |
| Aktiv Politik | 3 | 4 | 2 | | | | |
| SPI | 3 | 3 | | | | | |
| Sverigedemokraterna | | | 2 | 3 | 6 | 6 | 10 |

== Localities ==
There are 17 urban areas (also called a tätort, or locality) in Falkenberg Municipality.

In the table the localities are listed according to the size of the population as of 31 December 2005. The municipal seat is in bold characters.

| # | Locality | Population |
|---|---|---|
| 1 | **Falkenberg** | 18,972 |
| 2 | Skogstorp | 2,180 |
| 3 | Slöinge | 974 |
| 4 | Ullared | 820 |
| 5 | Skrea | 789 |
| 6 | Vessigebro | 774 |
| 7 | Glommen | 687 |
| 8 | Vinberg | 598 |
| 9 | Långås | 516 |
| 10 | Älvsered | 475 |
| 11 | Heberg | 463 |
| 12 | Ätran | 400 |
| 13 | Ringsegård | 383 |
| 14 | Bergagård | 265 |
| 15 | Årstad | 258 |
| 16 | Morup | 248 |
| 17 | Vinbergs kyrkby | 216 |

== Parks ==
- Bengtesgård meadow, a nature reserve

== International relations ==
=== Twin towns — Sister cities ===
The municipality is twinned with:

- Borgarfjörður, Iceland
- Gniezno, Poland
- Leirvík, Faroe Islands
- Pieksämäki, Finland
- Ullensaker, Norway

== Notable natives ==
- Niclas Alexandersson (born 1971), football player
- Stellan Bengtsson (born 1952), former world champion, table tennis
- Per-Gunnar Andersson, race driver
- Lizzy DeVine, former lead singer of Vains Of Jenna
- J.P White, former bassist of Vains Of Jenna
- Nicki Kin, former guitarist of Vains Of Jenna
- Jacki Stone, former drummer Vains Of Jenna
- Ulla Smidje (1925–1972), Swedish actress
- Magnus Svensson (born 1969), football player
- Pär Zetterberg (born 1970), football player

== See also ==
- Hallands Nyheter
- Sport
  - Falkenbergs FF, association football
  - Falkenbergs VBK, volleyball
  - Falkenbergs BTK, table tennis
  - Falkenbergs Motorbana (motorsport racetrack)
