= List of hundreds of Sweden =

A hundred is a geographic division formerly used in northern Germanic countries and related colonies, which historically was used to divide a larger region into smaller administrative divisions. The equivalent term in Swedish is härad (in Uppland also known as hundare during the early Middle Ages); in Danish and Norwegian, herred; in Finnish, kihlakunta; and in Estonian, kihelkond. The Scanian hundreds were Danish until the Treaty of Roskilde of 1658.

Hundred	Province
Albo Hundred	Scania
Ale Hundred	Västergötland
Algutsrum Hundred	Öland
Allbo Hundred	Småland
Aska Hundred	Östergötland
Asker Hundred	Närke
Askim Hundred	Västergötland
Aspeland Hundred	Småland
Bankekind Hundred	Östergötland
Bara Hundred	Scania
Barne Hundred	Västergötland
Bjäre Hundred	Scania
Bjärke Hundred	Västergötland
Boberg Hundred	Östergötland
Bollebygd Hundred	Västergötland
Bro Hundred	Uppland
Bråbo Hundred	Östergötland
Bräkne Hundred	Blekinge
Bullaren Hundred	Bohuslän
Bälinge Hundred	Uppland
Daga Hundred	Södermanland
Dal Hundred	Östergötland
Eastern Hundred	Blekinge
Edsberg Hundred	Närke
Faurås Hundred	Halland
Fellingsbro Hundred	Västmanland
Finspång Fief Hundred	Östergötland
Fjäre Hundred	Halland
Flundre Hundred	Västergötland
Folkare Hundred	Dalarna
Frosta Hundred	Scania
Fryksdal Hundred	Värmland
Frökind Hundred	Västergötland
Frösåker Hundred	Uppland
Färentuna Hundred	Uppland
Färnebo Hundred	Värmland
Färs Hundred	Scania
Gillberg Hundred	Värmland
Glanshammar Hundred	Närke
Grimsten Hundred	Närke
Grums Hundred	Värmland
Gräsgård Hundred	Öland
Gudhem Hundred	Västergötland
Gullberg Hundred	Östergötland
Gärd Hundred	Scania
Gäsene Hundred	Västergötland
Göinge Eastern Hundred	Scania
Göinge Western Hundred	Scania
Göstring Hundred	Östergötland
Hagunda Hundred	Uppland
Halmstad Hundred	Halland
Hammarkind Hundred	Östergötland
Handbörd Hundred	Småland
Hanekind Hundred	Östergötland
Hardemo Hundred	Närke
Harjager Hundred	Scania
Herrestad Hundred	Scania
Himle Hundred	Halland
Hisingen Eastern Hundred	Västergötland
Hisingen Western Hundred	Bohuslän
Håbo Hundred	Uppland
Höks Hundred	Halland
Hölebo Hundred	Södermanland
Ingelstad Hundred	Scania
Inland Fräkne Hundred	Bohuslän
Inland Northern Hundred	Bohuslän
Inland Southern Hundred	Bohuslän
Inland Torpe Hundred	Bohuslän
Järrestad Hundred	Scania
Jönåker Hundred	Södermanland
Jösse Hundred	Värmland
Karlstad Hundred	Värmland
Kil Hundred	Värmland
Kind Hundred	Västergötland
Kinda Hundred	Östergötland
Kinne Hundred	Västergötland
Kinne Quarter Hundred	Västergötland
Kinnevald Hundred	Småland
Konga Hundred	Småland
Kulling Hundred	Västergötland
Kumla Hundred	Närke
Kville Hundred	Bohuslän
Kåkind Hundred	Västergötland
Kålland Hundred	Västergötland
Lagunda Hundred	Uppland
Lane Hundred	Bohuslän
Laske Hundred	Västergötland
Lister Hundred	Blekinge
Ljunit Hundred	Scania
Luggude Hundred	Scania
Ly Hundred	Uppland
Lysinge Hundred	Östergötland
Lång Hundred	Uppland
Mark Hundred	Västergötland
Medelstad Hundred	Blekinge
Memming Hundred	Östergötland
Mo Hundred	Småland
Möckleby Hundred	Öland
Möre Northern Hundred	Småland
Möre Southern Hundred	Småland
Nordal Hundred	Dalsland
Nordmark Hundred	Värmland
Norrbo Hundred	Västmanland
Norrvidinge Hundred	Småland
Norunda Hundred	Uppland
Nyed Hundred	Värmland
Närding Hundred	Uppland
Näs Hundred	Värmland
Oland Hundred	Uppland
Onsjö Hundred	Scania
Oppunda Hundred	Södermanland
Orust Eastern Hundred	Bohuslän
Orust Western Hundred	Bohuslän
Oxie Hundred	Scania
Rasbo Hundred	Uppland
Redväg Hundred	Västergötland
Runsten Hundred	Öland
Rönneberga Hundred	Scania
Rönö Hundred	Södermanland
Selebo Hundred	Södermanland
Seming Hundred	Uppland
Sevede Hundred	Småland
Siende Hundred	Västmanland
Simtuna Hundred	Uppland
Sju Hundred	Uppland
Skyllersta Hundred	Närke
Skytt Hundred	Scania
Skånings Hundred	Västergötland
Skärkind Hundred	Östergötland
Slättbo Hundred	Öland
Snevringe Hundred	Västmanland
Sollentuna Hundred	Uppland
Sotenäs Hundred	Bohuslän
Sotholm Hundred	Södermanland
Stranda Hundred	Småland
Stångenäs Hundred	Bohuslän
Sundal Hundred	Dalsland
Sundbo Hundred	Närke
Sunnerbo Hundred	Småland
Svartlösa Hundred	Södermanland
Sävedal Hundred	Västergötland
Sörbygden Hundred	Bohuslän
Tanum Hundred	Bohuslän
Tjust Northern Hundred	Småland
Tjust Southern Hundred	Småland
Tjörn Hundred	Bohuslän
Torna Hundred	Scania
Torstuna Hundred	Uppland
Trögd Hundred	Uppland
Tu Hundred	Västmanland
Tunalän Hundred	Småland
Tunge Hundred	Bohuslän
Tveta Hundred	Småland
Tönnersjö Hundred	Halland
Tössbo Hundred	Dalsland
Ulleråker Hundred	Uppland
Uppvidinge Hundred	Småland
Vadsbo Hundred	Västergötland
Vagnsbro Hundred	Västmanland
Vaksala Hundred	Uppland
Valbo Hundred	Dalsland
Valkebo Hundred	Östergötland
Valle Hundred	Västergötland
Vallentuna Hundred	Uppland
Vartofta Hundred	Västergötland
Vedbo Hundred	Dalsland
Vedbo Northern Hundred	Småland
Vedbo Southern Hundred	Småland
Veden Hundred	Västergötland
Vemmenhög Hundred	Scania
Vette Hundred	Bohuslän
Vifolka Hundred	Östergötland
Villand Hundred	Scania
Villåttinge Hundred	Södermanland
Vilske Hundred	Västergötland
Viske Hundred	Halland
Visnum Hundred	Värmland
Vista Hundred	Småland
Viste Hundred	Västergötland
Våla Hundred	Uppland
Väne Hundred	Västergötland
Väse Hundred	Värmland
Västbo Hundred	Småland
Västerrekarne Hundred	Södermanland
Vättle Hundred	Västergötland
Western Hundred	Småland
Ydre Hundred	Östergötland
Yttertjurbo Hundred	Västmanland
Åkerbo Hundred	Västmanland, Södermanland
Åkerbo Hundred	Öland
Åkerbo Hundred	Östergötland
Årstad Hundred	Halland
Ås Hundred	Västergötland
Åsbo Northern Hundred	Scania
Åsbo Southern Hundred	Scania
Åse Hundred	Västergötland
Åsunda Hundred	Uppland
Älvdal Hundred	Värmland
Ärling Hundred	Uppland
Öknebo Hundred	Södermanland
Ölme Hundred	Värmland
Örbyhus Hundred	Uppland
Örebro Hundred	Närke
Östbo Hundred	Småland
Österrekarne Hundred	Södermanland
Östkind Hundred	Östergötland
Övertjurbo Hundred	Västmanland
