= Results of the 1944 Swedish general election =

Sweden held a general election on 17 September 1944. Due to the wartime coalition government the bloc balance mainly determined that Per-Albin Hansson remained as Prime Minister, with the four-party coalition remaining in office with 215 out of 230 seats. Among the traditional blocs, the left bloc won 130 and the right bloc 100.

== Results ==
Party	Votes	%	Seats	+/–
Swedish Social Democratic Party	1,436,571	46.55	115	–19
National Organization of the Right	488,921	15.84	39	–3
Farmers' League	421,094	13.64	35	+7
People's Party	398,293	12.91	26	+3
Communist Party	318,466	10.32	15	+12
Radical National Association	6,775	0.22	0	New
Socialist Party	5,279	0.17	0	0
Swedish Socialist Unity	4,204	0.14	0	New
National League	3,819	0.12	0	New
Left Socialist Party	1,677	0.05	0	0
Other parties	1,205	0.04	0	0
Total	3,086,304	100.00	230	0
Valid votes	3,086,304	99.59		
Invalid/blank votes	12,799	0.41		
Total votes	3,099,103	100.00		
Registered voters/turnout	4,310,241	71.90		
Source: Nohlen & Stöver, SCB

== Regional results ==
=== Percentage share ===
Location	Share	Votes	S	H	B	FP	K	Other	Left	Right
Götaland	49.2	1,519,801	44.9	17.5	17.2	11.7	8.3	0.6	53.1	46.3
Svealand	35.1	1,083,159	48.1	15.5	8.6	14.8	11.8	1.3	59.9	38.9
Norrland	15.7	483,344	48.5	11.4	13.9	12.6	13.5	0.2	61.9	37.9
Total	100.0	3,086,304	46.6	15.8	13.6	12.9	10.3	0.7	56.9	42.4
Source: SCB

=== By votes ===
Location	Share	Votes	S	H	B	FP	K	Other	Left	Right
Götaland	49.2	1,519,801	681,676	265,755	260,712	177,664	125,577	8,417	807,253	704,131
Svealand	35.1	1,083,159	520,520	168,020	93,128	159,900	127,878	13,713	648,398	421,048
Norrland	15.7	483,344	234,375	55,146	67,254	60,729	65,011	829	299,386	183,129
Total	100.0	3,086,304	1,436,571	488,921	421,094	398,293	318,466	22,959	1,755,037	1,308,308
Source: SCB

== Constituency results ==
=== Percentage share ===
Location	Land	Share	Votes	S	H	B	FP	K	Other	Left	Right	Margin
Location		%		%	%	%	%	%	%	%	%	
Blekinge	G	2.0	62,346	47.1	15.9	13.3	14.6	8.8	0.3	55.9	43.8	7,523
Bohuslän	G	2.9	88,500	41.7	15.7	14.3	19.5	8.4	0.4	50.1	49.5	462
Gothenburg	G	4.8	146,756	39.9	17.8	0.0	14.9	24.3	3.1	64.1	32.7	46,043
Gotland	G	0.9	27,434	36.1	17.7	32.8	12.3	1.1	0.0	37.2	62.8	7,026
Gävleborg	N	3.9	121,569	51.7	8.3	14.2	10.8	14.9	0.1	66.5	33.3	40,352
Halland	G	2.3	72,405	38.1	16.7	34.4	4.9	5.8	0.1	43.9	56.0	8,749
Jämtland	N	1.9	58,172	49.8	13.3	18.9	10.5	7.5	0.0	57.2	42.8	8,428
Jönköping	G	4.0	122,475	38.7	11.7	20.1	22.4	7.0	0.1	45.6	54.3	10,651
Kalmar	G	3.4	106,125	43.6	19.5	25.2	5.1	6.6	0.0	50.3	49.7	571
Kopparberg	S	3.7	113,956	52.6	8.3	15.1	14.8	8.4	0.8	61.0	38.2	25,936
Kristianstad	G	3.7	114,145	45.4	14.5	22.2	13.0	4.1	0.8	49.5	49.7	287
Kronoberg	G	2.3	69,587	39.5	19.7	28.0	5.9	6.9	0.0	46.4	53.6	5,020
Malmö area	G	4.9	151,329	58.4	24.3	0.9	6.5	9.0	0.9	67.3	31.7	53,904
Malmöhus	G	4.3	133,140	52.9	12.3	23.6	8.6	2.4	0.2	55.3	44.5	14,357
Norrbotten	N	2.8	86,705	46.3	14.1	9.3	5.8	24.0	0.5	70.4	29.1	35,799
Skaraborg	G	3.5	109,199	35.9	19.5	23.3	15.3	5.9	0.1	41.7	58.2	18,035
Stockholm	S	11.0	339,558	41.1	24.1	0.0	15.6	15.9	3.3	57.0	39.7	58,550
Stockholm County	S	4.7	143,994	48.8	16.0	8.0	14.5	12.1	0.6	60.8	38.5	32,115
Södermanland	S	3.3	101,301	56.0	11.0	13.4	15.3	4.3	0.0	60.3	39.7	20,897
Uppsala	S	2.1	64,406	49.4	13.4	16.0	15.5	5.5	0.2	54.9	44.9	6,452
Värmland	S	4.1	125,734	48.9	11.0	12.8	12.9	14.1	0.3	63.0	36.7	32,984
Västerbotten	N	3.0	92,446	44.1	13.9	12.8	25.2	4.0	0.0	48.0	52.0	3,656
Västernorrland	N	4.0	124,452	49.6	9.8	15.4	10.5	14.5	0.2	64.1	35.7	35,334
Västmanland	S	2.7	83,858	53.6	9.6	14.3	12.2	10.3	0.0	63.9	36.1	23,351
Älvsborg N	G	2.6	80,768	41.3	14.1	22.1	15.4	7.1	0.0	48.5	51.5	2,466
Älvsborg S	G	2.4	73,755	40.8	26.8	17.4	8.4	6.4	0.2	47.2	52.6	4,011
Örebro	S	3.6	110,352	50.7	10.9	11.2	15.7	11.5	0.0	62.3	37.7	27,065
Östergötland	G	5.2	161,837	52.9	17.2	12.8	8.7	8.4	0.0	61.3	38.7	36,507
Total		100.0	3,086,304	46.6	15.8	13.6	12.9	10.3	0.7	56.9	42.4	446,729
Source: SCB

=== By votes ===
Location	Land	Share	Votes	S	H	B	FP	K	Other	Left	Right	Margin
Location		%										
Blekinge	G	2.0	62,346	29,348	9,895	8,301	9,120	5,491	191	34,839	27,316	7,523
Bohuslän	G	2.9	88,500	36,906	13,873	12,674	17,297	7,400	350	44,306	43,844	462
Gothenburg	G	4.8	146,756	58,429	26,127		21,939	35,680	4,581	94,109	48,066	46,043
Gotland	G	0.9	27,434	9,891	4,843	9,005	3,382	313		10,204	17,230	7,026
Gävleborg	N	3.9	121,569	62,816	10,092	17,258	13,188	18,074	141	80,890	40,538	40,352
Halland	G	2.3	72,405	27,600	12,108	24,896	3,514	4,169	118	31,769	40,518	8,749
Jämtland	N	1.9	58,172	28,953	7,757	11,011	6,102	4,345	4	33,298	24,870	8,428
Jönköping	G	4.0	122,475	47,224	14,372	24,664	27,458	8,619	138	55,843	66,494	10,651
Kalmar	G	3.4	106,125	46,354	20,692	26,691	5,388	6,988	12	53,342	52,771	571
Kopparberg	S	3.7	113,956	59,933	9,449	17,219	16,872	9,543	940	69,476	43,540	25,936
Kristianstad	G	3.7	114,145	51,726	16,600	25,329	14,818	4,734	938	56,460	56,747	287
Kronoberg	G	2.3	69,587	27,453	13,690	19,496	4,113	4,826	9	32,279	37,299	5,020
Malmö area	G	4.9	151,329	88,208	36,791	1,431	9,774	13,692	1,433	101,900	47,996	53,904
Malmöhus	G	4.3	133,140	70,416	16,409	31,438	11,396	3,184	297	73,600	59,243	14,357
Norrbotten	N	2.8	86,705	40,234	12,204	8,024	5,000	20,793	450	61,027	25,228	35,799
Skaraborg	G	3.5	109,199	39,073	21,371	25,473	16,697	6,433	152	45,506	63,541	18,035
Stockholm (city)	S	11.0	339,558	139,433	81,964		52,873	53,954	11,334	193,387	134,837	58,550
Stockholm County	S	4.7	143,994	70,158	23,020	11,576	20,886	17,439	915	87,597	55,482	32,115
Södermanland	S	3.3	101,301	56,696	11,098	13,567	15,535	4,401	4	61,097	40,200	20,897
Uppsala	S	2.1	64,406	31,791	8,627	10,324	9,962	3,574	128	35,365	28,913	6,452
Värmland	S	4.1	125,734	61,485	13,797	16,122	16,268	17,686	376	79,171	46,187	32,984
Västerbotten	N	3.0	92,446	40,666	12,858	11,850	23,340	3,726	6	44,392	48,048	3,656
Västernorrland	N	4.0	124,452	61,706	12,235	19,111	13,099	18,073	228	79,779	44,445	35,334
Västmanland	S	2.7	83,858	44,991	8,035	12,009	10,205	8,609	9	53,600	30,249	23,351
Älvsborg N	G	2.6	80,768	33,377	11,357	17,851	12,406	5,771	6	39,148	41,614	2,466
Älvsborg S	G	2.4	73,755	30,072	19,757	12,820	6,225	4,719	162	34,791	38,802	4,011
Örebro	S	3.6	110,352	56,033	12,030	12,311	17,299	12,672	7	68,705	41,640	27,065
Östergötland	G	5.2	161,837	85,599	27,870	20,643	14,137	13,558	30	99,157	62,650	36,507
Total		100.0	3,086,304	1,436,571	488,921	421,094	398,293	318,466	22,959	1,755,037	1,308,308	446,729
Source: SCB

== Results by city and district ==
=== Blekinge ===
Location	Share	Votes	S	AV	B	FP	K	Left	Right
Bräkne	12.6	7,859	49.3	11.7	23.5	7.1	8.2	57.5	42.3
Karlshamn	7.4	4,608	47.0	26.2	1.2	15.6	9.4	56.4	43.0
Karlskrona	20.2	12,622	48.7	21.2	0.4	19.9	9.6	58.3	41.5
Lister	17.8	11,081	42.8	14.4	16.4	16.5	9.3	52.2	47.3
Medelstad	19.0	11,829	48.2	10.5	22.4	9.3	9.3	57.4	42.2
Ronneby	4.4	2,743	57.0	19.4	1.1	12.8	9.7	66.6	33.3
Sölvesborg	3.1	1,950	45.7	22.0	0.6	19.3	11.6	57.3	41.9
Östra	13.6	8,488	45.3	10.9	20.8	17.2	5.7	51.0	48.9
Postal vote	1.9	1,166							
Total	2.0	62,346	47.1	15.9	13.3	14.6	8.8	55.9	43.8
Source: SCB

=== Gothenburg and Bohuslän ===
==== Bohuslän ====
Location	Share	Votes	S	AV	B	FP	K	Left	Right
Askim	11.0	9,700	39.0	17.8	7.7	23.6	11.7	50.7	49.1
Bullaren	1.0	861	15.4	11.7	43.4	25.3	4.1	19.5	80.5
Inlands Fräkne	2.2	1,922	31.1	21.9	24.0	22.1	0.7	31.8	68.0
Inlands Nordre	4.2	3,752	26.8	26.3	30.6	14.8	0.8	27.6	71.7
Inlands Södre	3.3	2,916	27.2	17.5	37.2	11.5	3.7	30.9	66.2
Inlands Torpe	1.9	1,650	53.0	7.8	28.6	6.4	3.9	56.9	42.8
Kungälv	1.9	1,692	53.2	18.0	1.0	15.9	11.4	64.6	34.9
Kville	2.5	2,191	33.7	9.8	31.0	23.8	1.5	35.2	64.6
Lane	3.0	2,678	28.5	12.1	34.4	23.3	1.1	29.6	69.7
Lysekil	3.2	2,835	57.5	22.3	0.1	9.5	10.5	67.9	31.9
Marstrand	0.6	512	36.3	17.0	0.0	33.6	13.1	49.4	50.6
Mölndal	9.1	8,090	46.8	7.2	2.4	11.0	32.5	79.3	20.7
Orust Västra	4.2	3,673	36.3	22.6	14.4	24.9	1.6	37.8	61.9
Orust Östra	2.1	1,842	36.0	12.0	33.4	18.3	0.2	36.2	63.7
Sotenäs	4.9	4,360	51.1	12.1	5.1	25.4	6.1	57.2	42.6
Strömstad	1.5	1,302	53.1	30.0	0.2	13.3	3.3	56.5	43.5
Stångenäs	3.9	3,493	56.8	19.6	8.7	13.0	1.6	58.4	41.3
Sävedal	6.6	5,821	44.0	12.0	8.4	17.2	18.1	62.1	37.6
Sörbygden	1.4	1,202	12.5	31.9	34.9	20.7	0.0	12.5	87.5
Tanum	3.0	2,651	34.6	20.8	25.1	18.1	0.8	35.4	64.1
Tjörn	3.0	2,620	18.8	13.6	13.0	53.7	0.8	19.6	80.3
Tunge	4.0	3,522	50.5	12.2	13.9	17.4	5.7	56.2	43.5
Uddevalla	9.3	8,196	59.0	15.2	0.5	20.2	4.6	63.6	35.8
Vette	3.7	3,290	49.5	6.2	30.8	11.3	2.1	51.6	48.3
Västra Hising	6.8	6,017	30.8	15.5	19.3	26.1	7.8	38.5	60.9
Östra Hising	0.6	529	30.8	10.6	39.1	8.9	9.8	40.6	58.6
Postal vote	1.3	1,183							
Total	2.9	88,500	41.7	15.7	14.3	19.5	8.4	50.1	49.5
Source: SCB

==== Gothenburg ====
Location	Share	Votes	S	AV	FP	K	Left	Right
Gothenburg	100.0	146,756	39.9	17.8	14.9	24.3	64.1	32.7
Total	4.8	146,756	39.9	17.8	14.9	24.3	64.1	32.7
Source: SCB

=== Gotland ===
Location	Share	Votes	S	AV	B	FP	K	Left	Right
Gotland Norra	39.2	10,750	38.5	13.2	38.6	8.2	1.5	39.9	60.1
Gotland Södra	37.7	10,335	24.5	11.0	44.9	19.3	0.4	24.8	75.2
Visby	21.8	5,976	52.4	35.2	2.9	7.7	1.8	54.2	45.8
Postal vote	1.4	373							
Total	0.9	27,434	36.1	17.7	32.8	12.3	1.1	37.2	62.8
Source: SCB

=== Gävleborg ===
Location	Share	Votes	S	AV	B	FP	K	Left	Right
Ala	9.3	11,328	56.5	3.1	17.9	5.8	16.7	73.2	26.7
Bergsjö-Forsa	8.9	10,813	40.3	3.2	30.5	11.3	14.5	54.8	45.0
Bollnäs	1.9	2,367	56.1	14.5	2.5	17.5	9.2	65.3	34.6
Bollnäs ting	10.7	12,999	50.2	4.0	21.4	11.9	12.3	62.5	37.4
Delsbo	3.3	4,042	39.9	5.2	43.4	4.8	6.3	46.2	53.5
Enånger	2.8	3,379	42.8	3.3	17.6	7.9	28.3	71.1	28.9
Gästrikland Västra	12.2	14,822	51.6	6.7	15.6	8.3	17.7	69.3	30.6
Gästrikland Östra	9.5	11,561	52.0	5.2	14.9	13.0	14.9	66.9	33.0
Gävle	14.6	17,692	58.4	17.7	0.5	15.2	8.1	66.5	33.4
Hudiksvall	2.7	3,270	40.5	19.8	1.7	16.4	21.3	61.8	37.9
Sandviken	7.6	9,199	66.2	7.0	0.3	8.8	17.6	83.9	16.1
Söderhamn	3.7	4,482	53.4	15.5	0.5	9.3	21.0	74.4	25.2
Västra Hälsingland	11.1	13,449	47.3	7.8	17.9	9.8	17.0	64.3	35.6
Postal vote	1.8	2,166							
Total	3.9	121,569	51.7	8.3	14.2	10.8	14.9	65.2	32.0
Source: SCB

=== Halland ===
Location	Share	Votes	S	AV	B	FP	K	Left	Right
Falkenberg	4.8	3,441	57.3	23.4	6.4	8.0	4.7	62.0	37.8
Faurås	9.4	6,827	24.8	12.3	59.8	2.1	1.0	25.7	74.2
Fjäre	10.5	7,594	28.6	15.0	52.0	3.0	1.3	29.9	70.0
Halmstad	18.9	13,699	52.7	21.3	1.7	7.9	16.4	69.1	30.9
Halmstad hundred	10.0	7,232	45.9	16.1	32.0	1.6	4.5	50.3	49.7
Himle	7.0	5,039	21.0	13.9	58.1	4.8	2.0	23.1	76.9
Hök	11.5	8,354	28.8	7.1	61.4	1.7	0.8	29.5	70.3
Kungsbacka	1.6	1,124	35.8	44.0	5.1	10.9	4.3	40.0	60.0
Laholm	1.7	1,241	47.9	22.8	19.7	6.9	2.6	50.5	49.5
Tönnersjö	6.8	4,898	40.7	9.5	40.5	2.2	7.2	47.9	52.1
Varberg	7.1	5,152	50.9	20.8	2.1	14.1	11.4	62.3	37.0
Viske	3.1	2,248	17.3	15.7	62.0	4.4	0.6	17.9	82.1
Årstad	6.4	4,602	32.4	18.9	46.3	1.0	0.8	33.2	66.2
Postal vote	1.3	954							
Total	2.3	72,405	38.1	16.7	34.4	4.9	5.8	43.9	56.0
Source: SCB

=== Jämtland ===
Location	Share	Votes	S	AV	B	FP	K	Left	Right
Berg	4.9	2,859	43.4	8.9	29.5	8.3	10.0	53.4	46.6
Hede	3.0	1,746	54.6	8.2	9.0	15.3	12.9	67.5	32.5
Hammerdal	11.8	6,856	54.1	12.6	19.7	7.8	5.8	59.9	40.1
Jämtland Västra	20.6	11,965	43.3	11.8	24.1	15.1	5.7	49.0	51.0
Lits-Rödön	13.5	7,852	46.2	10.5	26.7	11.5	5.2	51.4	48.6
Ragunda	12.1	7,022	61.8	8.1	17.3	5.6	7.2	69.0	31.0
Revsund-Brunflo-Näs	13.0	7,541	54.0	9.8	23.9	7.5	4.8	58.8	41.2
Sveg	6.1	3,555	54.0	7.1	9.7	8.2	21.1	75.0	25.0
Östersund	12.7	7,416	45.5	30.8	2.7	12.9	8.1	53.6	46.4
Postal vote	2.3	1,360							
Total	1.9	58,172	49.8	13.3	18.9	10.5	7.5	57.2	42.8
Source: SCB

=== Jönköping ===
Location	Share	Votes	S	AV	B	FP	K	Left	Right
Eksjö	2.8	3,454	45.7	22.5	2.2	26.4	2.8	48.5	51.1
Gränna	0.5	607	32.1	25.0	1.3	35.9	5.6	37.7	62.3
Huskvarna	4.5	5,514	56.2	6.6	0.3	20.0	16.9	73.1	26.8
Jönköping	14.6	17,876	45.6	17.6	1.1	22.7	12.7	58.3	41.5
Mo	2.5	3,028	18.4	7.2	35.7	37.9	0.8	19.2	80.8
Norra Vedbo	5.3	6,432	29.8	14.1	24.9	28.1	3.0	32.8	67.1
Nässjö	4.5	5,471	53.9	14.8	1.7	19.9	9.4	63.3	36.4
Södra Vedbo	5.6	6,917	35.4	7.7	32.3	20.4	4.1	39.5	60.4
Tranås	3.0	3,723	50.3	14.3	1.2	27.1	7.0	57.3	42.6
Tveta	9.4	11,468	47.5	6.0	17.2	22.8	6.3	53.8	46.0
Vetlanda	1.8	2,206	40.8	22.1	1.9	22.1	12.8	53.6	46.1
Vista	2.3	2,858	21.9	6.9	34.1	34.0	3.0	24.9	75.1
Värnamo	2.5	3,081	47.8	20.2	1.4	19.0	11.6	59.4	40.6
Västbo	13.5	16,527	35.4	9.0	37.3	13.4	4.9	40.3	59.7
Västra	9.6	11,796	26.6	8.0	37.8	23.4	4.1	30.6	69.2
Östbo	7.8	9,602	31.8	12.6	23.5	26.6	5.4	37.2	62.8
Östra	7.7	9,440	33.4	7.1	33.5	19.9	6.2	39.5	60.4
Postal vote	2.0	2,475							
Total	4.0	122,475	38.7	11.7	20.1	22.4	7.0	45.6	54.3
Source: SCB

=== Kalmar ===
Location	Share	Votes	S	AV	B	FP	K	Left	Right
Algutsrum	2.4	2,525	37.1	25.0	31.0	1.0	5.9	43.0	57.0
Aspeland	6.6	6,972	46.1	14.7	27.0	9.1	3.1	49.2	50.8
Borgholm	0.9	951	46.7	24.2	6.1	16.6	6.4	53.1	46.9
Gräsgård	1.7	1,836	51.7	18.0	25.0	1.9	3.4	55.1	44.8
Handbörd	6.0	6,373	42.9	16.9	26.6	5.9	7.7	50.6	49.3
Kalmar	10.3	10,897	50.0	30.0	1.2	6.6	12.3	62.3	37.7
Möckleby	1.1	1,176	12.6	24.3	61.8	0.7	0.6	13.2	86.8
Norra Möre	4.7	5,035	46.0	21.4	29.0	1.1	2.5	48.5	51.5
Norra Tjust	7.1	7,525	51.5	14.3	29.0	2.6	2.7	54.1	45.9
Nybro	2.8	2,947	55.6	23.5	1.8	4.8	14.4	69.9	30.1
Oskarshamn	4.3	4,549	57.3	20.3	0.5	8.2	13.7	71.0	29.0
Runsten	1.5	1,615	13.9	12.0	73.1	0.4	0.6	14.5	85.5
Sevede	6.8	7,241	34.3	16.0	40.6	5.4	3.7	38.0	62.0
Slättbo	1.2	1,282	25.2	11.6	58.0	1.4	3.8	29.0	71.0
Stranda	5.6	5,944	43.9	17.4	19.6	5.4	13.8	57.7	42.3
Södra Möre	13.7	14,506	38.8	19.2	34.8	2.9	4.3	43.1	56.9
Södra Tjust	8.4	8,948	49.0	12.8	28.2	3.7	6.4	55.4	44.6
Tunalän	4.5	4,750	39.6	19.6	32.3	5.9	2.6	42.2	57.8
Vimmerby	1.7	1,846	50.3	28.1	8.9	11.0	1.8	52.1	47.9
Västervik	4.6	4,884	46.5	28.8	1.6	9.8	13.2	59.7	40.3
Åkerbo	2.5	2,662	27.6	5.3	62.9	2.1	1.9	29.6	70.4
Postal vote	1.6	1,661							
Total	3.4	106,125	43.6	19.5	25.2	5.1	6.6	50.3	49.7
Source: SCB

=== Kopparberg ===
Location	Share	Votes	S	AV	B	FP	K	Left	Right
Avesta	3.0	3,408	58.9	6.8	0.2	11.4	22.7	81.6	18.4
Borlänge	8.3	9,408	65.0	7.3	2.3	11.3	13.6	78.6	21.0
Falu Norra	8.2	9,294	50.6	6.4	16.9	18.8	6.3	57.0	42.0
Falu Södra	5.2	5,915	37.7	4.2	38.9	12.4	6.4	44.1	55.5
Falun	5.6	6,433	44.5	23.1	0.8	24.3	5.2	49.7	48.2
Folkare	6.8	7,708	49.6	5.2	21.1	10.7	13.1	62.7	37.0
Hedemora	1.8	2,095	50.2	15.8	4.6	24.2	4.7	54.8	44.5
Hedemora ting	7.7	8,720	51.3	3.9	31.1	9.0	4.3	55.6	44.0
Leksand-Gagnef	8.8	10,085	43.6	6.5	24.1	21.9	3.2	46.9	52.5
Ludvika	3.2	3,702	60.2	16.5	1.3	13.4	8.2	68.4	31.2
Malung	5.7	6,544	60.8	8.8	10.8	14.7	4.8	65.6	34.2
Mora	5.9	6,778	43.4	7.0	23.5	19.3	5.8	49.2	49.7
Nås	5.9	6,771	57.0	7.8	13.5	11.2	9.3	66.3	32.5
Orsa	2.8	3,181	47.2	11.4	21.1	11.9	4.4	51.6	44.4
Rättvik	3.9	4,494	41.9	8.3	16.0	21.5	11.9	53.8	45.8
Särna-Idre	0.9	978	60.7	9.2	4.6	19.0	4.5	65.2	32.8
Säter	0.9	1,065	61.4	13.5	3.0	19.9	2.2	63.6	36.4
Västerbergslag	11.4	13,047	64.3	5.0	7.6	8.5	14.2	78.5	21.2
Älvdalen	1.9	2,145	57.3	7.0	15.5	14.0	1.6	58.9	36.5
Postal vote	1.9	2,185							
Total	3.7	113,956	52.6	8.3	15.1	14.8	8.4	61.0	38.2
Source: SCB

=== Kristianstad ===
Location	Share	Votes	S	AV	B	FP	K	Left	Right
Albo	3.3	3,805	38.7	15.3	23.3	19.1	0.7	39.4	57.8
Bjäre	5.8	6,625	37.6	17.0	37.8	6.7	1.0	38.6	61.4
Gärd	7.0	7,970	46.9	11.0	19.7	20.3	1.3	48.2	51.1
Hässleholm	2.9	3,292	53.7	22.1	6.5	13.3	3.8	57.6	42.0
Ingelstad	9.9	11,246	44.5	12.6	25.7	14.2	0.3	44.8	52.5
Järrestad	3.5	3,976	47.9	10.1	25.4	14.6	0.2	48.1	50.1
Kristianstad	8.4	9,577	50.4	22.7	2.7	18.1	5.9	56.3	43.5
Norra Åsbo	11.9	13,630	44.1	14.0	28.0	9.0	4.3	48.5	51.0
Simrishamn	1.2	1,363	56.3	29.6	0.2	13.1	0.7	57.0	42.8
Södra Åsbo	6.3	7,207	51.5	9.9	29.4	4.6	4.4	55.8	43.8
Villand	9.7	11,111	50.9	10.7	15.7	11.9	10.4	61.4	38.2
Västra Göinge	13.5	15,423	34.2	13.4	34.5	14.3	2.8	37.0	62.3
Ängelholm	2.9	3,312	58.2	26.9	2.0	8.1	4.7	62.9	37.0
Östra Göinge	11.8	13,488	46.9	10.5	20.2	13.8	8.0	55.0	44.5
Postal vote	1.9	2,120							
Total	3.7	114,145	45.4	14.5	22.2	13.0	4.1	49.5	49.7
Source: SCB

=== Kronoberg ===
Location	Share	Votes	S	AV	B	FP	K	Left	Right
Allbo	17.6	12,273	38.9	21.7	29.2	5.8	4.5	43.3	56.7
Kinnevald	9.3	6,445	36.1	26.6	29.7	2.9	4.7	40.8	59.2
Konga	16.1	11,232	39.6	17.1	32.5	2.7	8.1	47.7	52.3
Ljungby	3.7	2,589	44.7	20.2	7.6	17.3	10.1	54.8	45.2
Norrvidinge	5.2	3,610	38.4	19.6	37.1	3.1	1.9	40.2	59.8
Sunnerbo	19.7	13,733	31.1	17.2	38.4	8.7	4.6	35.7	64.3
Uppvidinge	16.9	11,735	46.7	10.4	26.3	4.2	12.3	59.1	40.9
Växjö	9.9	6,879	46.4	31.9	4.8	8.5	8.4	54.8	45.2
Postal vote	1.6	1,091							
Total	2.3	69,587	39.5	19.7	28.0	5.9	6.9	46.4	53.6
Source: SCB

=== Malmöhus ===
==== Malmö area ====
Location	Share	Votes	S	AV	B	FP	K	Left	Right
Hälsingborg	21.6	32,727	59.3	22.5	1.2	6.5	9.6	68.9	30.2
Landskrona	8.0	12,075	65.5	14.2	0.5	8.1	11.2	76.7	22.9
Lund	10.4	15,719	53.7	26.6	2.3	12.2	4.3	58.0	41.1
Malmö	57.5	87,008	58.8	24.8	0.7	5.1	9.6	68.4	30.6
Postal vote	2.5	3,800							
Total	4.9	151,329	58.4	24.3	0.9	6.5	9.0	67.3	31.7
Source: SCB

==== Malmöhus County ====
Location	Share	Votes	S	AV	B	FP	K	Left	Right
Bara	7.6	10,169	59.0	12.4	20.6	3.9	4.0	62.9	36.9
Eslöv	2.7	3,561	58.5	23.8	3.8	10.2	3.3	61.8	37.8
Frosta	8.8	11,670	34.7	8.9	29.0	23.2	1.0	35.6	61.1
Färs	7.5	10,041	37.7	9.3	31.3	21.3	0.4	38.1	61.8
Harjager	4.5	5,940	57.2	10.8	27.5	3.4	1.0	58.2	41.7
Herrestad	2.5	3,281	56.8	6.9	25.9	9.9	0.5	57.3	42.7
Höganäs	2.8	3,731	78.3	11.1	1.5	7.0	2.1	80.4	19.6
Ljunit	2.1	2,769	50.4	5.6	37.3	6.6	0.0	50.5	49.5
Luggude	13.9	18,498	55.1	10.7	24.9	5.5	3.5	58.6	41.1
Onsjö	5.5	7,370	48.1	9.9	37.5	3.6	0.8	48.9	51.0
Oxie	6.4	8,508	59.4	11.1	23.4	3.1	3.0	62.4	37.5
Rönneberg	4.1	5,508	60.7	12.5	22.2	3.7	0.7	61.4	38.5
Skanör-Falsterbo	0.3	421	35.6	35.4	5.9	17.1	1.2	36.8	58.4
Skytt	4.8	6,433	52.7	10.9	27.8	5.3	2.2	54.9	44.0
Torna	7.1	9,471	52.3	9.7	33.1	4.1	0.7	52.9	46.9
Trelleborg	5.7	7,535	57.7	19.2	1.0	10.1	11.8	69.5	30.2
Vemmenhög	7.4	9,831	49.2	9.7	32.2	7.8	1.1	50.3	49.6
Ystad	4.7	6,309	67.3	21.7	0.6	8.7	1.6	68.9	31.0
Postal vote	1.6	2,094							
Total	4.3	133,140	52.9	12.3	23.6	8.6	2.4	55.3	44.5
Source: SCB

=== Norrbotten ===
Location	Share	Votes	S	AV	B	FP	K	Left	Right
Arvidsjaur-Arjeplog	6.3	5,434	40.3	8.1	3.1	14.2	34.1	74.4	25.4
Boden	4.5	3,884	55.3	23.1	0.8	10.4	9.4	64.7	34.3
Gällivare	9.3	8,029	42.6	19.3	0.4	1.4	35.2	77.8	21.0
Haparanda	1.2	1,058	44.6	36.3	0.7	4.3	13.8	58.4	41.3
Jokkmokk	3.2	2,779	43.9	10.1	0.4	7.0	37.9	81.8	17.5
Jukkasjärvi	7.6	6,551	41.2	12.5	0.3	7.4	38.7	79.9	20.0
Karesuando	0.1	130	34.6	37.7	0.0	20.8	6.2	40.8	58.5
Luleå	7.8	6,783	41.9	22.6	0.9	7.8	26.1	67.9	31.4
Nederkalix	9.4	8,172	54.9	11.1	13.1	5.2	15.5	70.4	29.4
Nederluleå	5.2	4,512	32.9	21.4	26.3	9.4	10.0	42.8	57.1
Pajala-Korpilombolo	5.2	4,502	37.5	20.2	3.2	1.8	34.4	71.9	25.2
Piteå	2.4	2,110	62.9	20.3	1.5	7.1	7.9	70.8	29.0
Piteå-Älvsby	15.2	13,209	57.0	6.1	16.7	3.0	17.2	74.2	25.8
Råneå	4.5	3,889	48.5	10.5	12.8	5.7	21.8	70.4	28.9
Torneå	6.7	5,767	40.1	13.1	22.0	1.5	23.3	63.4	36.5
Överkalix	3.5	3,056	49.6	2.9	17.9	2.8	26.8	76.3	23.6
Överluleå	6.0	5,167	44.5	10.7	13.3	8.7	22.6	67.1	32.7
Postal vote	1.9	1,673							
Total	2.8	86,705	46.3	14.1	9.3	5.8	24.0	70.4	29.1
Source: SCB

=== Skaraborg ===
Location	Share	Votes	S	AV	B	FP	K	Left	Right
Barne	4.8	5,206	18.0	30.9	33.1	14.8	2.8	20.8	78.9
Falköping	4.1	4,501	47.2	24.2	1.7	22.8	3.6	50.8	48.6
Frökind	0.9	990	11.1	31.5	45.3	10.3	1.8	12.9	87.1
Gudhem	3.5	3,776	32.3	15.1	40.1	10.5	1.9	34.3	65.7
Hjo	1.4	1,579	44.6	27.1	2.3	23.5	2.3	47.0	52.9
Kinne	5.0	5,423	41.5	13.8	14.5	21.8	8.2	49.8	50.1
Kinnefjärding	2.6	2,804	33.4	16.3	32.3	15.4	2.6	36.0	64.0
Kåkind	6.3	6,874	36.6	14.0	28.1	15.3	6.0	42.6	57.4
Kålland	4.1	4,460	27.0	19.1	25.6	24.8	3.3	30.3	69.5
Laske	2.3	2,539	18.5	26.1	42.2	11.1	2.0	20.5	79.4
Lidköping	5.3	5,813	43.7	18.9	0.4	15.7	21.2	65.0	35.0
Mariestad	2.9	3,175	41.6	23.5	0.3	21.4	13.1	54.7	45.1
Skara	3.2	3,479	47.9	24.2	2.6	17.2	8.0	55.9	44.0
Skåning	4.4	4,760	23.6	22.1	40.3	12.7	1.3	24.9	75.1
Skövde	6.0	6,546	43.9	24.2	2.5	18.7	10.8	54.7	45.3
Tidaholm	2.8	3,016	62.7	8.1	1.3	13.0	14.9	77.6	22.4
Vadsbo	19.2	20,935	40.6	15.0	27.3	11.8	5.1	45.7	54.1
Valle	1.9	2,029	43.0	17.1	23.4	14.1	2.2	45.2	54.6
Vartofta	9.5	10,328	31.0	13.5	40.3	13.5	1.7	32.7	67.3
Vilske	2.4	2,592	16.4	28.4	41.0	10.6	3.4	19.9	80.1
Viste	3.7	4,063	19.0	33.0	29.7	13.7	4.3	23.3	76.3
Åse	2.1	2,251	31.5	19.8	33.1	12.4	3.1	34.5	65.3
Postal vote	1.9	2,060							
Total	3.5	109,199	35.9	19.5	23.3	15.3	5.9	41.7	58.2
Source: SCB

=== Stockholm ===
==== Stockholm (city) ====
Location	Share	Votes	S	AV	FP	K	Left	Right
Stockholm	100.0	339,558	41.1	24.1	15.6	15.9	57.0	39.7
Total	11.0	339,558	41.1	24.1	15.6	15.9	57.0	39.7
Source: SCB

==== Stockholm County ====
Location	Share	Votes	S	AV	B	FP	K	Left	Right
Bro-Vätö	0.8	1,200	40.4	18.9	23.3	14.5	2.2	42.6	56.8
Danderyd	5.6	8,079	42.7	24.4	3.2	19.2	9.4	52.1	46.7
Djursholm	2.1	3,061	26.6	50.7	1.3	18.8	1.8	28.4	70.7
Frösåker	3.0	4,377	44.3	10.9	32.1	8.1	4.3	48.6	51.1
Frötuna-Länna	1.8	2,641	37.5	19.7	23.7	16.8	1.8	39.3	60.2
Färentuna	2.1	3,005	50.6	8.9	24.2	10.4	5.4	56.0	43.6
Lidingö	4.2	6,036	35.0	32.9	1.3	18.8	10.8	45.8	51.9
Lyhundra	1.2	1,702	31.0	20.3	32.1	9.5	6.4	37.4	61.9
Långhundra	1.1	1,606	39.5	11.1	37.7	10.4	1.2	40.7	59.2
Norrtälje	1.9	2,754	47.6	23.9	0.9	18.7	7.9	55.4	43.5
Närdinghundra	2.4	3,394	44.9	8.7	29.5	11.3	5.6	50.5	49.5
Seminghundra	1.0	1,390	35.9	14.0	38.1	10.1	1.9	37.8	62.1
Sigtuna	0.5	657	45.1	29.2	1.2	21.8	2.3	47.3	52.2
Sjuhundra	1.5	2,187	50.4	11.8	17.2	14.3	6.0	56.4	43.3
Sollentuna	11.9	17,131	54.8	10.9	2.2	18.1	13.4	68.2	31.2
Solna	9.2	13,295	44.3	14.6	0.5	14.4	25.7	70.0	29.4
Sotholm	6.8	9,824	55.6	8.9	11.7	12.1	11.3	66.9	32.7
Sundbyberg	4.6	6,615	55.0	7.1	0.3	10.7	26.7	81.7	18.1
Svartlösa	13.8	19,838	51.9	15.5	2.3	14.1	15.5	67.4	31.9
Södertälje	6.5	9,321	56.8	16.8	0.8	11.1	14.0	70.9	28.8
Vallentuna	2.1	2,973	53.7	13.9	14.6	10.9	6.0	59.7	39.5
Vaxholm	0.7	1,079	46.7	20.3	1.2	27.0	4.8	51.5	48.5
Väddö-Häverö	2.6	3,713	46.6	12.5	18.7	11.3	10.4	57.0	42.6
Värmdö	3.3	4,688	55.1	13.4	2.5	15.7	12.6	67.7	31.7
Åker	1.8	2,576	45.6	10.3	22.8	16.8	3.9	49.5	50.0
Ärlinghundra	1.9	2,766	50.5	9.1	23.2	13.8	3.1	53.7	46.2
Öknebo	3.1	4,514	59.9	14.1	7.9	11.3	6.6	66.6	33.2
Öregrund	0.3	493	39.4	26.8	2.2	26.6	5.1	44.4	55.6
Östhammar	0.4	581	40.4	26.9	1.5	28.2	2.8	43.2	56.6
Postal vote	1.7	2,498							
Total	4.7	143,994	48.8	14.5	8.0	14.5	12.1	60.8	38.5
Source:SCB

=== Södermanland ===
Location	Share	Votes	S	AV	B	FP	K	Left	Right
Daga	3.6	3,677	44.1	12.0	22.8	18.4	2.7	46.8	53.2
Eskilstuna	23.3	23,604	65.8	10.5	1.3	15.4	7.0	72.9	27.1
Hölebo	2.6	2,677	50.1	6.7	26.8	12.9	3.5	53.6	46.4
Jönåker	8.6	8,729	58.6	7.3	18.8	11.0	4.4	62.9	37.1
Katrineholm	5.9	5,998	62.8	11.7	0.8	18.7	6.0	68.7	31.3
Mariefred	0.8	798	51.0	19.3	3.0	26.6	0.1	51.1	48.9
Nyköping	7.2	7,296	59.3	18.5	1.5	15.9	4.8	64.1	35.9
Oppunda	14.0	14,159	51.2	7.4	21.4	17.5	2.6	53.7	46.3
Rönö	4.3	4,404	48.6	6.7	29.7	13.6	1.3	50.0	50.0
Selebo	2.6	2,634	49.9	10.3	27.9	9.7	2.1	52.1	47.9
Strängnäs	2.8	2,819	49.1	30.5	1.7	17.7	1.0	50.1	49.9
Torshälla	1.2	1,177	64.6	11.1	4.1	17.7	6.5	71.0	29.0
Trosa	0.6	592	49.7	27.9	3.9	11.8	6.8	56.4	43.6
Villåttinge	7.9	8,044	52.1	10.6	17.5	14.1	5.6	57.7	42.3
Västerrekarne	3.8	3,814	44.0	5.8	28.8	17.4	3.9	47.9	52.1
Åker	3.4	3,443	57.3	7.6	22.6	10.7	1.7	59.0	41.0
Österrekarne	5.3	5,336	50.0	9.2	23.6	15.5	1.7	51.6	48.4
Postal vote	2.1	2,100							
Total	3.3	101,301	56.0	11.0	13.4	15.3	4.3	60.3	39.7
Source: SCB

=== Uppsala ===
Location	Share	Votes	S	AV	B	FP	K	Left	Right
Bro	1.8	1,139	62.7	12.8	13.0	9.2	2.3	65.0	35.0
Bälinge	1.9	1,204	18.6	5.7	60.5	12.5	2.3	20.9	78.7
Enköping	4.8	3,089	56.1	20.6	1.3	15.3	6.2	62.3	37.2
Hagunda	2.7	1,747	36.7	11.6	37.1	12.8	1.8	38.6	61.4
Håbo	2.6	1,690	59.5	15.6	11.8	10.4	2.2	61.8	37.8
Lagunda	2.1	1,373	43.0	10.9	33.3	12.3	0.6	43.6	56.4
Norunda	3.6	2,316	40.3	7.3	30.4	17.7	4.1	44.5	55.5
Oland	13.7	8,792	45.9	6.2	24.2	16.8	6.9	52.8	47.2
Rasbo	2.1	1,346	44.9	6.2	33.4	13.5	1.9	46.8	53.2
Trögd	4.3	2,750	41.7	9.7	39.2	8.4	1.0	42.7	57.3
Ulleråker	5.2	3,365	50.5	7.0	15.9	17.0	9.4	59.9	40.0
Uppsala	29.8	19,211	47.7	23.5	0.7	20.3	7.5	55.2	44.5
Vaksala	2.9	1,870	47.0	8.5	25.6	13.5	5.1	52.1	47.6
Åsunda	2.9	1,847	41.4	9.0	42.0	6.1	1.2	42.7	57.1
Örbyhus	17.5	11,242	64.1	4.1	15.3	11.4	5.1	69.2	30.7
Postal vote	2.2	1,425							
Total	2.1	64,406	49.4	13.4	16.0	15.5	5.5	54.9	44.9
Source: SCB

=== Värmland ===
Location	Share	Votes	S	AV	B	FP	K	Left	Right
Arvika	5.0	6,256	43.6	11.6	3.3	18.3	22.9	66.6	33.2
Filipstad	2.1	2,697	47.5	19.9	0.4	15.6	16.0	63.5	36.0
Fryksdal	10.9	13,648	42.4	11.3	23.0	12.1	10.9	53.3	46.4
Färnebo	6.5	8,121	68.7	4.9	2.6	7.1	16.5	85.2	14.6
Gillberg	4.1	5,173	48.3	8.9	20.3	14.4	7.9	56.2	43.6
Grums	4.4	5,559	54.8	5.8	15.1	8.1	16.1	70.9	28.9
Jösse	7.2	9,031	48.3	10.0	17.4	14.4	9.8	58.0	41.7
Karlstad	10.8	13,519	46.0	22.2	0.8	16.2	14.5	60.4	39.1
Karlstad hundred	5.1	6,458	57.6	7.9	5.1	9.3	19.8	77.4	22.4
Kil	7.3	9,167	53.8	6.1	15.9	11.8	12.1	65.9	33.8
Kristinehamn	5.6	7,070	54.7	14.1	0.5	17.2	13.3	68.0	31.7
Nordmark	5.3	6,724	38.9	9.5	23.8	21.8	5.5	44.4	55.2
Nyed	2.0	2,547	46.0	7.7	27.4	13.0	5.5	51.6	48.1
Näs	4.8	6,013	34.4	11.7	29.2	11.6	12.9	47.3	52.5
Visnum	2.3	2,935	44.5	6.8	26.5	11.6	10.3	54.8	44.8
Väse	2.6	3,247	40.5	9.8	30.9	15.8	2.8	43.3	56.5
Älvdal	11.0	13,782	53.6	7.1	6.3	7.2	25.5	79.1	20.7
Ölme	1.3	1,573	41.8	12.5	24.6	14.9	5.8	47.6	52.0
Postal vote	1.8	2,214							
Total	4.1	125,734	48.9	11.0	12.8	12.9	14.1	63.0	36.7
Source: SCB

=== Västerbotten ===
Location	Share	Votes	S	AV	B	FP	K	Left	Right
Burträsk	4.1	3,830	27.4	20.2	26.3	24.8	1.3	28.7	71.3
Degerfors	4.8	4,476	40.7	10.5	10.9	36.8	1.0	41.7	58.3
Lycksele	11.8	10,885	44.4	9.1	3.1	36.8	6.6	51.0	49.0
Norsjö-Malå	4.7	4,336	42.9	11.9	4.1	33.4	7.8	50.6	49.4
Nordmaling-Bjurholm	9.8	9,035	46.9	11.5	16.4	23.6	1.6	48.5	51.5
Nysätra	7.6	7,020	29.9	15.3	22.3	31.9	0.6	30.5	69.5
Skellefteå	5.2	4,798	53.6	21.7	0.5	15.3	8.9	62.5	37.5
Skellefteå ting	18.3	16,899	44.2	18.1	14.2	18.5	4.9	49.1	50.9
Umeå	6.4	5,922	49.8	25.5	1.5	20.8	2.4	52.2	47.8
Umeå ting	14.6	13,517	39.4	10.2	21.0	25.6	3.8	43.2	56.8
Vilhelmina	7.0	6,449	58.4	4.7	13.5	19.4	4.2	62.5	37.5
Åsele	3.5	3,256	53.1	8.3	13.5	22.1	3.1	56.2	43.8
Postal vote	2.2	2,023							
Total	3.0	92,446	44.1	13.9	12.8	25.2	4.0	48.0	52.0
Source: SCB

=== Västernorrland ===
Location	Share	Votes	S	AV	B	FP	K	Left	Right
Boteå	5.1	6,357	56.0	7.3	17.6	3.5	15.6	71.6	28.4
Härnösand	4.5	5,607	41.7	26.2	2.2	17.9	10.4	52.1	46.3
Medelpad Västra	12.6	15,700	46.6	4.7	23.5	9.1	16.1	62.7	37.3
Medelpad Östra	19.3	23,986	55.6	4.0	11.0	8.8	20.4	76.0	23.9
Sollefteå	1.2	1,542	46.2	36.8	4.0	10.0	2.3	48.6	50.7
Sollefteå ting	3.9	4,915	65.3	7.7	15.7	2.3	8.9	74.2	25.7
Sundsvall	7.1	8,862	43.0	27.6	1.3	19.7	7.9	50.9	48.6
Ångermanland Norra	17.5	21,811	46.9	8.6	17.6	16.8	10.1	57.0	43.0
Ångermanland Södra	15.5	19,311	47.9	6.0	19.1	7.6	19.3	67.2	32.7
Ångermanland Västra	8.8	10,923	51.6	7.2	26.1	2.7	12.2	63.8	36.0
Örnsköldsvik	2.1	2,649	38.2	27.5	1.4	23.3	9.4	47.6	52.1
Postal vote	2.2	2,789							
Total	4.0	124,452	49.6	9.8	15.4	10.5	14.5	64.1	35.7
Source: SCB

=== Västmanland ===
Location	Share	Votes	S	AV	B	FP	K	Left	Right
Arboga	3.4	2,831	59.7	13.7	0.5	19.1	6.9	66.5	33.4
Fagersta	5.7	4,813	67.2	7.6	2.7	8.1	14.4	81.6	18.4
Gamla Norberg	4.4	3,683	61.1	7.8	8.9	9.5	12.6	73.7	26.3
Köping	5.0	4,169	55.6	13.0	5.7	12.8	13.0	68.6	31.4
Norrbo	3.2	2,714	57.8	3.3	29.0	8.8	1.1	58.9	41.1
Sala	4.7	3,932	52.7	20.0	7.0	12.9	7.5	60.2	39.8
Siende	3.0	2,544	60.4	6.4	14.4	10.9	7.8	68.2	31.8
Simtuna	4.9	4,091	38.9	9.6	32.5	12.7	6.2	45.1	54.9
Skinnskatteberg	3.1	2,569	62.2	5.0	10.4	8.5	13.9	76.1	23.9
Snevringe	12.9	10,834	60.1	5.0	12.8	8.0	14.1	74.2	25.8
Torstuna	2.6	2,176	39.9	10.4	26.1	10.8	12.8	52.7	47.3
Tuhundra	1.1	946	43.8	4.5	39.7	9.2	2.7	46.5	53.5
Vagnsbro	1.8	1,530	31.0	2.5	49.6	15.7	1.2	32.2	67.8
Våla	4.2	3,559	35.8	5.7	35.6	19.2	3.6	39.4	60.6
Västerås	23.6	19,813	56.8	13.7	1.3	15.5	12.7	69.6	30.4
Yttertjurbo	1.2	1,043	44.3	7.7	35.3	11.6	1.2	45.4	54.6
Åkerbo	9.6	8,012	52.0	5.6	21.5	9.6	11.2	63.3	36.7
Övertjurbo	3.5	2,903	32.7	5.4	51.2	9.6	1.1	33.8	66.2
Postal vote	2.0	1,696							
Total	2.7	83,858	53.6	9.6	14.3	12.2	10.3	63.9	36.1
Source: SCB

=== Älvsborg ===
==== Älvsborg N ====
Location	Share	Votes	S	AV	B	FP	K	Left	Right
Ale	8.4	6,760	43.7	8.7	28.4	8.8	10.5	54.2	45.8
Alingsås	5.6	4,526	46.8	17.2	0.4	25.9	9.7	56.5	43.5
Bjärke	2.4	1,914	22.3	14.7	28.3	32.8	2.0	24.2	75.8
Flundre	4.3	3,464	59.6	7.2	19.5	5.1	8.7	68.2	31.8
Gäsene	4.9	3,964	15.3	30.3	35.6	17.3	1.4	16.8	83.2
Kulling	8.8	7,147	26.8	19.1	22.0	29.0	3.0	29.8	70.2
Nordal	5.5	4,479	43.6	9.7	34.0	10.9	1.8	45.5	54.5
Sundal	6.0	4,811	11.5	15.0	66.7	6.0	0.8	12.3	87.7
Trollhättan	10.4	8,391	62.5	10.8	0.8	13.8	12.0	74.6	25.4
Tössbo	3.2	2,621	34.4	10.5	33.1	12.6	9.5	43.8	56.2
Valbo	4.9	3,977	35.3	11.3	45.9	6.4	1.1	36.4	63.6
Vedbo	10.4	8,379	41.8	7.7	28.1	15.1	7.3	49.1	50.9
Väne	7.1	5,770	53.2	9.3	17.3	10.2	10.1	63.3	36.7
Vänersborg	5.2	4,162	48.2	26.0	2.0	14.1	9.7	57.9	42.1
Vättle	7.0	5,685	42.9	14.7	11.6	21.1	9.7	52.6	47.4
Åmål	4.3	3,483	51.7	18.0	0.6	19.3	10.5	62.1	37.9
Postal vote	1.5	1,235							
Total	2.6	80,768	41.3	14.1	22.1	15.4	7.1	48.5	51.5
Source: SCB

==== Älvsborg S ====
Location	Share	Votes	S	AV	B	FP	K	Left	Right
Bollebygd	4.1	3,050	44.7	31.9	13.6	6.5	2.9	47.6	52.1
Borås	31.1	22,939	49.1	27.4	0.5	9.3	13.4	62.4	37.2
Kind	19.0	14,031	34.9	23.7	33.4	7.0	1.0	35.8	64.1
Mark	22.3	16,420	45.4	25.1	19.9	3.3	6.0	51.5	48.3
Redväg	5.0	3,689	16.7	20.9	43.4	18.3	0.6	17.3	82.6
Ulricehamn	4.3	3,168	37.9	33.2	5.9	20.7	2.1	40.1	59.8
Veden	4.8	3,533	30.1	33.3	21.5	9.7	5.1	35.2	64.5
Ås	7.6	5,595	32.2	26.5	29.9	9.3	1.9	34.0	65.7
Postal vote	1.8	1,330							
Total	2.4	73,755	40.8	26.8	17.4	8.4	6.4	47.2	52.6
Source: SCB

=== Örebro ===
Location	Share	Votes	S	AV	B	FP	K	Left	Right
Asker	3.4	3,786	37.8	9.1	26.5	25.0	1.7	39.5	60.5
Askersund	1.0	1,066	44.5	26.5	2.9	22.9	3.2	47.7	52.3
Edsberg	4.5	4,968	46.3	7.4	21.6	17.5	7.1	53.5	46.5
Fellingsbro	4.2	4,689	47.1	9.7	23.3	16.8	3.0	50.2	49.8
Glanshammar	2.2	2,462	37.8	10.0	31.6	19.3	1.3	39.1	60.9
Grimsten	2.9	3,163	52.3	7.3	12.4	14.9	13.1	65.4	34.6
Grythytte-Hällefors	3.7	4,117	61.9	5.6	1.5	7.8	23.2	85.1	14.9
Hardemo	0.8	868	32.3	8.1	37.8	18.7	3.2	35.5	64.5
Karlskoga	11.6	12,787	49.4	9.5	5.8	9.2	26.1	75.5	24.5
Karlskoga hundred	3.6	3,927	59.6	4.5	11.2	8.6	16.0	75.6	24.4
Kumla	3.2	3,535	49.0	7.5	1.3	24.1	18.1	67.2	32.8
Kumla hundred	5.9	6,486	48.9	11.1	12.9	18.3	8.8	57.7	42.3
Lindes-Ramsberg	4.6	5,076	52.0	5.8	28.9	7.3	5.9	57.9	42.1
Lindesberg	2.1	2,364	48.5	24.1	2.0	17.4	7.9	56.4	43.6
Nora	1.5	1,641	44.0	22.5	0.9	17.2	15.4	59.4	40.5
Nora-Hjulsjö	3.3	3,639	55.8	6.5	13.9	10.2	13.5	69.4	30.6
Nya Kopparberg	3.6	4,012	57.8	6.2	7.9	8.6	19.6	77.3	22.7
Sköllersta	3.6	3,972	39.3	9.1	20.1	28.1	3.4	42.6	57.4
Sundbo	3.2	3,553	56.6	5.1	26.2	7.4	4.7	61.3	38.7
Örebro	24.9	27,491	55.8	14.6	1.0	18.4	10.1	66.0	34.0
Örebro hundred	4.2	4,650	42.3	12.3	22.2	19.2	4.0	46.3	53.7
Postal vote	1.9	2,100							
Total	3.6	110,352	50.7	10.9	11.2	15.7	11.5	62.3	37.7
Source: SCB

=== Östergötland ===
Location	Share	Votes	S	AV	B	FP	K	Left	Right
Aska	5.2	8,404	60.1	9.1	9.1	7.6	14.0	74.1	25.9
Bankekind	3.7	5,975	57.5	9.4	18.5	9.0	5.6	63.1	36.9
Björkekind	1.0	1,606	39.7	16.3	36.4	6.8	0.8	40.5	59.5
Boberg	2.3	3,716	54.0	11.1	19.0	9.6	6.4	60.3	39.7
Bråbo	1.5	2,400	66.5	12.4	6.3	7.0	7.8	74.3	25.7
Dal	1.1	1,742	56.1	9.0	24.6	6.7	3.7	59.8	40.2
Finspånga län	7.9	12,838	59.3	10.1	16.4	8.0	6.2	65.4	34.6
Gullberg	2.0	3,219	56.6	9.8	19.2	7.2	7.1	63.7	36.2
Göstring	4.0	6,460	47.6	9.5	23.7	8.0	11.2	58.8	41.2
Hammarkind	4.6	7,395	47.7	15.3	25.5	7.2	4.2	52.0	48.0
Hanekind	2.2	3,542	55.2	14.1	19.9	6.5	4.4	59.5	40.5
Kinda	4.8	7,689	44.6	12.6	30.1	10.8	2.0	46.6	53.4
Linköping	13.3	21,555	52.8	23.5	1.6	10.3	11.8	64.6	35.4
Lysing	2.5	4,031	41.2	10.8	34.3	11.6	2.1	43.3	56.7
Lösing	1.2	1,997	58.6	13.6	15.8	6.1	5.9	64.4	35.6
Memming	1.5	2,414	66.1	10.1	6.4	7.4	10.0	76.1	23.9
Mjölby	2.1	3,347	65.0	15.7	5.2	10.9	3.3	68.2	31.8
Motala	2.5	3,968	48.2	26.0	0.6	13.4	11.5	59.7	40.0
Norrköping	23.0	37,149	56.0	23.3	1.0	6.3	13.4	69.4	30.6
Skänninge	0.5	887	45.8	28.1	8.5	14.9	2.8	48.6	51.4
Skärkind	1.3	2,100	49.2	11.0	31.6	6.4	1.7	50.9	49.1
Söderköping	0.9	1,417	48.9	28.1	5.1	15.9	2.0	50.9	49.1
Vadstena	1.0	1,609	52.3	27.5	1.9	15.1	3.2	55.5	44.5
Valkebo	1.9	3,097	48.8	13.9	27.1	8.8	1.3	50.1	49.9
Vifolka	2.0	3,252	48.4	12.7	25.2	8.6	5.0	53.5	46.5
Ydre	2.0	3,208	36.2	10.4	30.8	21.3	1.2	37.4	62.6
Åkerbo	0.8	1,237	37.3	17.7	33.4	9.5	2.0	39.4	60.6
Östkind	1.4	2,338	39.8	17.1	34.2	8.3	0.6	40.4	59.6
Postal vote	2.0	3,245							
Total	5.2	161,837	52.9	17.2	12.8	8.7	8.4	61.3	38.7
Source: SCB
