= Faura (disambiguation) =

Faura is a municipality in the Valencian Community, Spain.

Faura may also refer to:

- Óscar Faura (born 1975), Spanish cinematographer
- Federico Faura, Spanish Jesuit priest and director of the Manila Observatory, after whom Padre Faura Street in Manila, Philippines, is named

== See also ==
- Faurås Hundred, a former hundred in Halland, Sweden
