= Aska Hundred =

Historic geographic subdivision in Sweden

Aska Hundred Aska härad
- Hundred of Sweden
- Coat of arms

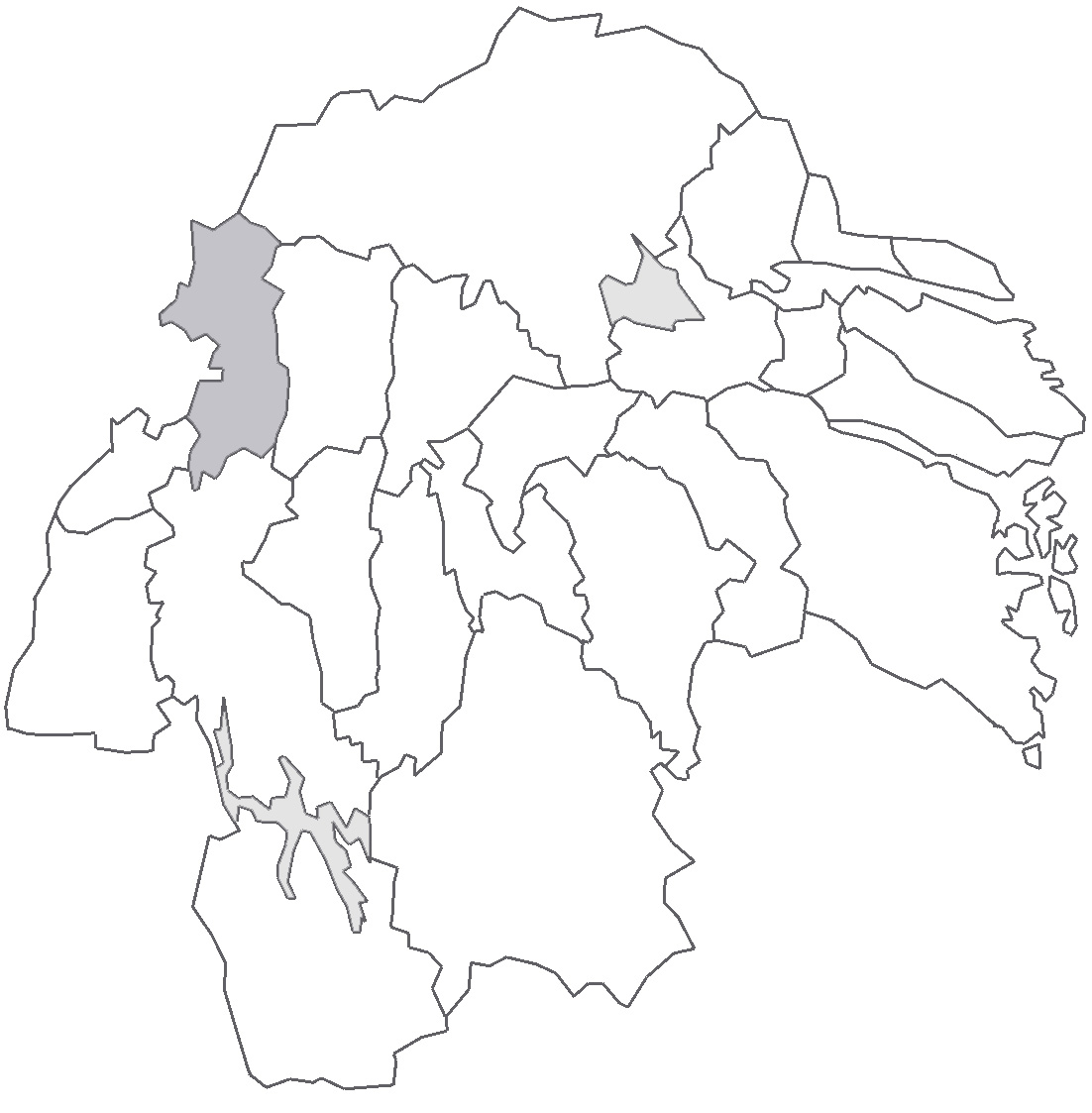
- Location within Östergötland

Aska Hundred, or Aska härad, was a hundred of Östergötland in Sweden.
