= Askome =

Coordinates: 57°1′3.4″N 12°40′14.7″E

Askome (Swedish pronunciation: [ˈâsːkɔmɛ]) is a village and former parish in Falkenberg Municipality, Halland County.

== Geography and geology ==
Askome is situated at the eastern bank of the river Ätran. The parish had an area of 32.82 km^{2}, of which 31.16 km^{2} was land. The parish was delimited by the river to then north and the west, except for a small area that used to be an ait. The island belonged to Ljungby, and still does so, even though it is now on the "wrong" side of the river. The parish bordered Vessige in the south and Gällared and Krogsered in the north and north east. The cultivated land is mainly along river Ätran and downstream Ätrafors, while the remainder is forested.

The bedrock consists of gneiss. The forested area is dominated by till, while the cultivated areas consists of gravel and clay. The area is comparatively hilly, the highest hill being Askome berg at 172 meter over sealeval, while the lowest point is along the river, at 20 meter over sealevel.

== History ==
Year	Population	Year	Population
1749	200	1885	453
1763	273	1907	344
1780	327	1925	330
1800	273	1945	351
1818	329	1955	295
1869	402		

Several flint object has been found in Askome, but no Stone Age graves. The remains from the Bronze Age is also sparse compared to surrounding areas. The main Iron Age remains are a centrally located stone circle and urn field, as well as two menhirs at Askome field.

Askome belonged to Årstad hundred. The name consists of two parts, ask and ome. Ask comes from ash, while ome means home and is common in hallandic placenames, in particular in vicinity of the village. The name is first mentioned in 1523. Letters from the following decades show that the village came to belong to Hjuleberg.

The current church was built in 1780 and a tower was added in 1804. The parish was merged with Alfshög and Vessigebro parishes in 2006 to form a new parish, Vessige. The old parish had about 200 inhabitants.
