= Årstad Hundred =

Historic geographic subdivision in Sweden

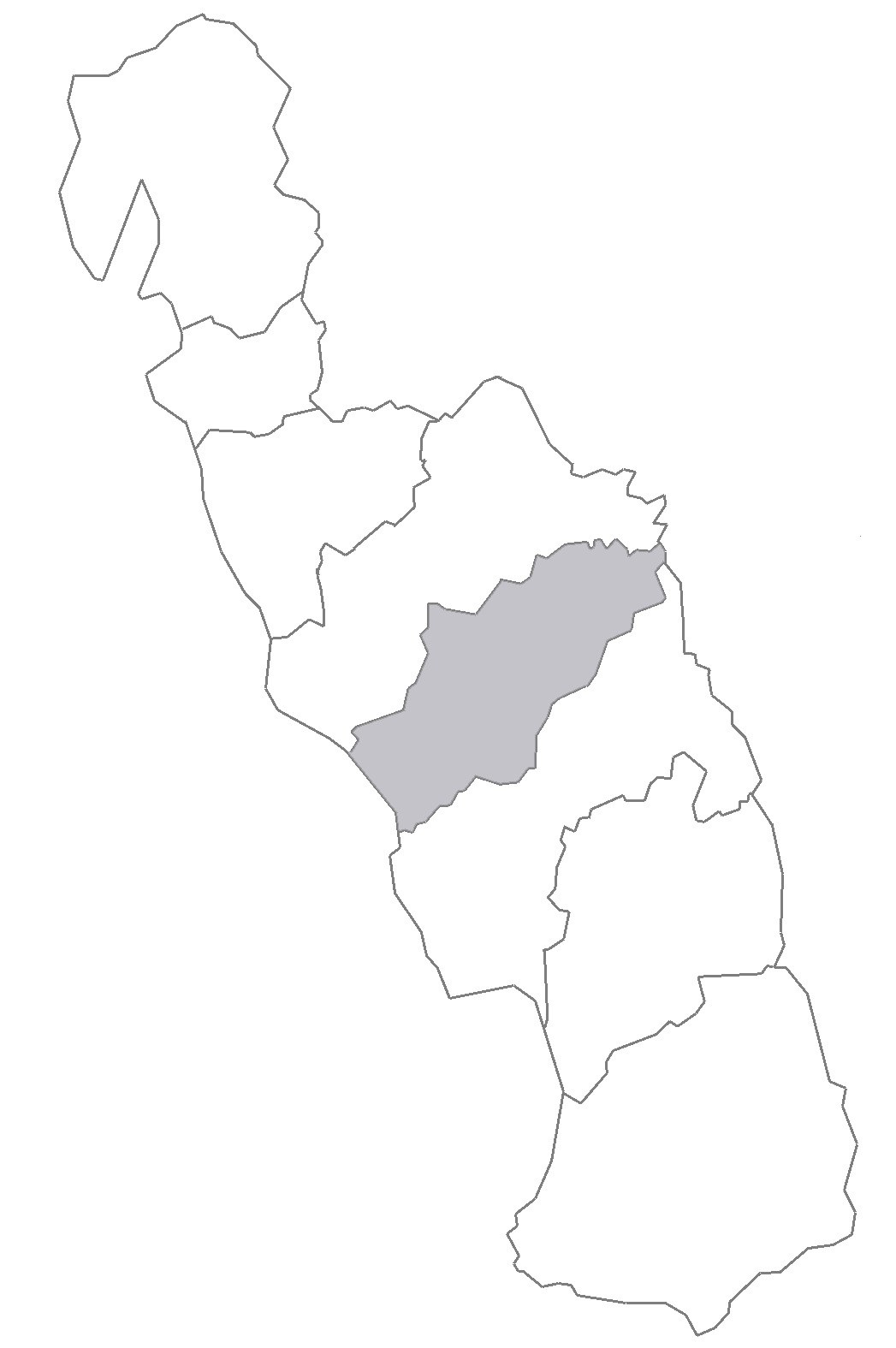
Location in Halland

Coat of arms (from 1962)

Årstad Hundred (Swedish: Årstads härad) was a hundred in central Halland in southern Sweden.

== Parishes ==
The hundred was divided into the following parishes:

In Falkenberg Municipality

- Abild
- Asige
- Askome
- Eftra
- Krogsered
- Skrea
- Slöinge
- Vessige
- Årstad

I Hylte Municipality:

- Drängsered
