= Halland =

Historical province of Sweden

Coordinates: 56°45′N 13°00′E

- Historical province
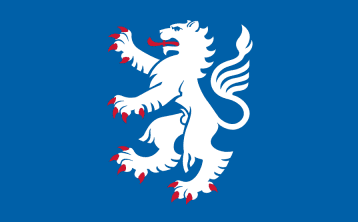
- Flag Coat of arms

- Country: Sweden
- Land: Götaland
- County: Halland County; Västra Götaland County; Skåne County

Area
  - Total: 4,796 km^{2} (1,852 sq mi)

Population (31 December 2023)
  - Total: 351,508
  - Density: 73.29/km^{2} (189.8/sq mi)

Ethnicity
  - Language: Swedish
  - Dialect: Halländska; Götamål

Culture
  - Flower: Broom
  - Animal: Salmon
  - Bird: Peregrine falcon
  - Fish: Salmonidae
- Time zone: UTC+1 (CET)
  - Summer (DST): UTC+2 (CEST)
- Area codes: 0300; 0340; 0345; 0346; 035; 0430

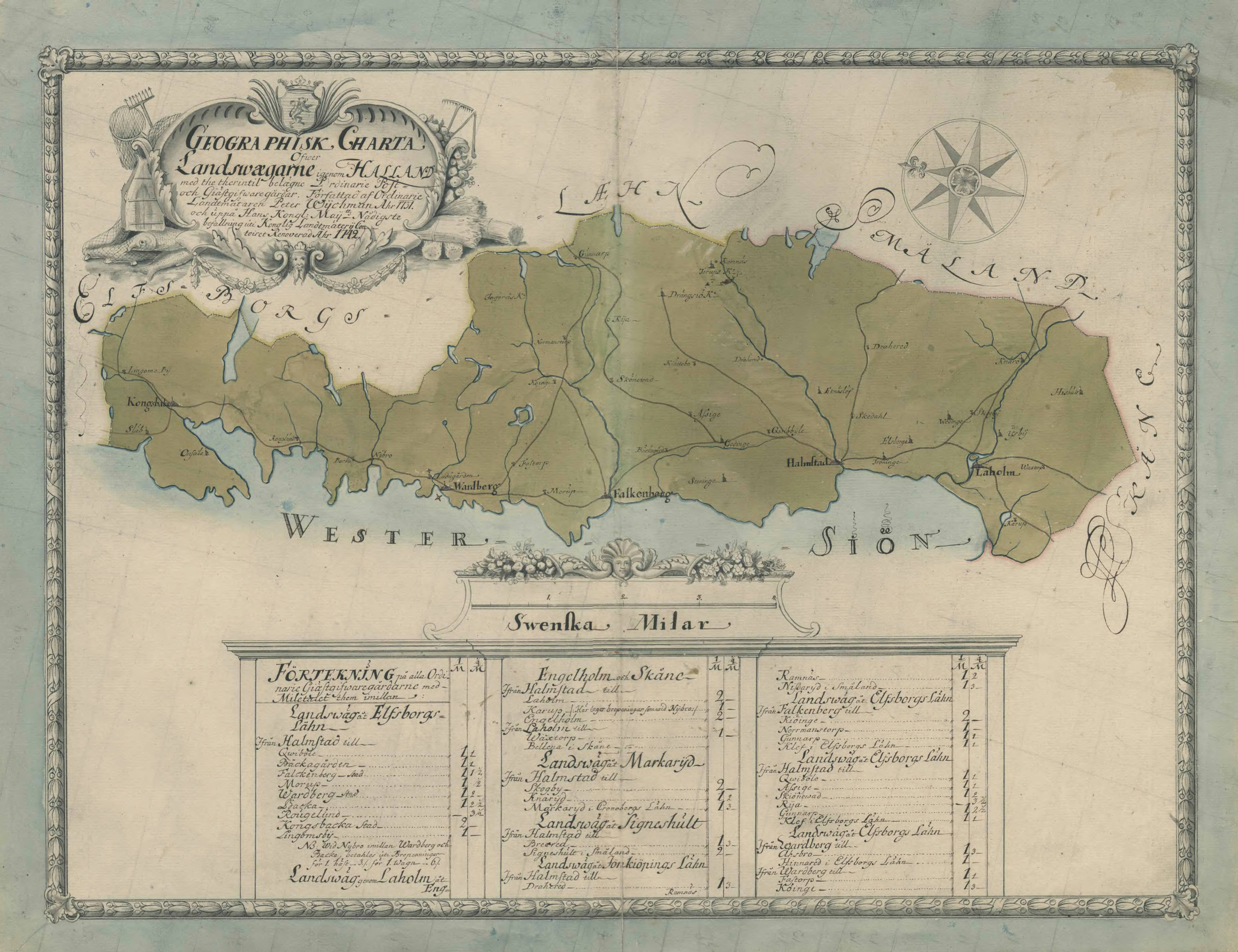
Map of the country roads through Halland in 1731.

Halland (Swedish pronunciation: [ˈhǎlːand]) is one of the traditional provinces of Sweden (landskap), on the western coast of Götaland, southern Sweden. It borders Västergötland, Småland, Scania and the sea of Kattegat. Until 1645 and the Second Treaty of Brömsebro, it was part of the Kingdom of Denmark. Its name means Land of Rocky Slabs (Swedish: hällar) referring to the coastal cliffs of especially the northern part of the region.

== Administration ==
The provinces of Sweden serve no administrative function. Instead, that function is served by the Counties of Sweden. However, the province of Halland is almost coextensive with the administrative Halland County, though parts of the province belong to Västra Götaland County and Skåne County, while the county also includes parts of Småland and Västergötland.

As of 31 December 2023, Halland had a population of 351,508.

== Heraldry ==
During the Danish era until 1658, the province had no coat of arms and no seal. In Sweden, however, every province had been represented by heraldic arms since 1560. When Charles X Gustav of Sweden suddenly died in 1660 a coat of arms had to be created for the newly acquired province, as each province was to be represented by its arms at the royal funeral. There are several theories about the choice of a lion. Bengt Algotsson, duke of Halland and Finland in the 14th century, used a lion in his personal arms, blazoned Azure, a Lion rampant Argent langued and armed Gules.

The same coat of arms was later granted for the administrative Halland County, which has almost the same boundaries.

== Geography ==
The rivers of Viskan, Ätran, Nissan and Lagan flow through the province and reach the sea in Kattegat. Halland is well known for its fertile soil and as an agricultural district.

Most of the region is made up of a relief unit known as the Sub-Mesozoic hilly peneplain. Around Morup and Tvååker hilltops are remnants of the Sub-Cambrian peneplain, an ancient erosion surface that covers much of eastern Sweden. Loose flint nodules of Cretaceous age have been found around Halland. The flints are remnants of a former cover of sedimentary rock that has been eroded. At present the sedimentary cover continues to exist in Scania, Denmark and offshore.

== History ==
=== Early history ===
The Bronze Age was probably a period of relative prosperity in Halland. This is shown in the number of new settlements and the numerous archaeological remains. Over 1,100 tumuli and grave mounds have been found.

The end of the Bronze Age witnessed an over-consumption of resources. Large areas were deforested. This might have been a result of a high demand for charcoal in smelting gold or bronze among the local elites.

The worsening climate at the beginning of the Iron Age meant that the local elites no longer could obtain bronze to the same extent as before. As a result, the social structures collapsed.

The early Iron Age social structures seem to have been relatively egalitarian, but from around 200 AD there was a trend in which villages formed larger communities and small kingdoms. This is likely to have been a distant influence from the growing Roman Empire. During the 5th and 6th century large free-standing farms were created; they grew larger as time passed. An example of such a farm can be found in Slöinge.

It was not just the social structure that changed, so too did the settlement structure. New villages were formed, while old ones were abandoned. The new centers that were formed became the kernel from which new areas were settled during medieval times.

=== 800–1645 AD ===
According to the account of Ohthere of Hålogaland, who traveled from Skiringssal, close to the Oslofjord to Hedeby in the 870s, it can be concluded that Halland was a Danish area at that time. It would stay so for most of recorded history.

Iron extraction is known to have taken place in Hishult and Tvååker/Sibbarp during the Iron Age.

As part of the Scanian lands (then part of the Kingdom of Denmark) Halland came under the Scanian Law and participated in the Scanian Thing, one of three Things electing the Danish king. Local assemblies took place in Getinge.

Halland was the scene of considerable military action from the 13th century and on as Sweden, Denmark and to some degree Norway fought for supremacy in Scandinavia. The many wars made the province poor. Not only were material damages caused by military action, but the social impact of the fighting was devastating; people lacked the motivation to invest in their land and properties as it was likely to be destroyed anyway.

The county was the site of combat and plunder three times during the 13th Century: in 1256 Haakon IV of Norway invaded, followed by Magnus III of Sweden in 1277 and Eric VI of Denmark in 1294. The county came to be split in two parts for the next century, with the river Ätran forming a boundary. The lords of the two parts succeeded each other in a high tempo.

As the Kalmar Union was formed, Halland came for a brief period of time to be centrally located. According to the union treaty, the king was to be elected in Halmstad.

During the rebellion of Engelbrekt in 1434 the fortress in Falkenberg was burnt down and two years later Lagaholm was captured by the Swedes. The Swedo-Danish struggles in the early 16th century came to affect the province as well, as in 1519 when the border regions were sacked by the Swedes as a vengeance for similar Danish action in Västergötland.

The Danish civil war called the Count's Feud in 1534–1536, the Northern Seven Years' War between Denmark-Norway and Sweden in 1563–1570 and the Kalmar War between Denmark-Norway and Sweden in 1611–1613 all affected Halland. One of the major battles of the Northern Seven Years' War, the battle of Axtorna, took place in Halland.

=== After 1645 ===
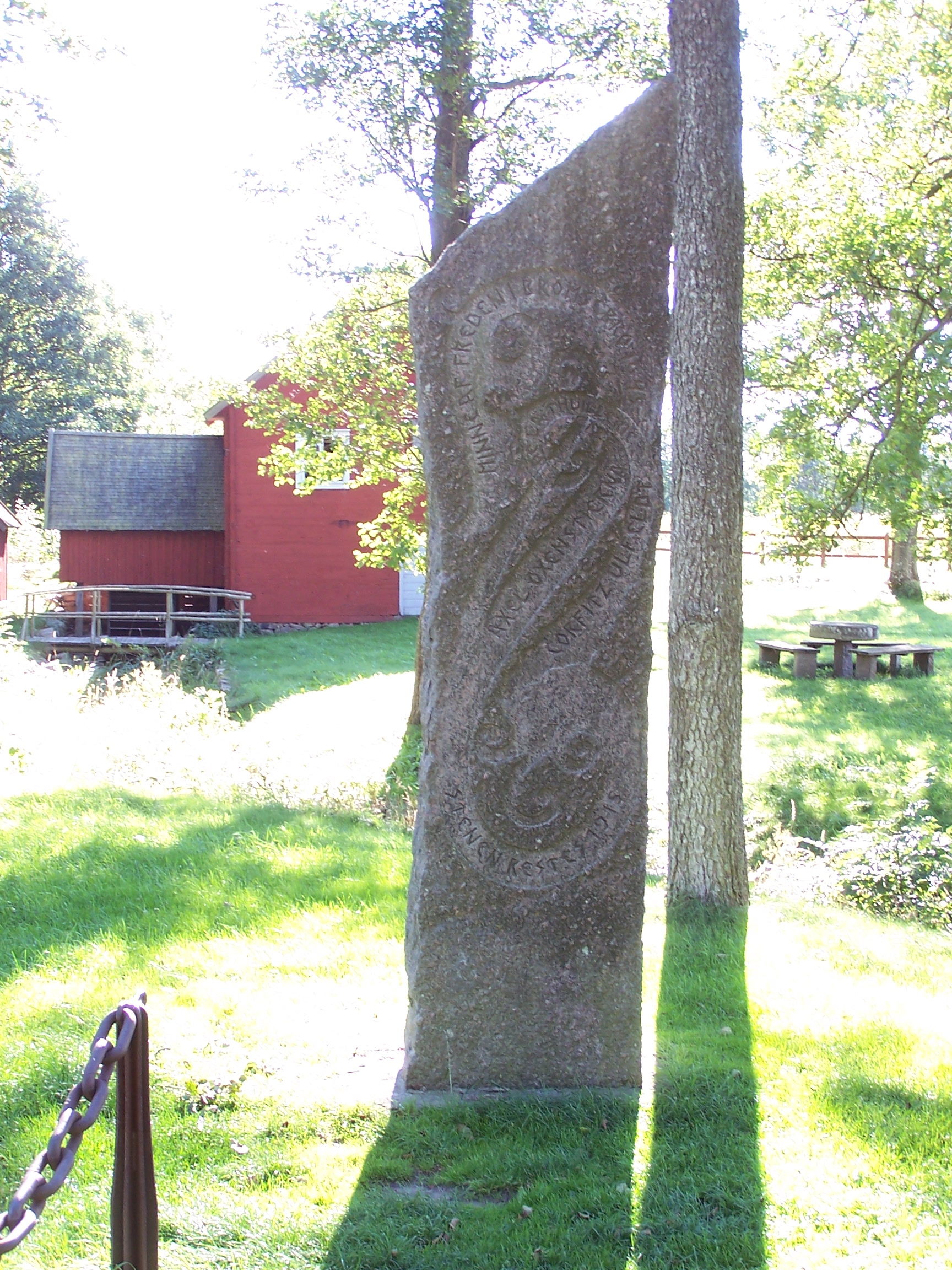
The peace stone in Brömsebro is not a runestone even if it looks like one. The stone was made in 1915 to commemorate the peace between Denmark and Sweden and the text is written with Latin letters. The text on the stone says "Memory of the peace in Brömsebro – Gaspard Coignet de La Thuilerie – Axel Oxenstierna – Corfitz Ulfeldt". The three named persons were the negotiators. Thuilerie was an ambassador from France, Oxenstierna represented Sweden and Ulfeldt represented Denmark.

Halland was temporarily (for a period of 30 years) transferred to Sweden in 1645 under the terms of the Second Treaty of Brömsebro. The conquest was later made permanent by the ceding of the province in the Treaty of Roskilde in 1658. The last battle in Halland took place in Fyllebro on 17 August 1676, during the Scanian War.

The more peaceful conditions that followed meant that the province could start to develop again. The 19th century saw the farming develop quickly to become one of the more efficient in the country by the end of the century. Parts of the province did however remain poor and erosion and blown sand remained a problem for much of the century. The county did therefore see a lot of emigration, continuing well into the 20th century.

The 20th century has seen the province becoming one of the fastest growing in Sweden, as it has doubled its population since World War II. This is in part due to the northern parts, such as Kungsbacka and Onsala, more or less becoming suburbs of Gothenburg.

=== Cities ===
During Danish rule, privileges to towns in Halland were granted to:

- Falkenberg (1558)
- Halmstad (1307)
- Kungsbacka (approximately 1400)
- Laholm (approximately 1200)
- Varberg (approximately 1100)

Such privileges have no official significance nowadays.

=== Hundreds ===
Hundreds of Sweden were provincial divisions until the early 20th century, when they lost importance. Halland's hundreds were: Faurås Hundred, Fjäre Hundred, Halmstad Hundred, Himle Hundred, Höks Hundred, Tönnersjö Hundred, Viske Hundred and Årstad Hundred.

== Culture ==
The language varieties spoken in Halland are together called halländska, though they belong to two main dialectal groups. In northern Halland a variation of the Götaland dialect is spoken and in the south the spoken language is a variety of Scanian.

== Sights ==
- Varberg Fortress, a medieval fortress.
- Tjolöholm Castle, a castle and museum in the Kungsbacka Fjord, just off of the Swedish coast.

== Dukes of Halland ==
As early as the 13th century, southern Halland was given as duchy to a branch of the Danish royal family. In the 14th century, it was given to various relatives and friends of Danish and Swedish royal families, such as Bengt Algotsson (during 1353–1357).

Since 1772 Swedish royal princes have been nominated dukes of provinces without political significance. Such a title was held by Prince Bertil, Duke of Halland (1912–1997), who was survived by his wife Princess Lilian, Duchess of Halland (1976–2013), and currently is held by Prince Julian (since 2021).

== Sports ==
Football in the province is administered by Hallands Fotbollförbund. Team handball is also popular, with HK Drott, HK Aranäs and HK Varberg.

== Sources ==
- Kungsvägen genom Halland – Bidrag till halländsk kulturhistoria och underlag för vägminnesvårdsprogram. Stellan Haverling. 1996. Gothenburg: Vägverket
