= Halländska =

Swedish dialect

A person speaking Swedish with the Halländska dialect.

Halländska is the name used for dialects of Swedish spoken in Halland, Sweden. In the southern parts of the county Scanian dialects dominate whilst in the north Götaland dialects dominate.

== Examples ==
Swedish	Halländska (Halmstad)	Halländska (Falkenberg)	English meaning
korv	kåv	kåv	sausage
tårta	tåata	tåta	torte (form of cake)
burk	buek	böek	can
sport	spoat	spott	sport
farmor	famo	famo	grandmother (paternal)
bordtennis	båadtennis	boedtennis	table tennis
