= Halmstad Hundred =

Historic geographic subdivision in Sweden

Location of Halmstad hundred in Halland

Coat of arms

Halmstad Hundred (Swedish: Halmstads härad) was a hundred in Halland, Sweden.

It was composed of Getinge, Harplinge, Holm, Kvibille, Rävinge, Slättåkra, Steninge, Söndrum, Vapnö and Övraby parishes, all currently in Halmstad Municipality, as well as Kinnared and Torup parishes in Hylte Municipality.
