= Höks Hundred =

Historic geographic subdivision in Sweden

Location of Höks hundred in Halland

Coat of arms

Höks Hundred (Swedish: Höks härad) was a hundred in Halland, Sweden. The name probably comes from tumulus ([grav]hög) or hook.

It was composed of the following parishes: Hasslöv, Hishult, Knäred, Laholm, Ränneslöv, Skummeslöv, Tjärby, Veinge, Våxtorp and Ysby, all currently in Laholm Municipality, as well as Östra Karup in Båstad Municipality.
