= Tönnersjö Hundred =

Historic geographic subdivision in Sweden

Location of Tönnersjö hundred in Halland

Coat of arms

Tönnersjö Hundred (Swedish: Tönnersjö härad) was a hundred in Halland, Sweden. It is probably named after either the village Tönnersjö in Tönnersjö parish or the (larger) village Tönnersa in Eldsberga parish.

It was composed of the following parishes (all now in Halmstad Municipality): Breared, Eldsberga, Enslöv, Snöstorp, Trönninge and Tönnersjö.
