= Viske Hundred =

Historic geographic subdivision in Sweden

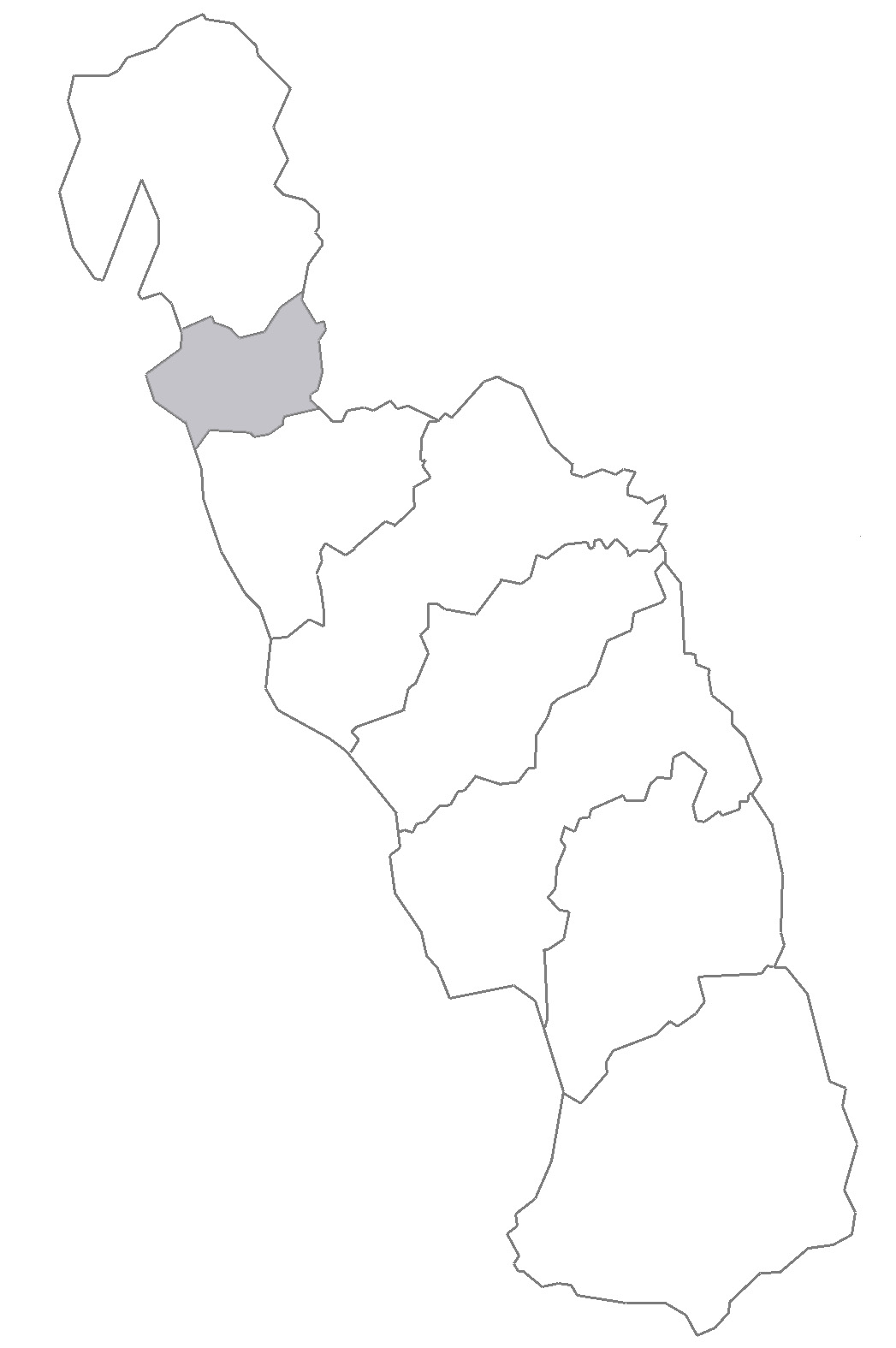
Location of Viske hundred in Halland

Coat of arms

Viske Hundred (Swedish: Viske härad) was a hundred in Halland, Sweden.

It was composed of Stråvalla, Sällstorp, Veddige, Värö and Ås parishes, all currently in Varberg Municipality
