= Algutsrum Hundred =

Historic geographic subdivison in Sweden

Coordinates: 56°39′N 16°29′E

Algutsrum Hundred, or Algutsrums härad, was a hundred of Öland in Sweden, located on the west side of the island in modern-day Mörbylånga Municipality.
