= Asker Hundred =

Former subdivision of Sweden

Asker Hundred (Swedish: Askers härad), was one of the old subdivisions of Sweden's provinces known as the Hundreds of Sweden.

In 1849, Wilhelm Tham wrote in his Description of Örebro county that Asker Hundred comprised three parishes: Stora Mällösa, Lännäs, and Asker.

It was divided between Närke province and Södermanland province.
