= Himle Hundred =

Historic geographic subdivision in Sweden

Location of Himle hundred in Halland

Coat of arms

Himle Hundred (Swedish: Himle härad) was a hundred in Halland, Sweden. The origin of its name is uncertain

It was composed of the following parishes (all now in Varberg Municipality): Grimeton, Gödestad, Hunnestad, Lindberg, Nösslinge, Rolfstorp, Skällinge, Spannarp, Stamnared, Torpa, Träslöv, Tvååker and Valinge.
