= Lister Hundred =

Lister Hundred, or Listers härad, was a hundred of Blekinge in Sweden.

== Parishes ==
Parishes ordered by municipality:

1. Karlshamn Municipality
  - Elleholm Parish
  - Mörrum Parish
2. Olofström Municipality
  - Jämshög Parish
  - Kyrkhult Parish
3. Sölvesborg Municipality
  - Mjällby Parish
  - Ysane Parish
  - Gammalstorp Parish
