= Fjäre Hundred =

Historic geographic subdivision in Sweden

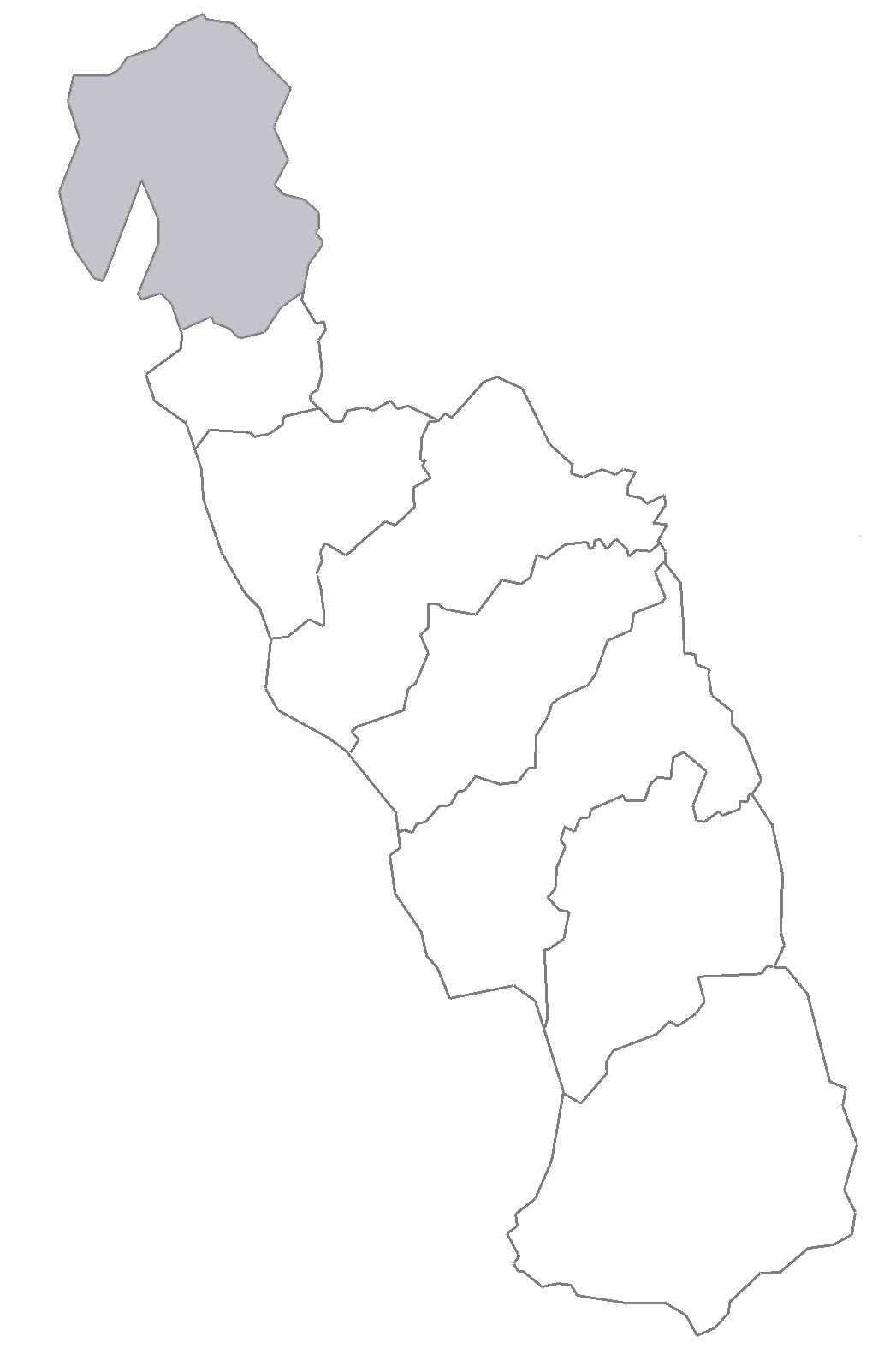
Location of 'Fjäre hundred in Halland

Coat of arms

Fjäre Hundred (Swedish: Fjäre härad) was a hundred in Halland, Sweden.

It was composed of Fjärås, Frillesås, Förlanda, Gällinge, Hanhals, Idala, Landa, Onsala, Släp, Tölö, Vallda, Älvsåker and Ölmevalla parishes in Kungsbacka Municipality as well as Lindome parish in Mölndal Municipality
