= Faurås Hundred =

Historic geographic subdivision in Sweden

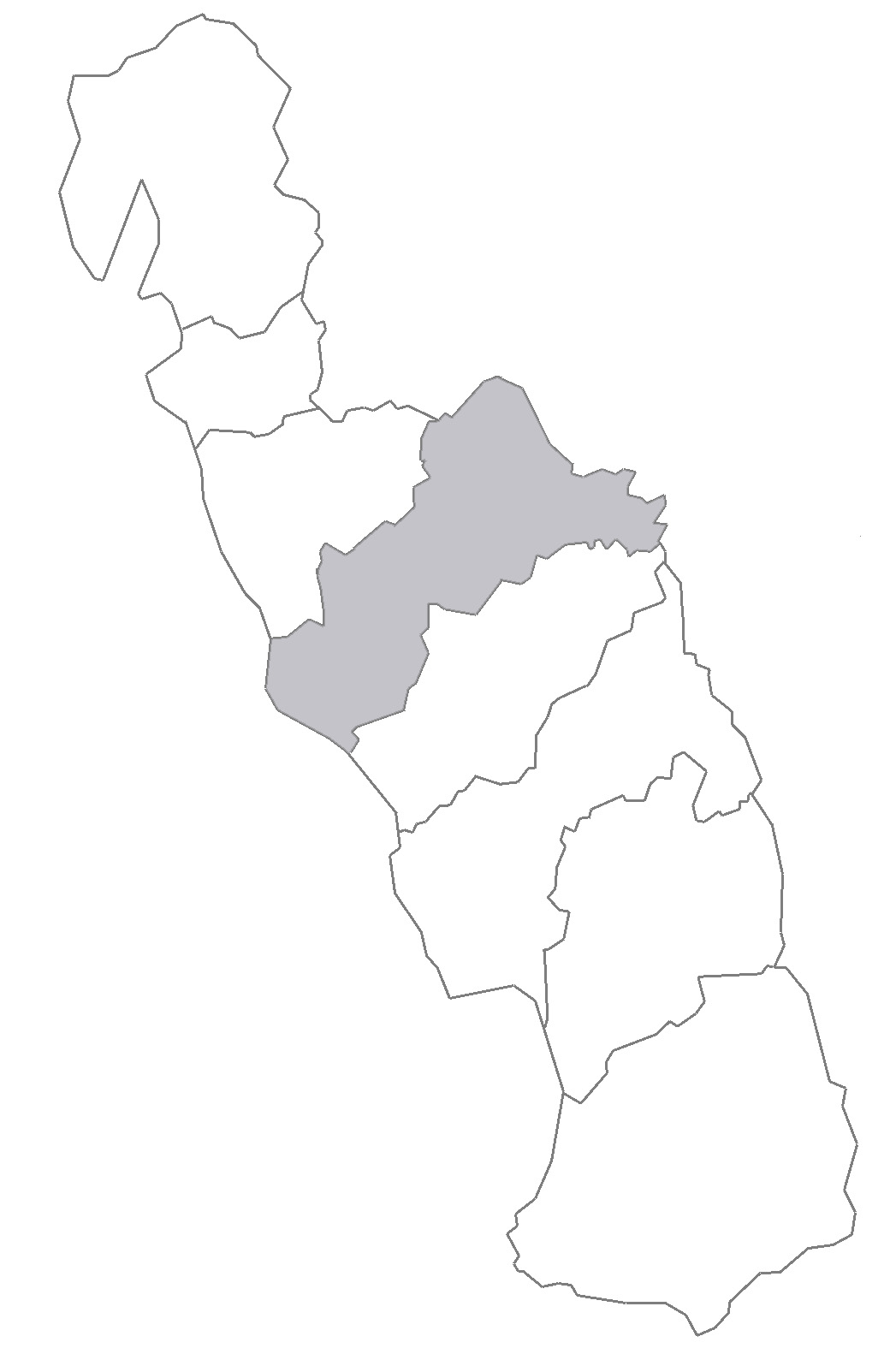
Location of Faurås hundred in Halland

Coat of arms

Faurås Hundred (Swedish: Faurås härad) was a hundred in Halland, Sweden.

It was composed of the following parishes: Alfshög, Fagered, Gunnarp, Gällared, Källsjö, Köinge, Ljungby, Morup, Okome, Stafsinge, Svartrå, Ullared and Vinberg in Falkenberg Municipality as well as Dagsås and Sibbarp parishes in Varberg Municipality.
