= Falkenberg (surname) =

Falkenberg is a surname. Notable people with the surname include:

- Andreas Fredrik Falkenberg (1875–1957), Norwegian engineer, businessperson and politician
- Anna Falkenberg (born 1996), Faroese politician
- Bob Falkenberg (born 1946), Canadian ice hockey player
- Carl Frederick Falkenberg (1897–1980), Canadian aviator
- Christopher Falkenberg, American Secret Service agent
- Cy Falkenberg (1879–1961), American baseball player
- Dietmar Falkenberg, East German bobsledder
- Dietrich von Falkenberg (1580–1631), German statesman
- Eckhard D. Falkenberg (born 1942), German computer scientist
- Gail Falkenberg (born 1947), American tennis player
- Gustaf Falkenberg (1860–1917), Swedish diplomat
- Hendrick Jacobs Falkenberg (c.1640–c.1712), Colonial American linguist
- Jens Falkenberg (1875–1963), Norwegian equestrian
- Johan Falkenberg (1901–1963), Norwegian fencer
- Johannes Falkenberg (1911–2004), Norwegian social anthropologist
- John of Falkenberg (1385–1430), German Dominican theologian and writer
- Kai Falkenberg, American lawyer
- Karl Falkenberg (1887–1936), German actor
- Kenneth Falkenberg (born 1984), Danish footballer
- Kim Falkenberg (born 1988), German footballer
- Lisa Falkenberg (born 1978), American journalist
- Lise Lyng Falkenberg (born 1962), Danish writer
- Louise Falkenberg (1849–1934), Swedish philanthropist
- Maria Falkenberg, Swedish biochemist
- Mia Falkenberg (born 1983), Danish politician
- Otto Falkenberg (1885–1977), Norwegian sailor
- Paul Falkenberg (1848–1925), German botanist

== See also ==
- Falckenberg, another surname
