= Valkenburg (surname) =

Valkenburg or Van Valkenburg is a Dutch toponymic surname indicating an origin in Valkenburg, Dutch Limburg or Valkenburg, South Holland. The name occurs with or without the tussenvoegsel van and has many spelling variants. People with the name include:

- Diane Valkenburg (born 1984), Dutch speed skater
- Dirk Valkenburg (1675–1721), Dutch landscape, bird and still life painter
- Heidi Valkenburg (born 1980s), Australian actress, artist and writer
- Matthew Valkenburg (died 1649), Dutch-born English baronet
- Patti Valkenburg (born 1958), Dutch media theorist
- Piet Valkenburg (1888–1950), Dutch footballer

Medieval people of the Land of Valkenburg, Dutch Limburg

- Beatrix of Valkenburg (c.1254–1277), Queen consort of the Romans 1269–77, daughter of Dirk II
- Dirk I of Valkenburg (c.1190–1227), originally from the Duchy of Cleves
- Dirk II of Valkenburg (1221–1268), son of Dirk I
- Engelbert II of Valkenburg (c.1220–1274), Archbishop of Cologne 1261–71, son of Dirk I
- Goswin I of Valkenburg-Heinsberg (died 1128), builder of Valkenburg Castle
- Goswin II of Valkenburg (c.1105–1168), son of Goswin I
- Johannes von Valkenburg (fl. 1299), Franciscan friar, calligrapher, and miniaturist

Van Valkenburg

- Catharine Van Valkenburg Waite (1829–1913), American author, lawyer and women's suffrage activist
- Catherine E. Van Valkenburg (1880–1961), American concert pianist
- Fred Van Valkenburg (born 1948), American (Montana) Democratic politician
- Mac Van Valkenburg (1921–1997), American electrical engineer
- Schuyler VanValkenburg (born 1982), American (Virginia) Democratic politician
- Zach VanValkenburg (born 1998), American football player
- Richard Van Valkenburg (1823–1912), American pioneer settler in Colorado
- Wade Van Valkenburg (1899–1985), American (Michigan) Republican politician

(Van) Valckenburch / Valckenburgh / Valkenburgh

- Jan Valckenburgh (1623–1667), Dutch civil servant, Director-General of the Dutch Gold Coast 1656–1669
- Margaretha van Valckenburch (1565–1650), Dutch shipowner and Dutch East India Company stockholder
- Franklin Van Valkenburgh (1888 – 1941) Last captain of the USS Arizona
- Van Valkenburgh, a variant spelling extant in the United States

(Van) Valckenborch / Valckenborgh / Valkenborgh

- A Flemish family of landscape painters
  - Marten van Valckenborch (1535–1612), brother of Lucas
    - Frederik van Valckenborch (1566–1623), son of Marten
    - Gillis van Valckenborch (1570–1622), son of Marten
  - Lucas van Valckenborch (c.1537–1597), brother of Marten
- Jan van Valckenborgh (c.1575–1624), Dutch military engineer and fortress builder
- Sam Valkenborgh (born 1975), Belgian pop and rap musician

== See also ==
- Falkenburg (disambiguation), including a surname
- Falckenberg, German surname
- Falkenberg (surname), German surname
