= VanValkenburg =

VanValkenburg is a surname. Notable people with the surname include:

- Schuyler VanValkenburg (born 1982), American teacher and politician
- Zach VanValkenburg (born 1998), American football player

== See also ==
- Valkenburg (surname)
- Van Valkenburgh
