= Robert Corn =

Robert Corn could refer to:

- Rob Corn, American television producer
- Robert Corn-Revere (born 1954), American attorney
