= Van Valkenburgh =

Van Valkenburgh or Van Valkenburg is a Dutch toponymic surname indicating an origin in Valkenburg, Dutch Limburg. Notable people with the surname include:

- Arba Seymour Van Valkenburgh (1862–1944), American judge
- Blaire Van Valkenburgh (born 1952), American paleontologist
- Deborah Van Valkenburgh (born 1952), American actress
- Dennis van Valkenburgh (born 1944), American sprint canoer
- Elizabeth Van Valkenburgh (1799–1846), American murderer
- Franklin Van Valkenburgh (1888–1941), American naval officer
- Lois Van Valkenburgh (1920–2002), American lobbyist, legislative aide, and activist
- Michael Van Valkenburgh (born 1951), American landscape architect
- Robert Bruce Van Valkenburgh (1821–1888), American politician and Union Army officer
- Alvin Van Valkenburg (1913–1991), American physicist and inventor
- Mac Van Valkenburg (1921–1997), American engineer and academic
- Pete Van Valkenburg (born 1950), American football player

== See also ==
- Valkenburg (surname)
- USS Van Valkenburgh (DD-656), Fletcher-class destroyer of the United States Navy
- Van Valkenburgh-Isbister Farm, historic house in Columbia County, New York, United States
- James G. Van Valkenburgh House, historic house in Columbia County, New York, United States
