= Valkenburg =

Valkenburg means falcon castle in Dutch and can refer to:

- Valkenburg aan de Geul, a town and municipality in the province of Limburg
  - Valkenburg Castle, ruined castle near Valkenburg aan de Geul
- Valkenburg, South Holland, a village in the municipality of Katwijk in the province of South Holland
- Valkenburg Naval Air Base, a former Royal Netherlands Navy air base
- Valkenburg (surname), a Dutch surname
