= Davis Wright Tremaine =

American law firm

Davis Wright Tremaine LLP
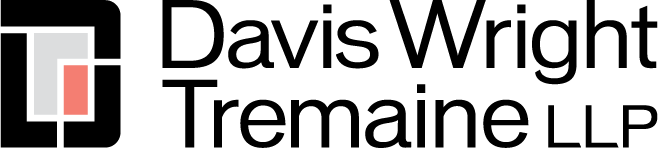
- Headquarters: Seattle, Washington
- No. of offices: 8
- No. of lawyers: 519 (2010)
- No. of employees: 1,274 (2020)
- Major practice areas: Business, litigation
- Key people: Jaime Drozd (Chairperson); Jeffrey P. Gray
- Revenue: $412.8M (2019)
- Date founded: 1944
- Company type: Limited liability partnership
- Website: www.dwt.com

Davis Wright Tremaine LLP is an American business and litigation law firm. Founded in 1944, the firm is a limited liability partnership and employs over 500 lawyers. Davis Wright Tremaine is headquartered in Seattle, Washington, and has offices in seven other cities in the United States.

== History ==
Davis Wright Tremaine was founded in Seattle, Washington, in 1944.

In 1944, founder John Davis outlined the "real aims" of the firm in a series of hand-written notes which included financial independence, "good reputation among fellow men, especially for ability and integrity"; and "enough time off to enjoy living." The firm merged with Wright, Simon, Todd & Schmechel in 1969. In the 1980s, the firm opened offices in Anchorage, Alaska; Washington, D.C.; Bellevue, Washington; and Los Angeles, California. It merged with Ragen, Tremaine, Krieger of Portland, Oregon, in 1990 and added more than 20 lawyers from Heller Ehrman LLP in 2008.

In 1993, the Ministry of Justice of the People's Republic of China selected Davis Wright Tremaine to be the first United States firm to open a law office in Shanghai. The Shanghai office closed in 2018.

Jaime Drozd became the first woman to lead the firm, when appointed managing partner in September 2024.

== Notable cases ==
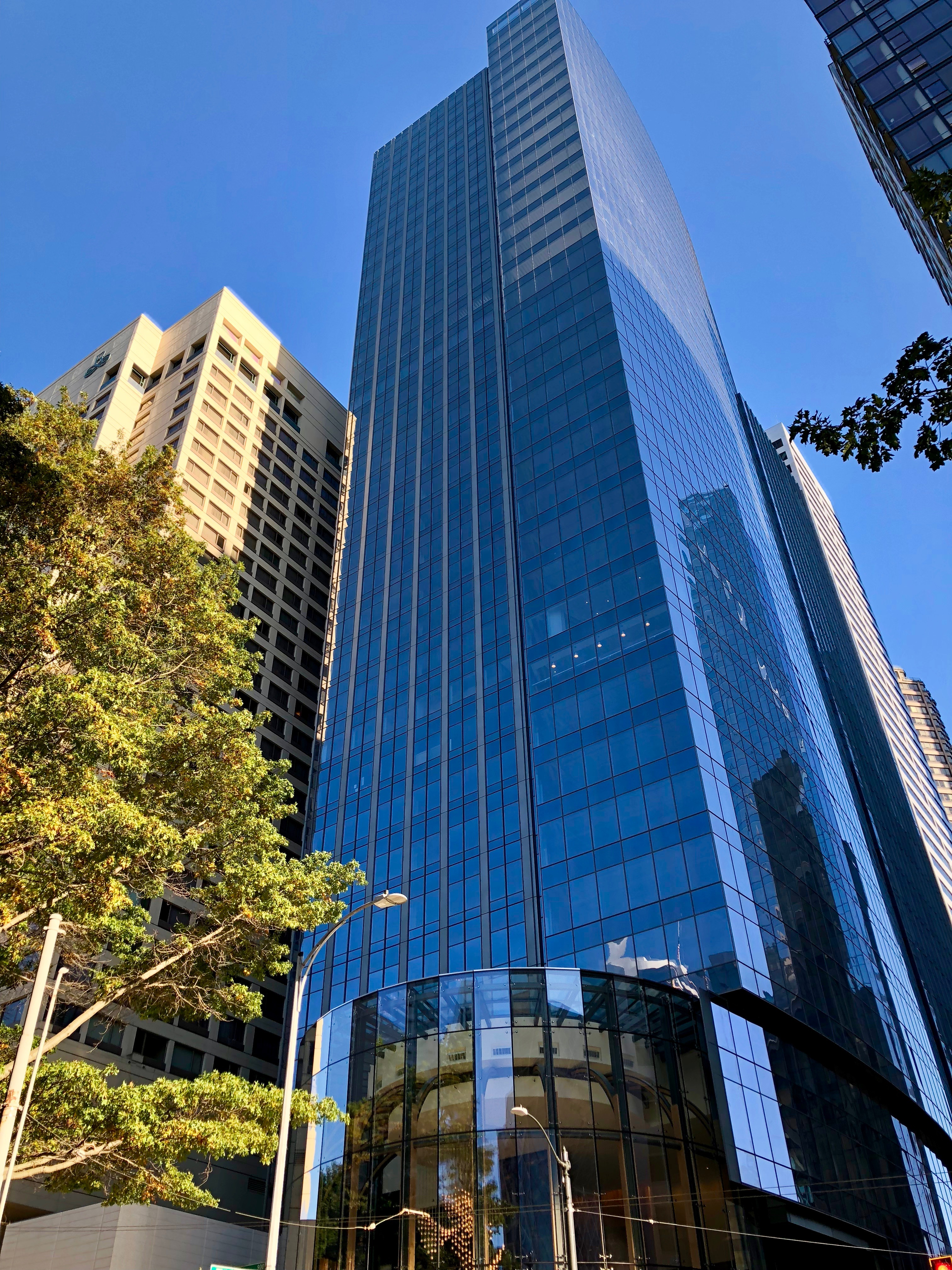
Davis Wright's largest office is headquartered in Seattle, Washington

=== Exxon Valdez oil spill ===
The firm served as lead counsel for 30,000 plaintiffs in consolidated proceedings on behalf of fishermen, processors, Alaska natives, landowners, businesses, and others injured as a result of the spill of 11.8 million gallons of North Slope crude oil into the coastal waters of Alaska by the Exxon Valdez. The plaintiffs were ultimately awarded almost a billion dollars in damages and interest.

=== CBS ===
The firm also successfully represented CBS in its long-running effort to overturn fines imposed by the Federal Communications Commission over the Janet Jackson's "wardrobe malfunction" at the 2004 Super Bowl.

=== TikTok ban ===
In 2023, the firm was hired by TikTok to represent a group of TikTok creators suing to overturn a Montana ban of the platform.

=== Assistance to Guantanamo captives ===
Charles "Cully" Stimson, then Deputy Assistant Secretary of Defense for Detainee Affairs, stirred controversy when he went on record criticizing the patriotism of law firms that allowed employees to assist Guantanamo captives: "corporate CEOs seeing this should ask firms to choose between lucrative retainers and representing terrorists." Stimson's views were widely criticized; the Pentagon disavowed them, and Stimson resigned shortly thereafter.

=== 2009 Sunwest malpractice suit ===
In 2009, investors in retirement home operator Sunwest Management Inc. sued Davis Wright Tremaine, alleging that it played a key role in assisting in its running of a $400 million Ponzi scheme. The lawsuit alleged that Davis Wright Tremaine encouraged individuals and businesses to invest in Sunwest, even though they were aware of the company's financial troubles. Davis Wright Tremaine's involvement in the suit was resolved before trial, when the firm agreed to pay a $30 million settlement to the plaintiffs, one of the largest malpractice settlements by a law firm accused of securities wrongdoing in Oregon history. As of Davis Wright Tremaine's settlement, investor claims remained against Sunwest law firms K&L Gates and Thompson & Knight (now part of Holland & Knight).

== Accolades ==
In 2012, Davis Wright was ranked the 96th largest law firm in the United States by the National Law Journal based on attorney headcount. The firm was ranked No. 114 by gross revenue on the AmLaw 200 that same year.

== Notable alumni ==
- Susan Paradise Baxter, United States district judge of the United States District Court for the Western District of Pennsylvania.
- Robert Corn-Revere
- P. Cameron DeVore
- Stephanie Dorgan, founder of The Crocodile nightclub
- Kai Falkenberg
- Jeffrey L. Fisher, Stanford Law professor
- Gary Locke, former Governor of Washington state and U.S. Secretary of Commerce
- Darleen Ortega, judge on the Oregon Court of Appeals
- Sonja West
