= Sonja West =

American lawyer

Academic background
- Education: University of Iowa (BA); University of Chicago (JD)

Academic work
- Discipline: Law
- Sub-discipline: Constitutional law
- Institutions: University of Alabama; University of Georgia

Sonja R. West is an American legal scholar and writer working as the Otis Brumby Distinguished Professor in First Amendment Law at University of Georgia.

== Education ==
West earned a Bachelor of Arts degree in journalism from the University of Iowa in 1993 and a J.D. degree from the University of Chicago Law School in 1998. As an undergraduate, she wrote for The Daily Iowan.

== Career ==
From 1993 to 1995, West worked as a newspaper columnist and reporter. She served as a law clerk for Judge Dorothy Wright Nelson in 1998 and 1999 and for Justice John Paul Stevens in 1999 and 2000. From 2000 to 2002, West was an associate at Gibson Dunn in Los Angeles. She worked as an associate at Davis Wright Tremaine before joining the University of Alabama School of Law as a Hugo Black Faculty Fellow in 2004. In 2006, West joined the University of Georgia School of Law as an associate professor. She frequently authors op-ed columns on law and the media for The Washington Post, The New York Times, CNN.com, and Slate.
