= Erie, Colorado =

Home rule town in Weld and Boulder counties, Colorado, United States

- Home rule town
- Town of Erie
- Motto(s): Your Future is Here expERIEnce
- Location of the Town of Erie in Weld and Boulder counties, Colorado.
- Coordinates: 40°02′56″N 105°01′20″W
- Country: United States
- State: Colorado
- Counties: Weld; Boulder County
- Settled: 1867
- Incorporated: November 16, 1874

Government
  - Type: Home Rule Town

Area
  - Total: 19.838 sq mi (51.379 km^{2})
  - Land: 19.737 sq mi (51.118 km^{2})
  - Water: 0.101 sq mi (0.261 km^{2})
- Elevation: 5,072 ft (1,546 m)

Population (2020)
  - Total: 30,038
  - Estimate (2025): 40,904
  - Density: 1,521.9/sq mi (587.62/km^{2})
- Time zone: UTC– 07:00 (MST)
  - Summer (DST): UTC– 06:00 (MDT)
- ZIP codes: 80514 & 80516
- Area codes: 303/720/983
- GNIS town ID: 2412599
- FIPS code: 08-24950
- Website: www.erieco.gov

The Town of Erie is a home rule town located in Weld and Boulder counties, Colorado, United States. The town population was 30,038 at the 2020 United States census, a +65.64% increase since the 2010 United States census. At the 2020 census, 17,387 (58%) Erie residents lived in Weld County and 12,651 (42%) lived in Boulder County. Erie is a part of the Denver-Aurora-Greeley, CO Combined Statistical Area and the Front Range Urban Corridor. Erie is the most populous statutory town in Colorado.

Erie is located just west of Interstate 25, with easy access to Interstate 70, Denver International Airport and Colorado's entire Front Range. Erie's Planning Area spans 48 square miles (120 km^{2}), extending from the north side of State Highway 52 south to State Highway 7, and between US 287 on the west and Interstate 25 to the east. Erie is approximately 35 minutes from Denver International Airport, 25 minutes from Denver and 20 minutes from Boulder.

== History ==
In the mid-1860s, coal was discovered in southwestern corner of Weld County in the Territory of Colorado. Erie was originally settled in 1867 and named after Erie, Pennsylvania, the former home of early settler Richard Van Valkenburg.

In 1870, railway service was established by the Denver-Pacific Spur Railroad, and in 1871, the Denver & Boulder Valley Railroad was built through the area, connecting Boulder and Brighton. The Erie, Colorado Territory, post office opened on Jan 24, 1871, and the Town of Erie was incorporated on November 16, 1874. The first board of trustees consisted of five permanent and prominent members of the community; George Meller, Richard Van Valkenburg, John T. Williams, Joseph J. Wharton and John A. Rowe. The first school was established in 1874, with 33 students enrolling.

Although local residents had mined coal for a decade, the first official underground coal mine in Erie opened in 1876; operated by Ira Austin. The railroads facilitated coal transport to the nearby communities and to Denver, helping the town grow quickly. Erie was unique among local coal mining towns because the local coal miners actually owned land or houses in town, instead of setting up temporary camps. Thus it became the greatest coal mining town in Colorado.

The first school building was erected in 1881, with 100 students enrolled. In 1907, the school was replaced by the larger brick Lincoln School, which soon became inadequate due to the town's growth, and four new rooms had to be added in 1920. The over crowding was alleviated in 1929, with the construction of the new high school. Eventually, the Lincoln School was abandoned all together, and a new elementary school was constructed in 1966.

The first church was established in 1883, the Welsh Presbyterian Church, with services conducted in Welsh. By 1888, there was a United Methodist Church and in 1898, the St. Scholasticas Catholic Church was dedicated. In 1884, the first newspaper was founded by Charles D. Bell; called the Erie-Canfield Independent, it continued publishing until 1896. The Erie Herald was established in 1907 and published for far longer than other short lived newspapers, serving the community until 1948.

Erie was one of the only "wet" towns in the area and by 1895, boasted eleven saloons on Briggs Street. This resulted in the need for a jail, constructed in 1876, and a constable. The earliest known constable in Erie was B.C. "Bud" Pitchford. Erie was hit by major floods in 1890, 1921, and 1972. The floods devastated the town, and a dike was built around nearby Coal Creek after the 1972 flood. Erie was also hard-hit by the Panic of 1893 and the Great Depression, the latter of which led to a decline in coal output. Demand for coal dropped after World War II, and most of the mines in the Erie area were closed by 1960, with the Eagle Mine closing in 1978.

== Geography ==
Erie is located in the southwest corner of Weld County and extends west into eastern Boulder County. It is bordered to the south by the city of Broomfield and to the southwest by the city of Lafayette. Interstate 25 forms part of the eastern border of the town, leading south 22 miles (35 km) to downtown Denver and north 41 miles (66 km) to Fort Collins. Erie is served by Exit 232 off I-25.

At the 2020 United States census, the town had a total area of 12,696 acres (51.379 km^{2}) including 64 acres (0.261 km^{2}) of water.

=== Climate ===
Climate data for Erie, Co (1991–2020 precipitation normals)Elevation: 5,111 feet (1,558 metres). Lat: 40.0486° N Lon: 105.0333° W
Month	Jan	Feb	Mar	Apr	May	Jun	Jul	Aug	Sep	Oct	Nov	Dec	Year
Average precipitation inches	0.57	0.61	1.57	1.89	2.60	1.58	1.80	1.44	1.60	1.21	0.77	0.53	16.17
Average precipitation mm	14	15	40	48	66	40	46	37	41	31	20	13	411
Source: NOAA

== Demographics ==
Historical population
Census	Pop.	Note	%±
1880	358		—
1890	662		84.9%
1900	697		5.3%
1910	596		−14.5%
1920	697		16.9%
1930	930		33.4%
1940	1,019		9.6%
1950	937		−8.0%
1960	875		−6.6%
1970	1,090		24.6%
1980	1,254		15.0%
1990	1,258		0.3%
2000	6,291		400.1%
2010	18,135		188.3%
2020	30,038		65.6%
2025 (est.)	40,904	▲	36.2%
U.S. Decennial Census

=== 2020 census ===
As of the 2020 census, Erie had a population of 30,038. The median age was 37.4 years. 29.8% of residents were under the age of 18 and 10.5% of residents were 65 years of age or older. For every 100 females there were 98.1 males, and for every 100 females age 18 and over there were 95.6 males age 18 and over.

99.2% of residents lived in urban areas, while 0.8% lived in rural areas.

There were 10,047 households in Erie, of which 48.1% had children under the age of 18 living in them. Of all households, 70.4% were married-couple households, 9.9% were households with a male householder and no spouse or partner present, and 14.9% were households with a female householder and no spouse or partner present. About 13.5% of all households were made up of individuals and 4.9% had someone living alone who was 65 years of age or older.

There were 10,332 housing units, of which 2.8% were vacant. The homeowner vacancy rate was 1.1% and the rental vacancy rate was 4.1%.

Racial composition as of the 2020 census
Race	Number	Percent
White	24,255	80.7%
Black or African American	258	0.9%
American Indian and Alaska Native	109	0.4%
Asian	1,649	5.5%
Native Hawaiian and Other Pacific Islander	30	0.1%
Some other race	649	2.2%
Two or more races	3,088	10.3%
Hispanic or Latino (of any race)	3,068	10.2%

=== 2010 census ===
As of the 2010 Census there were 18,186 people in the Town of Erie.

=== Demographic estimates ===
According to the Town of Erie Community Development Department, the average household size was 2.91.

Population age distribution
Under 5 years	5–9	10–14	15–19	20–24	25–29	30–34	35–39	40–44	45–49	50–54	55–59	60–64	65–69	70–74	75–79	80–84	85 and older
9.6%	10.3%	7.4%	5.4%	2.7%	4.9%	8.1%	10.4%	9.8%	8.5%	7.25%	5.5%	4.5%	2.5%	1.4%	0.9%	0.5%	0.35%

=== Income and poverty ===
The median income for a household in the town was $99,804, and the median income for a family was $108,058. The per capita income for the town was $38,965.

== Government ==
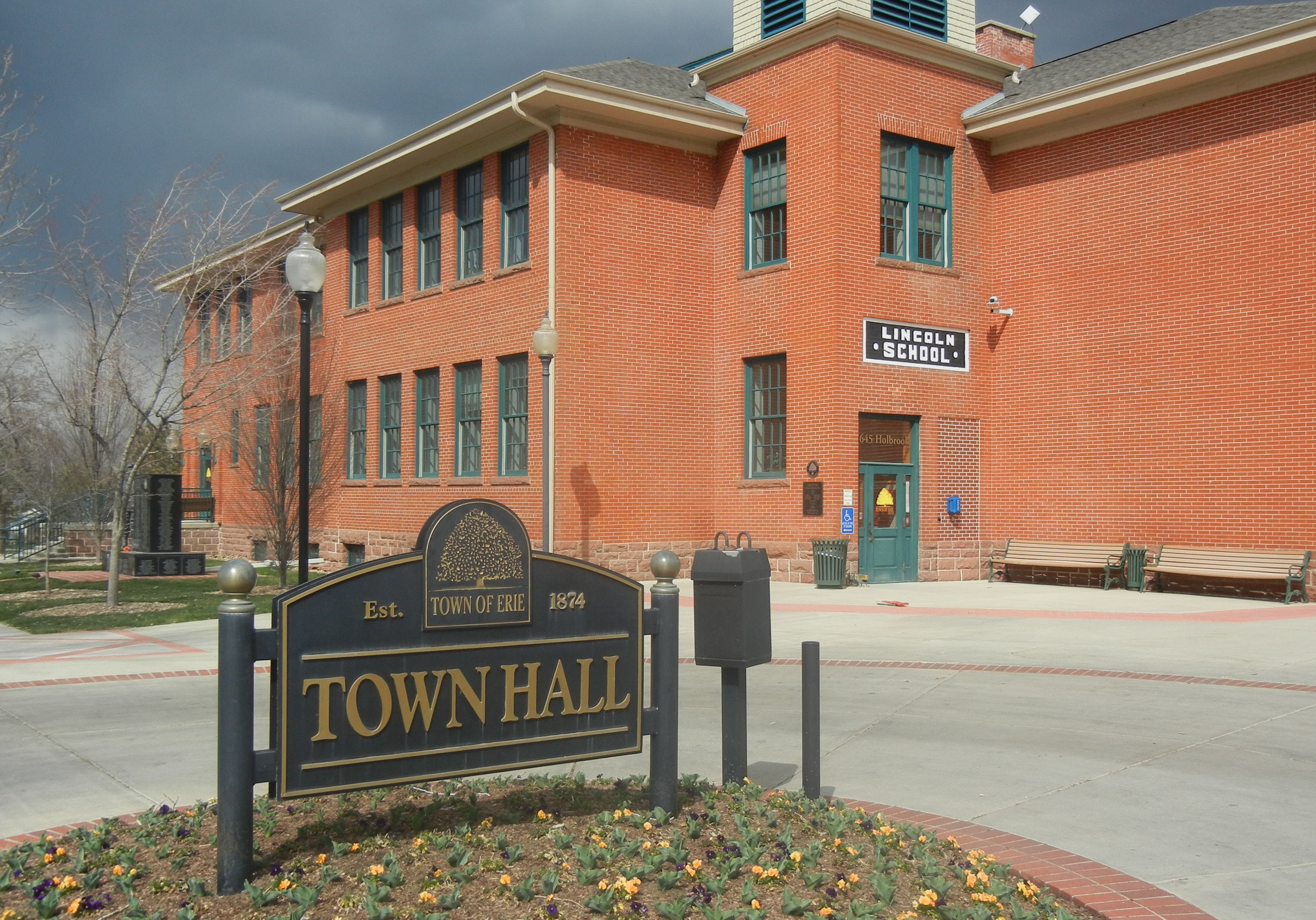
Town Hall of Erie, Colorado

The Town Council serves as the legislative and governing body of the town of Erie and is responsible for establishing town policies and goals. The council has the authority to adopt laws, ordinances, and resolutions as needed to conduct the business of the town, and by ordinance may enter into contracts or intergovernmental agreements to furnish, receive services, or to provide for cooperative service delivery.

Appointed by and serving at the pleasure of the Town Council, the Town Manager is the chief operating and administrative officer of the town and is responsible for providing professional leadership in the administration and execution of policies and objectives formulated by the council.

Erie Municipal Airport (EIK) is owned and operated by the Town of Erie and is located on Colorado Highway 7, a little over three miles west of Interstate 25. The main runway is paved concrete and 4,700 feet (1,400 m) long.

== Arts and culture ==
The Art Center of Erie (known as the A.C.E.) at 625 Pierce Street in Old Town Erie is open for visual and performing arts programs and is operated by the Arts Coalition of Erie. Classes and events are held year round at the site (an old children's library owned by the Town of Erie) leased by the Arts Coalition of Erie.

== Transport ==
The town has an airport, the Erie Municipal Airport. I-25 to the east, E470 to the south, State Highway 7, and State Highway 52 are the major roads for transportation through Erie.

== See also ==
- Denver-Aurora-Greeley, CO Combined Statistical Area
- Front Range Urban Corridor
