= P. Cameron DeVore =

American lawyer

- Born: April 25, 1932; Great Falls, Montana
- Died: October 26, 2008 (aged 76); Lopez Island, Washington
- Education: Harvard Law School
- Occupation: Lawyer

P. Cameron DeVore (April 25, 1932 – October 26, 2008) was an American attorney who was an expert in the First Amendment to the United States Constitution who specialized in representing news companies in cases that involved issues of freedom of the press.

DeVore was born in Great Falls, Montana on April 25, 1932. His father was a newspaperman who was the editor of the Great Falls Tribune and the Montana Farmer. He grew up in Spokane, Washington. DeVore studied at Yale University, University of Cambridge and Harvard Law School, where he received his law degree in 1961. After graduating from law school, he moved to Seattle, Washington and joined the firm of Wright, Simon, Todd & Schmechel (now known as Davis Wright Tremaine) where he developed a practice focusing on First Amendment issues.

Together with Robert D. Sack, a judge on the United States Court of Appeals for the Second Circuit in Manhattan, he coauthored the 1998 book Advertising and Commercial Speech: A First Amendment Guide.

First Amendment cases in which he was involved included Auvil v. CBS 60 Minutes, in which Washington State apple growers claimed that a February 26, 1989 broadcast of the investigative television newsmagazine 60 Minutes had exaggerated the potential dangers of the pesticide Daminozide and its health risks, especially in children. He also participated in Greater New Orleans Broadcasting Association v. United States, which challenged restrictions on casino advertising and challenged the extent to which the government can regulate the media. His brief in Cable News Network v. Berger, which involved media participation in ride-alongs, argued that "media access to many vital law enforcement activities will cease" if the court found against the practice.

The Seattle Times was a client for 30 years. DeVore worked with the paper to vet news articles for the paper, helping it to find ways to publish articles that might have exposed the newspaper to legal action. Former managing editor Alex MacLeod credited DeVore with helping in three of the Pulitzer Prizes won by the paper, noting that we published stories that were above reproach even though there was considerable risk to the paper in terms of our reputation or just plain legal jeopardy in all of these articles.

DeVore died at age 76 on October 26, 2008 at his computer in his home on Lopez Island in Washington. A cause of death had not been determined, though it was apparently of a heart attack. In a self-written obituary, DeVore described his love of fly fishing and claimed in advance to have died of "a surfeit of pâté de foie gras ice cream smothered in huckleberries."
