= Erie Municipal Airport =

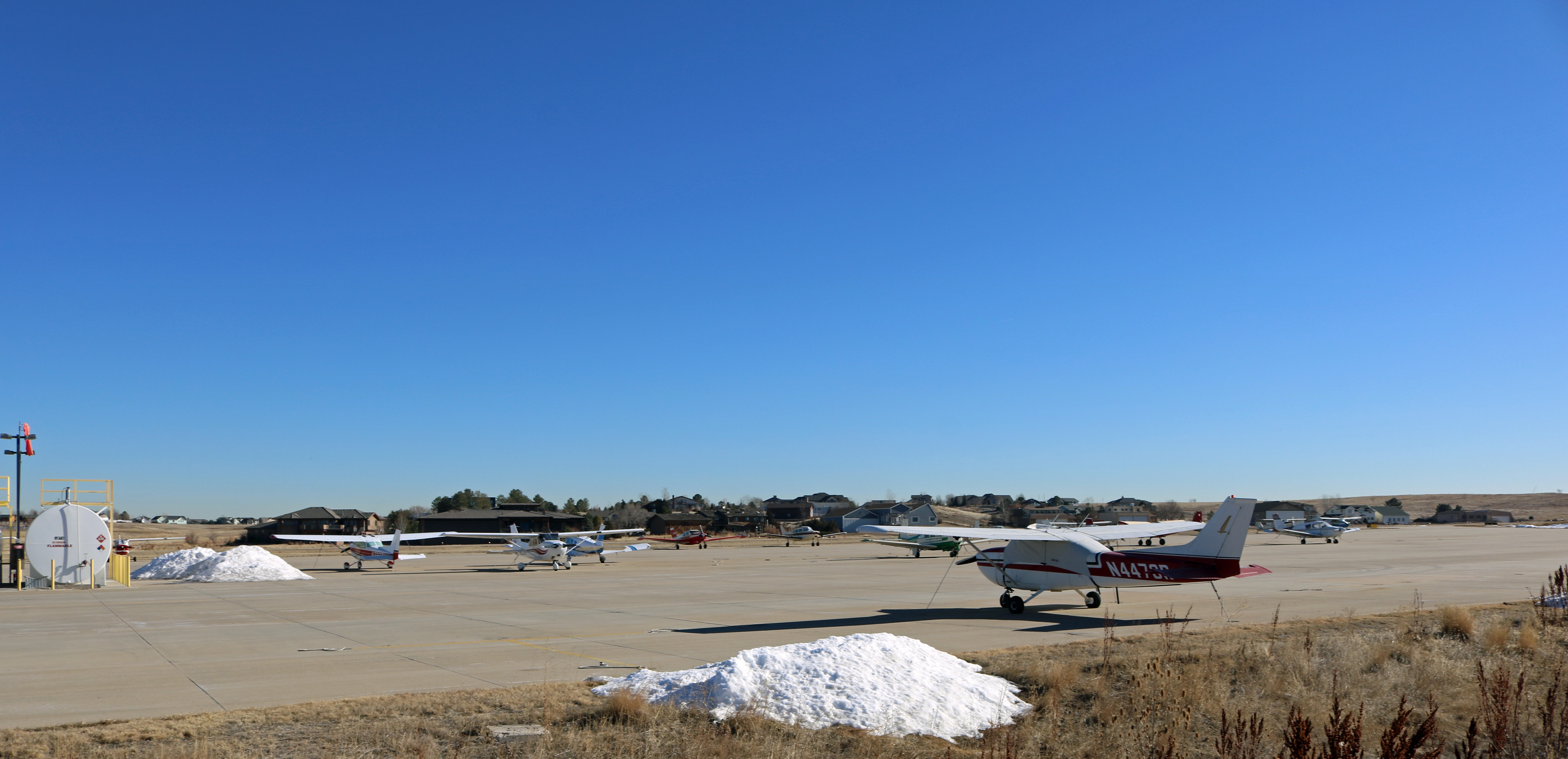
- IATA: none; ICAO: KEIK; FAA LID: EIK

Summary
- Airport type: Public
- Owner: Town of Erie
- Serves: Erie, Colorado
- Elevation AMSL: 5,130 ft (1,560 m)
- Coordinates: 40°00′37″N 105°02′53″W
- Website: www.ErieCO.gov/...

Map
- Location of airport in Colorado

Runways
Direction	Length		Surface
Direction	ft	m	Surface
16/34	4,700	1,433	Concrete

Statistics (2011)
- Aircraft operations: 95,000
- Based aircraft: 188
- Source: Federal Aviation Administration

Erie Municipal Airport (ICAO: KEIK, FAA LID: EIK, formerly 48V) is an airport in Weld County, Colorado, United States. It is owned by the Town of Erie and located three nautical miles (6 km) south of its central business district. This airport was included in the National Plan of Integrated Airport Systems for 2011–2015, which categorized it as a general aviation facility. It was formerly a private airport called Tri-County Airport.

The airport is at the southwestern corner of Weld County, bordering Boulder County to the west and the City and County of Broomfield to the south. This particular part of Broomfield was in Adams County prior to the creation of Broomfield County in 2001. The airport is on the north side of State Highway 7 (Baseline Road) about 4 miles (6.4 km) west of I-25. Adjacent to the airport is the Erie Airpark subdivision, a residential area designed for private-plane commuters.

Although many U.S. airports use the same three-letter location identifier for the FAA and IATA, this airport is assigned EIK by the FAA but has no designation from the IATA (which assigned EIK to Yeysk, Russia).

== Facilities and aircraft ==
Erie Municipal Airport covers an area of 115 acres (47 ha) at an elevation of 5,130 feet (1,564 m) above mean sea level. It has one runway designated 16/34 with a concrete surface measuring 4,700 by 60 feet (1,433 x 18 m). A former runway designed 9/27, now closed, had an asphalt surface measuring 2,250 by 50 feet (686 x 15 m).

For the 12-month period ending December 31, 2011, the airport had 95,000 general aviation aircraft operations, an average of 260 per day. At that time there were 188 aircraft based at this airport: 88% single-engine, 5% multi-engine, 4% helicopter, 3% ultralight, <1% jet, and <1% glider.

== See also ==
- List of airports in Colorado
