= Falckenberg =

Falckenberg is a German surname. Notable people with the surname include:

- Gina Falckenberg (1907–1996), German actress
- Otto Falckenberg (1873–1947), German theatre director, manager, and writer

== See also ==
- Falkenberg (surname)
