= USS Van Valkenburgh =

Fletcher-class destroyer

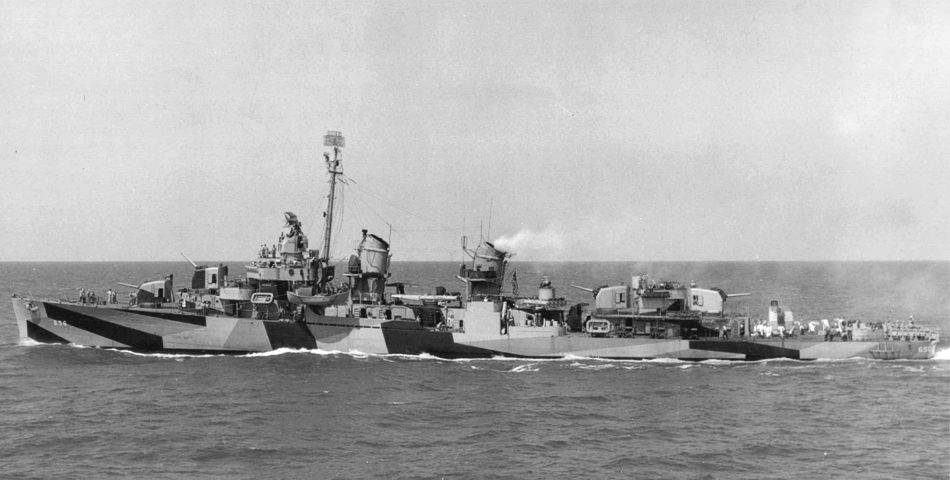
- Van Valkenburgh in 1944

History

United States
- Name: Van Valkenburgh
- Namesake: Franklin Van Valkenburgh
- Builder: Gulf Shipbuilding Corporation, Chickasaw, Alabama
- Laid down: 15 November 1942
- Launched: 19 December 1943
- Commissioned: 2 August 1944
- Decommissioned: 26 February 1954
- Identification: DD-656
- Fate: Transferred to Turkey, 28 February 1967
- Stricken: 1 February 1973

Turkey
- Name: İzmir
- Acquired: 28 February 1967
- Stricken: 1987
- Identification: D 341
- Fate: Scrapped, 1987

General characteristics
- Class & type: Fletcher-class destroyer
- Displacement: 2,050 tons
- Length: 376 ft 6 in (114.76 m)
- Beam: 39 ft 8 in (12.09 m)
- Draft: 13 ft 9 in (4.19 m)
- Propulsion: 60,000 shp (45,000 kW); geared turbines; 2 propellers
- Speed: 38 knots (70 km/h; 44 mph)
- Range: 6,500 nautical miles (12,000 km; 7,500 mi) at 15 knots (28 km/h; 17 mph)
- Complement: 319 officers and enlisted
- Armament: 5 × 5-inch (130 mm)/38 caliber DP guns, 6 × 40 mm AA guns, 7 × 20 mm AA guns, 10 × 21 in (530 mm) torpedo tubes, 6 × depth charge projectors, 2 × depth charge tracks

USS Van Valkenburgh (DD-656) was a Fletcher-class destroyer of the United States Navy, named for Captain Franklin Van Valkenburgh (1888–1941), captain of the battleship Arizona when the Japanese attacked Pearl Harbor.

Van Valkenburgh was laid down on 15 November 1942 at Chickasaw, Alabama, by the Gulf Shipbuilding Corp.; launched on 19 December 1943, sponsored by Mrs. Marguerite Van Valkenburgh, widow of Capt. Van Valkenburgh; and commissioned at the Alabama State Docks, Mobile, Alabama, on 2 August 1944. The ensign hoisted upon commissioning that afternoon was the same that had flown above Arizona's fantail at Pearl Harbor on the morning of 7 December 1941.

== World War II ==
Van Valkenburgh conducted trials and structural firing tests after her initial fitting-out period, and while returning from her gunnery tests on 7 August, received a request for help from the Army tug LT-18. The destroyer altered course and soon came across the disabled tug, with three barges laden with explosives in tow. Van Valkenburgh patrolled on various courses around LT-18, standing by to render assistance if necessary, until help arrived early on the 8 August. Returning to Mobile, the destroyer continued the fitting-out process before getting underway for Bermuda on 20 August.

Van Valkenburgh conducted her shakedown training out of Great Sound, Bermuda, into late September, and on 26 September, she headed for Charleston, South Carolina, and postshakedown availability. Shifting to Hampton Roads soon thereafter, the destroyer conducted training evolutions before meeting with the light cruiser Wilkes-Barre on 22 October.

Van Valkenburgh escorted that new light cruiser to the Panama Canal Zone and transited the Panama Canal on 27 October. At Balboa, Mannert L. Abele joined the two warships, and the three continued on together, bound for San Diego, California. Between 10 and 16 November, they escorted a convoy of troop transports to the Hawaiian Islands, conducting training operations off Lanai, Maui, before arriving at Pearl Harbor on 17 November.

Van Valkenburgh subsequently operated out of Pearl Harbor, engaging in an intensive slate of training activities. She made practice torpedo runs, antiaircraft firings, and shore bombardments—exercises occurring in such an endless parade that it moved a Van Valkenburgh sailor to write that "the real thing could be no more of a strain."

=== Battle of Iwo Jima ===
Van Valkenburgh trained in Hawaiian waters through the end of December 1944, and after a tender availability alongside Yosemite, headed for the western Pacific and her first combat operation, departing Pearl Harbor on 27 January 1945. After touching at Eniwetok en route, the destroyer reached Saipan in the Mariana Islands, where dress rehearsals were held for the landings slated to take place on Iwo Jima in the Volcano Islands. After two days of exercises at Saipan, the fleet sortied for Iwo Jima.

The morning of 19 February dawned gray and wet as the force reached their objective. Van Valkenburgh soon commenced her patrols as part of the three-deep screen around the unloading transports and took her turn at firing gunfire support for the marines ashore. For a week off Iwo, the destroyer alternately screened, escorted, and bombarded.

As transports and freighters unloaded their holds and disembarked their mottle-garbed marines, Van Valkenburgh received orders to escort a group of empty ships back to the Marianas. After shepherding a group to Saipan, Van Valkenburgh returned to Iwo Jima at noon on 3 March. Five days later, she made another trip to Saipan, returning on 18 March to resume screening duties as escort for an amphibious group.

=== Battle of Okinawa ===
After joining that unit, Van Valkenburgh participated in landing rehearsals and exercises on neighboring Tinian and learned that the destination for that group was Okinawa, in the Ryūkyū chain, only 350 miles (560 km) from the enemy's homeland. On 27 March, as part of Task Group 51.2, Van Valkenburgh sailed for her second combat operation.

Van Valkenburgh's group was ordered to feint a landing on the southwest coast of the island to draw off the Japanese defenders, while the main force approached from the west. On the morning of 1 April, while the "Demonstration Group" gathered off the southern beaches, the 6th Army and several marine units splashed ashore on the western side of the island.

"While opposition on land was slow in gathering", wrote Van Valkenburgh's ship's historian, "air opposition was immediate." As the destroyer made her sweep close inshore, a kamikaze attacked LST-884, a ship loaded with ammunition and an embarked detachment of marines. Fortunately, the plane carried no bomb, but holed the ship near the waterline forward, starting fires in the double bottom. Van Valkenburgh stood by LST-884 for eight hours, sending the stricken ship a fire-and-rescue party and fire-fighting equipment under the command of Lt. Comdr. W. Brown (attached to the staff of Capt. W. D. Chandler, screen commander embarked in Van Valkenburgh) to aid in fighting the blazes. Due in large part to the work of Brown's party, the fires were extinguished, and in spite of an initially dangerous starboard list, LST-884 reached Kerama Retto under tow. Three officers and 15 enlisted men from the destroyer received decorations, the highest being Silver Stars to Lt. Comdr. Brown and Lt. J. D. McCormich, USNR.

On 4 April, Van Valkenburgh retired almost 100 miles (160 km) to the east of Okinawa with the feint group, whose maneuvers had accomplished their purpose. That group remained as a floating reserve, occasionally detaching transports to disembark their needed troops and marines on Okinawa, until they sailed back to the Marianas, reaching Saipan on 15 April. Four days later, Van Valkenburgh returned to Okinawa and spent the initial part of that tour in the inner screen, patrolling the transport area just off the beach. "The first night ...", the destroyer's commanding officer recounted, "... we had 18 raids and not one of them turned out to be friendly."

As Van Valkenburgh subsequently entered the anchorage at Kerama Retto, a group of small, rocky islands 15 miles (24 km) off the southwestern coast of Okinawa, her men saw the after-effects of other ships' encounters with the "Special Attack Corps", or, the kamikaze. After seeing the devastation wrought by the suicide planes, Van Valkenburgh headed out to report and relieve J. William Ditter on radar picket station 14, as support ship to Wickes. The radar picket was 72 miles (116 km) to the northwest of Okinawa, and was in the words of Van Valkenburgh's commanding officer, "more nearly in the direction of Japan than anywhere else." The proximity to Japanese air bases soon became evident. Within six hours of her assuming station, the local combat air patrol (CAP), controlled by Wickes, had shot down 21 planes. Van Valkenburgh herself accounted for another and assisted in destroying a second. Van Valkenburgh also went to the aid of a second kamikaze victim, LCS-15, which was hit by a flaming suicide plane and sank immediately. The destroyer picked up the ship's survivors, and her doctor, assisted by his pharmacist's mates, worked into the wee hours of the morning on the wounded, some of them badly burned.

Over half of the following 63 days the destroyer spent in Okinawan waters were spent on one of the 15 stations surrounding the island itself. The radar picket ships not only provided an early warning of the approach of enemy aircraft or surface units, but also drew fire. The Japanese concentrated their kamikaze attacks on the picket line of destroyers and smaller units such as LCIs and LCSs. During those weeks, no one rested. Few, if any, of the crew even bothered to undress when attempting sleep. Most slept fully clothed, awaiting the general quarters alarm. Van Valkenburgh experienced at least two general quarters alarms per night, often four or five times between 21:00 and dawn. As soon as it was light, Corsairs of the 2nd Marine Aircraft Wing based ashore reported for duty on each station, joining with carrier-based aircraft to form the CAP.

On 28 April, within a week of her rescue of the survivors of LCS-15, Van Valkenburgh made her third "Good Samaritan" trip. Twiggs and Daly, on RP-1, drew the ire of a determined group of suiciders. Daly suffered heavy casualties when a kamikaze, plummeting downward, exploded just before it was about to crash the bridge on the port side. Among those killed by the shrapnel and flying debris was the ship's doctor. Van Valkenburgh went alongside Daly and transferred her doctor, Lt. M. E. Smale, to her stricken sister ship, along with Pharmacist's Mate 3d Class Charles B. Reed, to attend the wounded. Since neither Daly nor the other damaged ship required any further assistance, Van Valkenburgh returned to her station and later embarked Doctor Smale and Pharmacist's Mate Reed at Kerama Retto.

Between her tours on the radar picket stations, Van Valkenburgh received upkeep back at Kerama Retto and conducted one shore-bombardment mission. It was a one-night assignment at Buckner Bay, where she blasted pockets of Japanese resistance on the southern tip of Okinawa. The next day, however, she steamed back to the picket line.

The busiest time for Van Valkenburgh came on the evening of 17 May, when in company with Douglas H. Fox and a group of four LCIs, she was on patrol on RP-9. The CAP had just returned to base, and the group wondered when they could secure from the evening alert when suddenly the word came: "Several planes approaching from the west—very low—on the deck." Over the next 30 minutes, a "melee" took place. "Apparently", Van Valkenburgh's commanding officer recalled, "we were marked for 'liquidation' that night as RP-10 had been on the night of the sinking of the Little." With "everybody for himself", Van Valkenburgh twisted and turned, maneuvering while firing with every gun that could be brought to bear. At one point, five blips appeared on the radar screen within a 4-mile (6.4 km) radius.

Two Japanese planes splashed—victims of Van Valkenburgh's direct fire—one only 50 yards (46 m) off the fantail. Douglas H. Fox splashed two more, and the pair of destroyers teamed up for a fifth kill. Unfortunately for Douglas H. Fox, one kamikaze found its mark, crashing that destroyer's forward gun mount. Van Valkenburgh closed on her stricken sister and rendered what aid she could. While thus engaged, she diverted her attention long enough to lay down a barrage to discourage a seventh Japanese pilot "who appeared to be calculating his chances in on the attractive target of the two slow-moving destroyers." At a range of 12 miles (19 km), the plane suddenly disappeared from the radar screen, and Van Valkenburgh claimed that her antiaircraft fire had scored again. After assisting Douglas H. Fox, Van Valkenburgh patrolled the area to search for possible missing men. The night prowl proved fruitless, but the ship was later relieved to hear that only one man of the stricken destroyer's complement remained unaccounted for.

Subsequently, Van Valkenburgh was deployed to RP-16, in company with Robert H. Smith, and spent a relatively quiet patrol until her radar picked up the approach of Shubrick, en route to relieve Robert H. Smith. While Shubrick was still some 10 miles (16 km) away and as Van Valkenburgh was about to secure from general quarters, the latter's radar picked up two low-flying bogies, 10 miles to the north and closing. Van Valkenburgh and Robert H. Smith cleared for action, but the pair of planes turned and headed for the newcomer, Shubrick. Van Valkenburgh passed a warning to her sister ship, but too late. At 00:10 on 29 May, one of the two enemy aircraft crashed Shubrick astern. Van Valkenburgh's lookouts saw the splash of fire in the predawn darkness and heard the "crump" of the explosion.

Communicating her intentions to Robert H. Smith, Van Valkenburgh veered off and headed for her damaged sister. She arrived to find that the kamikaze had blown a 30-foot (9.1 m) hole in the starboard side, and one of the stricken destroyer's own depth charges had exploded, causing further damage. With the situation looking grim, Van Valkenburgh came alongside at 01:13, taking on board survivors—some of whom had been badly wounded. "Gear of all types was carried, dumped, and hurled across from the sinking destroyer", as she transferred classified material and all unnecessary personnel. Again, Van Valkenburgh's Doctor Smale transformed the wardroom into a dressing station to minister to the casualties. "Once more our decks and passageways bore the stretchers of the dead and dying", wrote Van Valkenburgh's commanding officer. In the wardroom, "plasma flowed in life-giving torrents." With flooding controlled and fires extinguished, Shubrick remained doggedly afloat. ATR-9 soon arrived on the scene and towed the crippled destroyer to Kerama Retto. Van Valkenburgh had performed "Good Samaritan" duty for the fourth time.

The attacks, however, did not cease. On the evening of 5 June, while on RP-11 in company with Cassin Young and Smalley, Van Valkenburgh came under a concentrated torpedo attack. About dusk on that day, four or five planes closed, low from the west and heavy with bombs and torpedoes. Van Valkenburgh's 40-millimeter Bofors batteries hurled out shell after shell, peppering the skies with flak. One bomber launched its torpedo—the "fish" passing 100 yards (91 m) ahead of the ship—but did not emerge from the attack. The destroyer's 40 mm barrage slapped it into the sea. The second torpedo dropped, aimed in Van Valkenburgh's direction, but passed astern.

Following that last incident, Van Valkenburgh's sailors noted a definite slackening in the Japanese attacks. The massive B-29 raids on the home islands, together with the attrition caused by steady pounding by American carrier-based air power, had slowed the Japanese down considerably.

=== Final operations ===
Late on 24 June, Van Valkenburgh finally left the forward areas, bound for the Philippines. For the ensuing fortnight, the ship rested at San Pedro Bay, Leyte, enjoying a breather from the hectic pace of operations that had lasted for over two months.

Early in July, she put to sea as part of a surface force consisting of the new large cruisers Alaska and Guam, four light cruisers, and seven destroyers. Assigned to operate along the China coast between Formosa and Shanghai, the force searched for any signs of Japanese surface ship activity in that area, but found no opposition of any kind. Ready for anything when they put to sea, Van Valkenburgh's sailors found the situation almost anticlimactic. As one member of the crew wrote: "Our tension relaxed considerably and our sweep took on the aspect of tactical maneuvers in Chesapeake Bay."

Neither ships nor planes inquired or resisted the task force's progress, as the ships set a course back to Okinawa after a five-day patrol, 200 miles (320 km) off Shanghai. The task force commander offered consoling thoughts: "If the lack of action is a disappointment, at least we have the satisfaction of knowing that the East China Sea was under 'our control.'"

Subsequently, returning to Buckner Bay, Van Valkenburgh lay at anchor there, when at 21:00 on 10 August 1945, "all Hell broke loose." Something akin to a Fourth of July celebration occurred, as some 150 warships threw everything they had—searchlights; tracers; red, white, and green flares; and star shell—into a 15-minute celebration that commemorated the word that the Japanese were entertaining thoughts of surrender. The demonstration subsided as quickly as it had formed, and darkness again descended upon Buckner Bay. Two days later, however, the torpedoing of Pennsylvania brought home the fact that war was still very much "on". Until after 15 August, the signal "cease present operations" could not be hoisted, indicating that the war was over at last.

On 7 September, Van Valkenburgh stood out of Buckner Bay in company with Anthony, Wadsworth, Beale, and Ammen, as screen for the escort carriers Suwannee, Chenango, Cape Gloucester, and Birmingham, bound for Japan and occupation duty in the erstwhile enemy's waters. For the week that followed, the group operated off the coast of Kyūshū, southwest of Nagasaki, Japan, while aircraft from the carriers patrolled the island and coast and assisted in locating mines in the clearance operations, paving the way for entry into the harbor at Nagasaki.

On 15 September, as Van Valkenburgh steamed into Nagasaki Harbor, every available vantage point topside was occupied by men silently taking in the incredible devastation wrought by the atomic bomb dropped on the city over a month before. During her week there, Van Valkenburgh stood by as Allied prisoners of war were taken on board the hospital ship Haven, which lay moored at the port's principal dock.

For the next six weeks, Van Valkenburgh remained in Japanese waters, carrying out two courier trips to Wakayama, Honshū, Japan, on the Inland Sea. Finally, her tour of duty in the Far East completed, Van Valkenburgh sailed for the United States on 17 November, departing Sasebo on that day, bound for the West Coast. Reaching San Diego on 6 December—via Midway and Pearl Harbor—the destroyer soon pushed on for the East Coast, transiting the Panama Canal on 18 and 19 December. Making port at Charleston, South Carolina, two days before Christmas of 1945, Van Valkenburgh was decommissioned and placed in reserve on 12 April 1946.

=== 1950–1954 ===
On 31 August 1950, some two months after North Korea invaded South Korea, the Navy ordered Van Valkenburgh's activation in light of the recently erupting Far Eastern crisis. Accordingly, Van Valkenburgh was recommissioned at Charleston on 8 March 1951. She trained off the Virginia Capes and north along the coast to Nova Scotian waters, as well as into the Caribbean, from Guantanamo Bay to Culebra, Puerto Rico.

Van Valkenburgh subsequently departed Norfolk on 2 May, transited the Panama Canal between 20 and 22 May, and reached Yokosuka, Japan, on 17 June, via San Diego, Pearl Harbor, and Midway.

Leaving Yokosuka in her wake on 22 June, Van Valkenburgh spent the next 36 days at sea with Task Force 77, screening the fast carriers as they launched air strikes against Communist forces ashore. Putting into Sasebo at the end of July, the destroyer spent a brief period in port before she got underway on 1 August for the "bomb line".

Van Valkenburgh relieved Brown as Task Element 95.28 shortly after noon on 3 August. Operating under the control of Commander, Task Group 95.2 Commander, East Coast Blockading and Patrol Group, the destroyer commenced a period of operations in support of the I Corps, Republic of Korea (ROK) Army. No sooner had she actually commenced those activities, than she received a call for indirect fire. She expended 20 rounds of 5-inch shells against enemy positions before conducting night inshore patrol from Kojo, south to the bomb line.

Over the ensuing days, Van Valkenburgh expended over 2,400 rounds of ammunition against a variety of targets—ranging from houses to bunkers, artillery positions to sampans, trenches to tents and supply dumps, frequently using air spotters. She conducted her patrol operations in company with ROK YMS-5H. On one occasion—9 August 1952—Van Valkenburgh dueled with a communist shore battery. Taking 10 rounds of 76-millimeter projectiles from Suwan Dan, the destroyer returned immediate counterbattery and slow destructive fire, using airspot, expending 51 rounds of 5-inch projectiles.

After being relieved by Tingey, Van Valkenburgh operated in the Far East into the autumn. She visited the Japanese ports of Yokosuka, Hakodate, and Ominato and touched at Keelung, Formosa, before she patrolled the Formosa Strait. She then visited Kaohsiung, Formosa, and Hong Kong, but returned to the Formosa Strait for a second stint of patrol duty.

Then, after a week's upkeep at Subic Bay, from 10 to 17 October, Van Valkenburgh headed for the United States. She completed a circumnavigation of the globe, sailing via Singapore, Federated Malay States; Colombo, Ceylon; Ras Tanura, Aden; the Suez Canal—transiting that waterway on 14 November; Naples and Genoa, Italy; Cannes, France; and Gibraltar; reaching Norfolk, Virginia, on 12 December.

After remaining at Norfolk through the Christmas and New Year's holidays, Van Valkenburgh operated in the Vieques, Puerto Rico, area in March 1953. She then returned to Norfolk, where she was placed in reserve, but still in commission, in August 1953. Taken to Philadelphia, Pennsylvania, later that same month, Van Valkenburgh remained in reserve at that port until she was decommissioned on 26 February 1954.

== TCG İzmir (D 341) ==
Transferred on loan to the government of Turkey on 28 February 1967, Van Valkenburgh became TCG İzmir (D 341) and operated with the Turkish Navy into the early 1970s. Struck from the U.S. Navy List on 1 February 1973, the destroyer was returned to the United States on 15 February, but was simultaneously sold to Turkey.

İzmir was stricken and broken up for scrap in 1987.

== Awards ==
Van Valkenburgh won the Navy Unit Commendation for her service off Okinawa, was awarded three battle stars for her World War II duty, and received one for Korean War operations.
