= Louise Falkenberg =

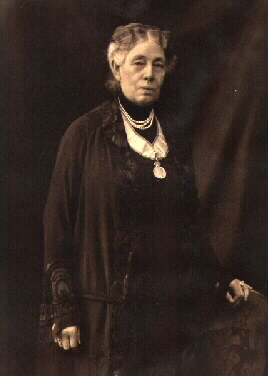
Louise Falkenberg (c. 1930)

Sara Louise Antoinette Falkenberg née Ekman (1849–1934) was a Swedish baroness or freiherrinna who is remembered for her extensive philanthropic activities. These covered a home for sick children, the care of foster children after the First World War, and support for cultural and educational institutions, including the University of Gothenburg. For 30 years, she chaired the board of Crown Princess Louisa's Children's Hospital (Kronprinsessan Lovisas vårdanstalt för sjuka barn).

== Biography ==
Born on 15 February 1849 in Gothenburg, Sara Louise Antoinette Ekman was the only daughter of Consul Johan Oscar Ekman (1812–1907) and Baroness Louise Carolina von Düben (1822–1861). When her mother died in 1861 she was only 12 and her younger brother Conrad Joachim (1851–1875) only 10. As a result, she became very close to her father, sharing his interests.

On 20 May 1869, she married Baron Johan Axel Casimir Löwen (1836–1876). Her father bought them the Skedevi residence in Södermanland but Löwen died in 1876 without fathering any children. She met her recently widowed Skedevi neighbour, Baron Claes August Falkenberg (1828–1892), during the midsummer festivities. After their wedding in May 1883, the baron moved to live with her in Skedevi. It was a happy marriage until their daughter Augusta died when just four years old in 1887 and Claes August himself died in 1892, leaving Louise a widow for the second time.

Following in her father's footsteps, Louise Falkenberg turned to charity, first establishing a school in Skedevi in memory of her daughter and then a home for terminally ill children in nearby Flen. She provided assistance for those who suffered under the Finnish Civil War in 1918 and after the end of the First World War, she cared for some 50 foster children, mainly from Germany and Austria. For 30 years, she headed the board of Princess Louisa's Children's Hospital. Falkenberg also provided support for boys' clubs, handicraft associations and for the Sigtuna Foundation. The year before she died, she made a donation of SEK 100,000 to the University of Gothenburg. This was used to establish a foundation which in 1914 had funds of SEK 2 million. In her will, she provided substantial financial support for various hospitals, for the Swedish cancer society and for the University of Uppsala.

She was awarded the Illis quorum in 1924.

Louise Falkenberg died in Stockholm on 16 May 1934.
