= Kai Falkenberg =

American lawyer

Kai Falkenberg is an American lawyer, law professor and media executive, currently the general counsel at G/O Media. Previously, she served as Acting Commissioner and First Deputy Commissioner of the Mayor's Office of Media & Entertainment in New York City and was the editorial counsel at Forbes and a media and entertainment lawyer in private practice. She is a lecturer in law at Columbia Law School where she created and teaches the nation's first class on the Law and Regulation of Social Media.

== Early life and education ==
Falkenberg grew up in Chappaqua, New York and graduated from Dartmouth College where she was a competitive ski racer, a pentathlete and a writer for the college's alumni magazine. She received a J.D. degree from Columbia Law School where she was an editor of the Law Review and a James Kent Scholar.

== Career ==
Falkenberg clerked on the federal appellate court in the District of Columbia and began her legal career at Wachtell, Lipton, Rosen & Katz. She then worked at Davis Wright Tremaine where she specialized in First Amendment litigation and counseled media and entertainment clients including Wenner Media, A&E, Warner Bros., the BBC and the New York Times.

From 2007 to 2014, Falkenberg was the editorial counsel at Forbes, advising on legal issues relating to its print and online content, including its transformation from a traditional publisher to an online contributor platform. She also represented the company in a libel suit brought by Prince Alwaleed regarding his ranking on the Forbes's "Billionaires List" and its reporting that his net worth was inflated.

Falkenberg joined the de Blasio Administration in 2015, first as a senior lawyer for the NYC Department of Consumer Affairs focusing on online consumer fraud. In 2016 she was named the first Deputy Commissioner of the Mayor's Office of Media & Entertainment, leading a 120-person agency that supports NYC's creative sectors and runs NYC Media, the city's network of television and radio stations. In that role, Falkenberg launched initiatives including the Freelancer's Hub, a center providing free resources for independent workers, and One Book One New York, the country's largest community read program, in addition to overseeing the development of programming for NYC Life, the organization's flagship television channel (which has been nominated for 160 New York Emmy Awards, winning 42). Falkenberg also negotiated the deal to bring the Grammys back to New York City after fifteen years.

Falkenberg left the Mayor's Office of Media & Entertainment in 2018 to return to practicing media and entertainment law. In 2019 she joined G/O Media as general counsel. In that position she is the top lawyer for online publications including The Onion, Gizmodo, Jezebel, The Root and Deadspin.

Falkenberg served as President of the board of directors for The Jewish Week. She currently serves on the boards of the Craig Newmark School of Journalism at CUNY and New York City's Open Data Advisory Council, as well as The Gotham Film & Media Institute (formerly the Independent Filmmaker Project (IFP)), the Manhattan Chamber of Commerce, and 70 Faces Media.

== Personal life ==
Falkenberg lives in New York City and is married to former U.S. Secret Service agent Christopher Falkenberg, whom she met while giving blood while both were students at Columbia Law School.
