= Maria Falkenberg =

Swedish biochemist

Maria Falkenberg is a professor of medical biochemistry at the Sahlgrenska Academy of the University of Gothenburg, Sweden. She has made important contributions to understanding how the mitochondrial genome is maintained in health and disease.

== Career ==
Falkenberg received her doctorate from the University of Gothenburg in 2000 for her work on the molecular aspects of DNA replication in Herpes Simplex virus type 1 in the Per Elias group in Gothenburg and the Robert Lehman group at Stanford University. She studied the mechanisms of mitochondrial DNA replication during her postdoctoral fellowship from 2001 to 2003 in the Nils-Göran Larsson laboratory at the Karolinska Institute, where she then established her own group in 2003. She was the first to set up a cell-free system to study human mitochondrial DNA replication. Her research is funded by among others, the European Research Council (ERC), the Swedish Research Council (VR), and the Knut and Alice Wallenberg Foundation (KAW).

== Awards ==
- 2019 Appointed Wallenberg Scholar by the Knut and Alice Wallenberg Foundation (KAW)
- 2017 Election to the Royal Society of Arts and Sciences in Gothenburg (KVVS)
- 2015 Election to the Royal Swedish Academy of Sciences (KVA)
- 2012 The Edlunska Prize
- 2009 Sven och Ebba-Christina Hagbergs Prize in Chemistry
- 2009 The Fernström Prize
- 2008 Research Fellow of the Royal Swedish Academy of Sciences
- 2008 Future Research Leader Award, Swedish Foundation for Strategic Research (SSF)

== Selected publications ==
Copy-choice recombination during mitochondrial L-strand synthesis causes DNA deletions.

Persson Ö, Muthukumar Y, Basu S, Jenninger L, Uhler JP, Berglund AK, McFarland R, Taylor RW, Gustafsson CM, Larsson E, Falkenberg M.

Nat Commun. 2019 Feb 15;10(1):759. doi: 10.1038/s41467-019-08673-5.

Nucleotide pools dictate the identity and frequency of ribonucleotide incorporation in mitochondrial DNA.

Berglund AK, Navarrete C, Engqvist MK, Hoberg E, Szilagyi Z, Taylor RW, Gustafsson CM, Falkenberg M, Clausen AR.

PLoS Genet. 2017 Feb 16;13(2):e1006628. doi: 10.1371/journal.pgen.1006628.

Maintenance and Expression of Mammalian Mitochondrial DNA.

Gustafsson CM, Falkenberg M, Larsson NG.

Annu Rev Biochem. 2016 Jun 2;85:133-60. doi: 10.1146/annurev-biochem-060815-014402.

In vitro-reconstituted nucleoids can block mitochondrial DNA replication and transcription

Géraldine Farge, Majda Mehmedovic, Marian Baclayon, Siet MJL van den Wildenberg, Wouter H Roos, Claes M Gustafsson, Gijs JL Wuite, Maria Falkenberg

Cell Rep. 2014 Jul 10;8(1):66-74. doi: 10.1016/j.celrep.2014.05.046.

In vivo occupancy of mitochondrial single-stranded DNA binding protein supports the strand displacement mode of DNA replication.

Miralles Fusté J, Shi Y, Wanrooij S, Zhu X, Jemt E, Persson Ö, Sabouri N, Gustafsson CM, Falkenberg M.

PLoS Genet. 2014 Dec 4;10(12):e1004832. doi: 10.1371/journal.pgen.1004832.
