= Richard Van Valkenburg =

Personal details
- Born: Richard Jeptha Van Valkenburg; August 16, 1823 Schoharie, New York
- Died: September 8, 1912 (aged 89) Denver, Colorado

Richard Jeptha Van Valkenburg (August 16, 1823 — September 8, 1912) was a Civil War veteran and Episcopal reverend who is notable for being one of the founding pioneers of northern Colorado, namely the town of Erie, Colorado.

== Early life ==
Richard Jeptha Van Valkenburg was born in the town of Schoharie, N.Y., where he lived for only two years before his family moved to Owego, New York, where Van Valkenburg eventually grew up. Despite being able only to attend school in the winter season, Van Valkenburg was very studious and had read the entire Bible by his fourteenth year. In addition to this, Van Valkenburg was also known to have an interest in newspapers, which he regularly saved up for. In 1841 Van Valkenburg became licensed to preach with the Methodist Episcopal Church. Two years later in March 1843, Van Valkenburg became married to Cordelia Briggs. Together the two would have four children; three girls and one boy. In 1850, Van Valkenburg became a member of the Wyoming conference. During this period of time, Van Valkenburg was known to have a talented voice, and was given the nickname “sweet singer of Wyoming."

== American Civil War ==
In 1862, while preaching in Montrose, Pennsylvania, Van Valkenburg received a summons to arms, as it was believed that the Confederate army was planning to attack the city of Harrisburg. Van Valkenburg quickly raised a company of one hundred and eight men, who elected him as their captain. This company served at the front, but were returned home after the Battle of Antietam and relegated to a reserve force. The company was eventually called out again and were stationed in Carlisle, Pennsylvania the night before the Battle of Gettysburg. After this Van Valkenburg volunteered to become a chaplain of the pioneer corps, where he accompanied General Sherman on his march through Georgia. Van Valkenburg became seriously ill and was hospitalized in Atlanta for a period of two months.

== Founding of Erie ==
In 1865 Van Valkenburg received an honorable discharge in Nashville, Tennessee. Van Valkenburg then returned home to Owego for a short period of time, and that April moved to Colorado on account of his worsening health. It was there that he settled in the town now known as Erie, and the house that he built there was the town's first. It was in this house that Van Valkenburg hold Sunday-school to a small number of pupils in his dining room. In Erie Van Valkenburg held many positions and offices, among them a judge, a police magistrate, town postmater, mayor, school board president, and representative to the state legislature from Weld County. Van Valkenburg also notably established the Masonic Erie Lodge and Longmont Lodge, in addition to serving as the Grand Master of the Grand Lodge of Colorado.
