= Kenneth Falkenberg =

Danish footballer (born 1984)

Personal information
- Date of birth: 15 May 1984 (age 42)
- Place of birth: Denmark
- Height: 1.93 m (6 ft 4 in)
- Position: Goalkeeper

Senior career*
Years	Team	Apps	(Gls)
–2001	Kolding B	?	(?)
2002–2008	Kolding FC	142	(0)
2008–2011	Silkeborg IF	25	(0)
2011–2013	FC Fredericia		
- * Club domestic league appearances and goals

Kenneth Falkenberg (born 15 May 1984) is a Danish football goalkeeper.
