= Christopher Falkenberg =

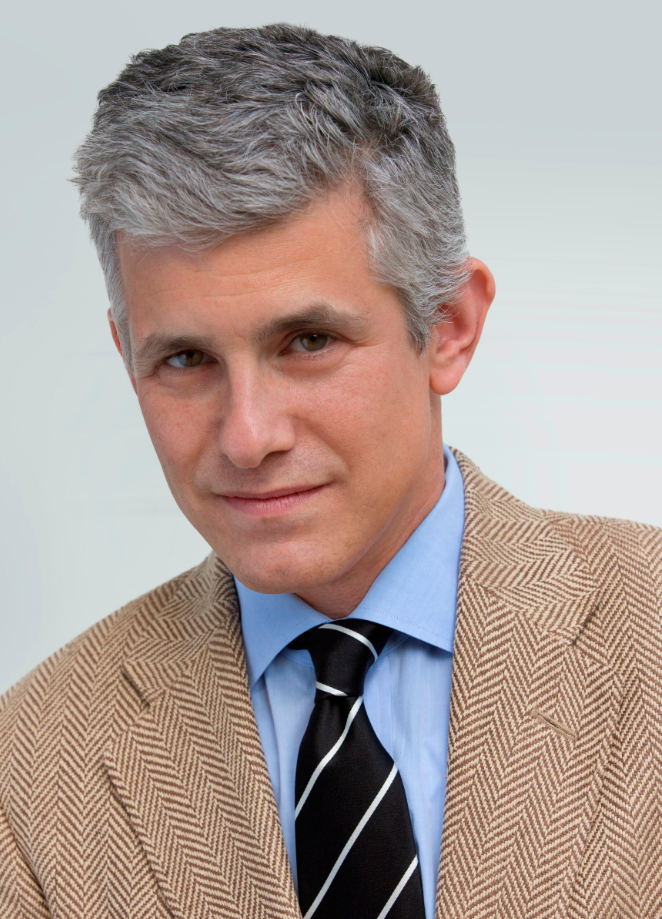
- Christopher Falkenberg, President of Insite Risk Management
- Education: B.A. Kenyon College; J.D. Columbia Law School
- Known for: Founder of Insite Risk Management

Christopher Falkenberg is a security expert and the founder and president of Insite Security, a risk management firm. He is a former Special Agent for the United States Secret Service and litigator at Davis Polk & Wardwell.

Falkenberg worked for the Secret Service Forgery Squad and eventually for the Bank Fraud Squad at the New York Field Office in Manhattan and at JFK Airport from 2000 to 2005. While with the Secret Service, he conducted protective advances for the President and other government officials, both domestically and abroad, as well as for visiting dignitaries. He was also assigned to President Bill Clinton's security detail for the 1992 presidential campaign.

== Early career ==
Upon his graduation from Kenyon College with a bachelor's degree, Falkenberg applied to the Secret Service and was hired to work in the New York Field Office in Manhattan. He led investigations of major fraud cases including U.S. v. Shapiro and U.S. v. Constance Darlene Foster Moore.

After spending five years as a Secret Service Special Agent, Falkenberg attended Columbia Law School where he was a Harlan Fiske Stone scholar. Following graduation, Falkenberg served as a law clerk to John S. Martin Jr. of the United States District Court for the Southern District of New York. He then joined Davis Polk & Wardwell], a New York law firm, as a litigator, where he conducted corporate internal investigations and was involved in civil and criminal matters.

== Insite Risk Management ==
Falkenberg founded Insite in 2002.

== Credentials ==
Among his awards and citations, Falkenberg received the United States Treasury Department’s Special Service Award and was recognized for heroism following the 1993 World Trade Center bombing.

Falkenberg is the co-author (along with Giza Rodick, a Ph.D. candidate in criminology at the State University of New York at Albany) of a white paper entitled “Economy and Crime: Understanding the Real Connection,” as well as "Employer-Provided Security and the Independent Security Study." He also authored a white paper entitled " The Insider Threat: Red Flags and Risk Management Solutions for a New Breed of Criminals".

Falkenberg is an inaugural member of the Trust Advisory Board of Airbnb. He is the former president of the Northeast Chapter of the Association of Threat Assessment Professionals and the former Chairman of the Community Security Subcommittee of the Anti Defamation League. He is also a member of trade groups such as ASIS International, and The International Association of Independent Private Sector Inspectors General.

He holds certifications as a New York City Fire Safety Director, an Emergency Medical Technician and is a licensed private investigator in New York and New Jersey. He is admitted to the New York bar and the bars of the U.S. District Courts in the Southern and Eastern Districts of New York.

== Personal life ==
He is married to entertainment lawyer Kai Falkenberg, whom he met while giving blood while both were students at Columbia Law School.

== Sources ==
- Insite Security Official Website
- Financial Times
- Bloomberg
- The Wall Street Journal
- The Wall Street Journal
- The Wall Street Journal
- Private Asset Management
- The New York Times
- CSO Security and Risk
- Private Wealth
- CSO Security and Risk
- Hodge, Nathan (May 3, 2010). "How Not to Build a Car Bomb (Times Square Edition)". Wired.
- Las Vegas Review Journal
- Town & Country
- Town & Country
- Bloomberg
