= Robert Corn-Revere =

American lawyer

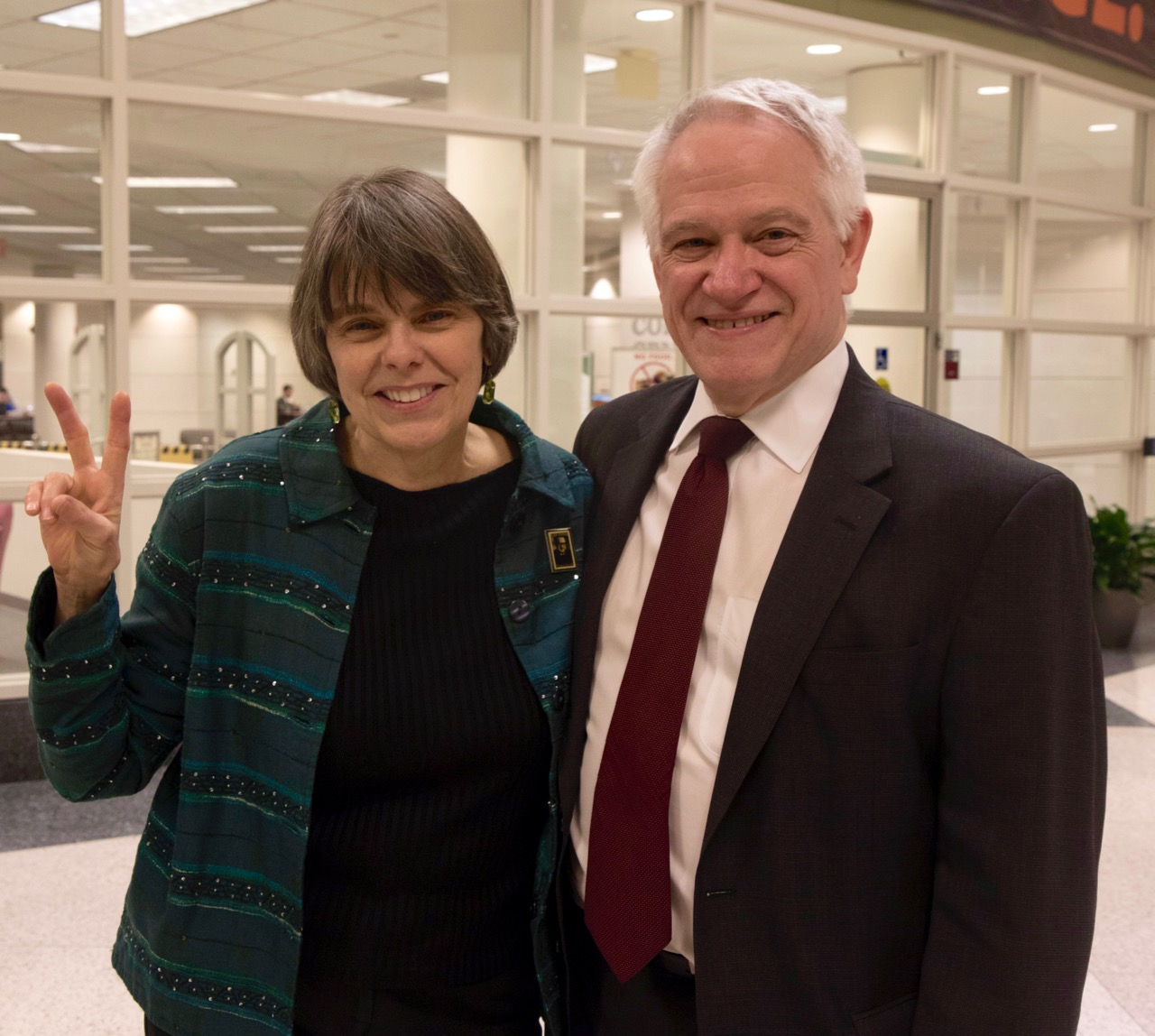
- Corn-Revere with Mary Beth Tinker of Tinker v. Des Moines
- Born: October 15, 1954 (age 71); Mattoon, Illinois
- Education: Eastern Illinois University (BA); University of Massachusetts Amherst (MA); Catholic University of America (JD)
- Occupation: Lawyer/Writer
- Website: Foundation for Individual Rights and Expression; Robert Corn-Revere

Robert L. "Bob" Corn-Revere (born Robert L. Corn, October 15, 1954) is an American First Amendment lawyer. Corn-Revere is the Chief Counsel at the Foundation for Individual Rights and Expression and was formerly a partner at Davis Wright Tremaine LLP in Washington, D.C. He is regularly listed as a leading First Amendment and media law practitioner by The Best Lawyers in America (Woodward/White), SuperLawyers Washington, D.C., and by Chambers USA (Chambers & Partners). Best Lawyers in America named him as Washington, D.C.’s 2017 “Lawyer of the Year” in the areas of First Amendment Law and Litigation – First Amendment. He was again named as Best Lawyers’ “Lawyer of the Year” for First Amendment Law for 2019 and 2021, and in Media Law for 2022. In 2022 he was listed in Washingtonian Magazine's Top Lawyers Hall of Fame for Lifetime Achievement.

He is the author of The Mind of the Censor and the Eye of the Beholder: The First Amendment and the Censor’s Dilemma, published by Cambridge University Press in 2021.

== First Amendment advocacy ==
Corn-Revere has a long history of First Amendment advocacy.

Corn-Revere was legal adviser to FCC Commissioner James H. Quello from 1990 to 1993 and was Chief Counsel while Quello was Interim Chair of the Federal Communications Commission in 1993.

From 1997 to 1999, Corn-Revere served as lead counsel alongside attorneys from People for the American Way for plaintiffs in the Mainstream Loudoun v. Loudoun County Library case in which the court declared public library internet filtering to be unconstitutional. At the same time, Corn-Revere also served a co-counsel in Bernstein v. United States in which the Ninth Circuit Court of Appeals declared software source code to be constitutionally protected by the First Amendment and government regulations, specifically export restrictions on encryption software, to be unconstitutionally vague.

In 2000, Corn-Revere argued United States v. Playboy Entertainment Group on behalf of respondent Playboy Entertainment Group before the Supreme Court of the United States. In a 5–4 decision, the court struck down portions of the Communications Decency Act which required that cable television operators who offered channels "primarily dedicated to sexually-oriented programming" must scramble completely or fully block such material.

Beginning in 2004, Corn-Revere successfully defended CBS Television and Viacom in an FCC proceeding resulting from the Super Bowl XXXVIII halftime show controversy, the so-called "wardrobe malfunction" during the half time show with Janet Jackson and Justin Timberlake. The FCC imposed a then-record fine of $550,000 under its broadcast indecency rules, but the penalty was reversed by the United States Court of Appeals for the Third Circuit. After a second trip to the Third Circuit, where the fine was again struck down, the U.S. Supreme Court denied review in 2012. Corn-Revere also represented CBS in a parallel broadcast indecency proceeding Fox Television Stations v. FCC, in which the Supreme Court invalidated indecency fines as a violation of due process.

In 2005, Corn-Revere was lead counsel in Huminski v. Corsones, in which the United States Court of Appeals for the Second Circuit held that individual members of the public have a First Amendment right to attend court proceedings.

In 2009, Corn-Revere served as co-counsel for respondent in United States v. Stevens in which the Supreme Court of the United States ruled 18 U.S.C. § 48, a federal statute criminalizing the commercial production, sale, or possession of depictions of cruelty to animals, was an unconstitutional abridgment of the First Amendment right to freedom of speech.

Also in 2009, Corn-Revere represented Michael James Berger in a suit against the City of Seattle which challenged the constitutionality of the city's restrictions of the public forum in the Seattle Center, a multipurpose cultural and entertainment venue. After an initial victory at the trial level, the city appealed to the Ninth Circuit Court of Appeals where a three-judge panel overturned the lower courts' ruling. When the appeal was heard en banc by the Ninth Circuit Court of Appeals they reversed their earlier ruling and upheld the trial court's finding.

In 2010, Corn-Revere served as local counsel for the successful legal defense of adult film producer John Stagliano.

In 2012, Corn-Revere was lead counsel in Barnes v. Zaccari, in which the United States Court of Appeals for the Eleventh Circuit reaffirmed that a student in a state university has a right to due process before he may be punished or expelled. Following this ruling a jury in 2013 held that the university president, was personally liable, and had to pay $50,000 in damages to Hayden Barnes, the student he had wrongfully expelled.

In 2015, Corn-Revere won a ruling from the Seventh Circuit Court of Appeals holding that a local sheriff's use of threats to coerce credit card companies into ceasing providing service to an online classified advertising website violated the First Amendment.

From 2014 through 2021, Corn-Revere handled a series of First Amendment cases involving freedom of speech as counsel for the Foundation for Individual Rights In Education “Stand Up for Speech” litigation project. In one notable case in that series, the Eighth Circuit Court of Appeals held that Iowa State University's discriminatory denial of school trademarks to the ISU chapter of the National Organization for the Reform of Marijuana Laws violated the First Amendment.

Since 2018, Corn-Revere has represented the Woodhull Freedom Foundation, Human Rights Watch, the Internet Archive, and certain individuals in a First Amendment challenge to the Fight Online Sex Trafficking Act, or FOSTA.

In 2021, Corn-Revere won a ruling on behalf of independent filmmaker Gordy Price, holding a federal law that required commercial filmmakers to obtain a permit and pay a fee before conducting any filmmaking on federally controlled land violated the First Amendment.

In 2021, Corn-Revere filed an amicus brief on behalf of John and Mary Beth Tinker in Mahanoy Area School District v. B.L., a case where the Supreme Court reaffirmed the landmark 1969 students’ rights decision, Tinker v. Des Moines Independent Community School District.

== Posthumous Pardon of Comedian Lenny Bruce ==
In 2003, Corn-Revere successfully petitioned New York Governor George Pataki to issue a posthumous pardon for comedian Lenny Bruce, who had been convicted for obscenity in 1964. It was the first posthumous pardon in New York history. The pardon effort was inspired by the book The Trials of Lenny Bruce, by Ronald Collins and David Skover. The petition effort was the subject of a front page New York Times story, and was profiled by SuperLawyers magazine in 2008.

== Report on the proposed Flag Desecration Amendment ==
Between 1995 and 2006, Congress considered a number of proposals to amend the First Amendment to allow the government to criminalize burning the United States flag as a form of political protest.

In 2005, Corn-Revere was commissioned by the Freedom Forum First Amendment Center to draft a legal analysis of the potential consequences of the proposal then pending in the 109th Congress. The resulting report, titled "Implementing a Flag-Desecration Amendment to the U.S. Constitution: An end to the controversy ... or a new beginning?," concluded that the proposed amendment would likely be challenged on collateral matters in ways that would require the courts, and ultimately the U.S. Supreme Court, to parse the exact meaning of ambiguous terms contained therein. The focus of the report was on the meanings that would be assigned to the phrases, "physical desecration" and "flag of the United States." The report concluded that the Supreme Court was likely to interpret this language narrowly, resulting in decisions that would not satisfy either proponents or opponents of the proposed amendment. The First Amendment Center distributed a copy of the report to every member of Congress.

In 2006, the proposed flag desecration amendment failed by one vote in the Senate.

== Background ==
Prior to Davis Wright Tremaine, Corn-Revere served as partner at Hogan & Hartson LLP, Chief Counsel to Chairman James H. Quello of the Federal Communications Commission, and as Associate at Hogan & Hartson, Associate at Steptoe & Johnson LLP.

From 1987 to 2001, Corn-Revere was an adjunct professor at the Columbus School of Law, Catholic University of America.

== Community involvement ==
Corn-Revere is a past President and National Chairman of the First Amendment Lawyers Association, Editorial Advisor, Free Expression in America Series, Rowman & Littlefield Publishers, Inc., a member of the Media Institute First Amendment Advisory Council since 1997 (chair, 1997–2003; Board of Trustees, 1997–2003). From 2000 to 2002, Corn-Revere served on the board of the American Library Association Freedom to Read Foundation.

In 2022, the Foundation for Individual Rights in Education added Mr. Corn-Revere to its Advisory Council. Corn-Revere joined the organization's staff as its Chief Counsel in 2023.

Corn-Revere received the Kenneth P. McLaughlin Award of Merit in 2014 from the National Press Photographers Association, and the Vickie Award in 2011 from the Victoria Woodhull Sexual Freedom Alliance. He was named a Distinguished Alumnus of Eastern Illinois University in 2009, and in 2012 was commencement speaker at EIU, at which time he was awarded an Honorary Doctor of Laws degree. He received the Davis Wright Tremaine Willard J. Wright Award for community service in 2011.

== Education ==
Corn-Revere graduated with a Juris Doctor from Catholic University of America, Columbus School of Law in 1983. Prior to law school, Corn-Revere obtained an M.A. from the University of Massachusetts Amherst in 1980 and a B.A. from Eastern Illinois University in 1977.
