= Franklin Van Valkenburgh =

US Navy Medal of Honor recipient (1888–1941)

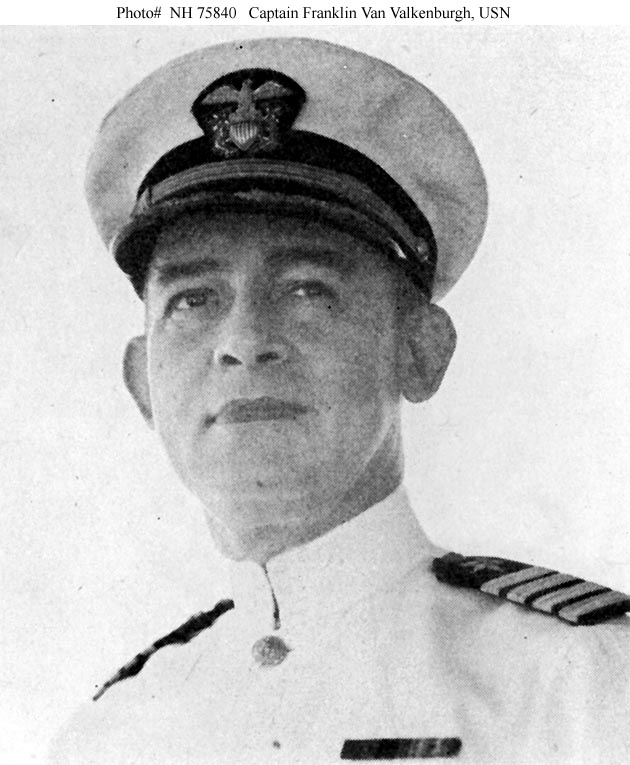
- Born: April 5, 1888; Minneapolis, Minnesota
- Died: December 7, 1941 (aged 53); Pearl Harbor, Territory of Hawaii
- Military career
- Allegiance: United States of America
- Branch: United States Navy
- Service years: 1909–1941
- Rank: Captain
- Commands: USS Talbot (DD-114); Destroyer Squadron Five; USS Melville (AD-2); USS Arizona (BB-39)
- Conflicts: World War II: Attack on Pearl Harbor †
- Awards: Medal of Honor

Franklin Van Valkenburgh (April 5, 1888 – December 7, 1941) was an American naval officer who served as the last captain of the USS Arizona (BB-39). He was killed when the Arizona exploded and sank during the attack on Pearl Harbor.

== Early life ==
Born in Minneapolis, Van Valkenburgh moved to Milwaukee when he was a toddler. His father was a prominent lawyer also named Franklin Van Valkenburgh, who served as Milwaukee assistant city attorney and a U.S. attorney for Wisconsin. His great-grandmother's brother was Daniel Wells Jr., who represented Wisconsin's 1st Congressional District in the 1850s. His mother was Jane Irvin Swoope, daughter of H.B. Swoope, a U.S. attorney for the Western District of Pennsylvania, the grandson of Captain Peter Swoope, Sr. an 18th Century pioneer of Huntingdon, Pennsylvania. Her brother was William Swoope, a member of the United States House of Representatives from 1923 to 1927. He grew up on Milwaukee's east side, attending Cass Elementary School and graduating from East Side High School, later renamed Riverside High School.

== Military service ==
Franklin Van Valkenburgh was appointed a midshipman at the United States Naval Academy on September 15, 1905, and graduated on June 4, 1909. After service in the battleship USS Vermont (BB-20) and in USS South Carolina, Van Valkenburgh was commissioned ensign on June 5, 1911. Traveling to the Asiatic Station soon thereafter, he joined the submarine tender USS Rainbow (AS-7) at Olongapo, Philippine Islands, on September 11,. He reported to the gunboat USS Pampanga (PG-39) as executive officer on June 23, 1914, for a short tour in the southern Philippines before his detachment on August 4,.

After returning to the United States, Lt. (jg.) Van Valkenburgh joined USS Connecticut (BB-18) on November 11,. Following postgraduate work in steam engineering at the Naval Academy in September 1915, he took further instruction in that field at Columbia University before reporting to USS Rhode Island (BB-17) on March 2, 1917. The entry of the United States into World War I found Van Valkenburgh serving as the battleship's engineering officer. Subsequent temporary duty in the receiving ship at New York preceded his first tour as an instructor at the Naval Academy. On June 1, 1920, Van Valkenburgh reported on board USS Minnesota (BB-22) for duty as engineer officer, and he held that post until the battleship was decommissioned in November 1921.

He again served as an instructor at the Naval Academy—until May 15, 1925—before he joined USS Maryland (BB-46) on June 26,. Commissioned commander on June 2, 1927, while in Maryland, he soon reported for duty in the Office of the Chief of Naval Operations on May 21, 1928, and served there during the administrations of Admirals Charles F. Hughes and William V. Pratt. Detached on June 28, 1931, Van Valkenburgh received command of the destroyer USS Talbot (DD-114) on July 10, and commanded Destroyer Squadron 5 from March 31, 1932.

After attending the Naval War College, Newport, R.I., and completing the senior course in May 1934, Comdr. Van Valkenburgh next served as inspector of naval materiel at the New York Navy Yard before going to sea again as commanding officer of USS Melville (AD-2) from June 8, 1936, to June 11, 1938. Promoted to captain while commanding Melville—on December 23, 1937—he served as inspector of material for the 3d Naval District from August 6, 1938, to January 22, 1941.

== USS Arizona ==
On February 5, 1941, Van Valkenburgh relieved Capt. Harold C. Train as commanding officer of USS Arizona (BB-39). Newly refitted at Puget Sound Naval Shipyard, Arizona served as flagship of Battleship Division 1 for the remainder of the year, based primarily at Pearl Harbor with two trips to the west coast.

In a letter to a relative, Faith Van Valkenburgh Vilas, dated November 4, 1941, Captain Van Valkenburgh wrote: "We are training, preparing, maneuvering, doing everything we can do to be ready. The work is intensive, continuous, and carefully planned. We never go to sea without being completely ready to move on to Singapore if need be, without further preparation. Most of our work we are not allowed to talk about off of the ship. I have spent 16 to 20 hours a day on the bridge for a week at a time, then a week of rest, then at it again.

"Our eyes are constantly trained Westward, and we keep the guns ready for instant use against aircraft or submarines whenever we are at sea. We have no intention of being caught napping."

On December 4, the battleship went to sea in company with USS Nevada (BB-36) and USS Oklahoma (BB-37) for night surface practice and, after conducting these gunnery exercises, returned to Pearl Harbor independently on the morning of the 5th to moor at berth F-7 alongside Ford Island.

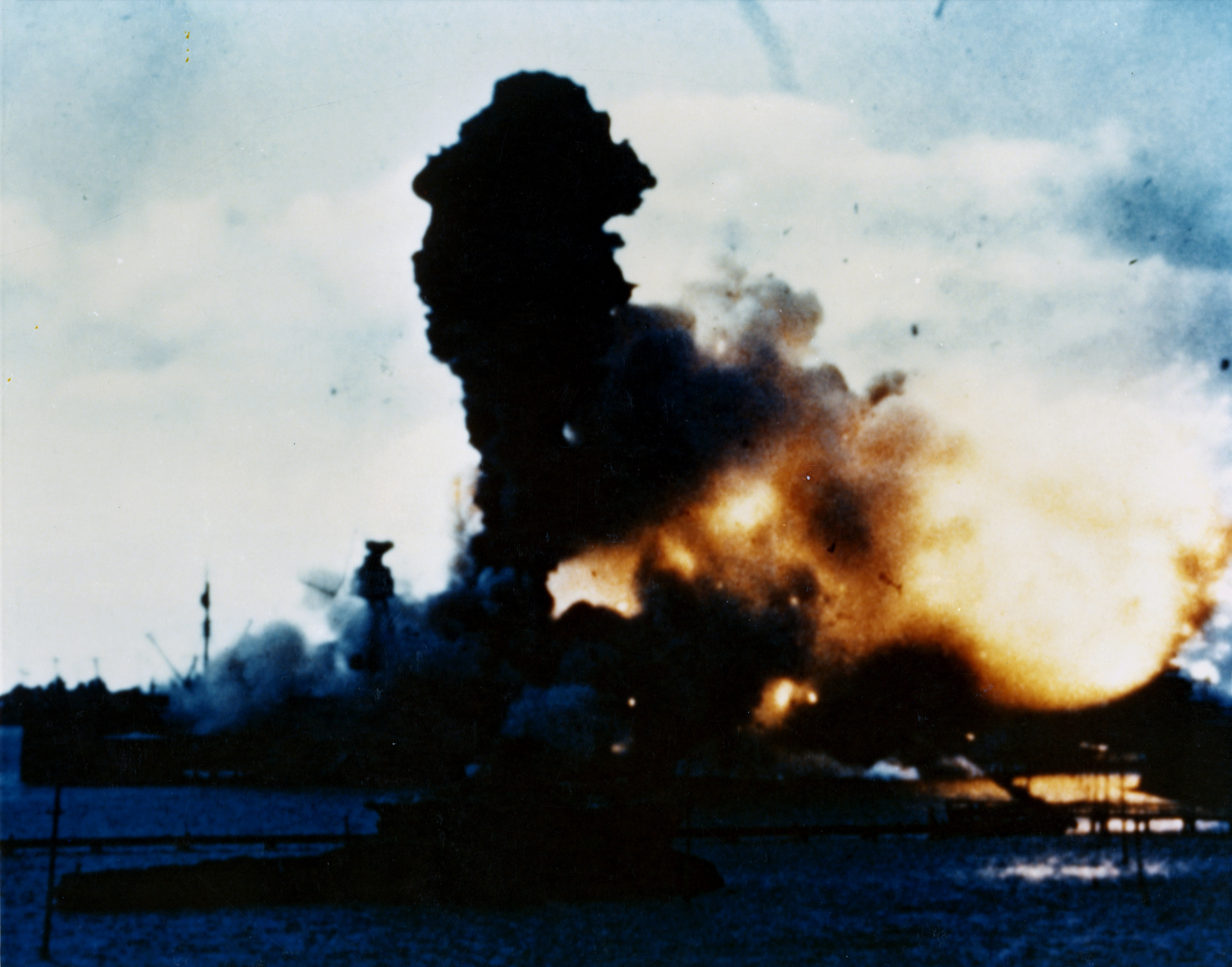
USS Arizona's forward magazines explode

Both Captain Van Valkenburgh and the embarked division commander, Rear Admiral Isaac C. Kidd, spent the next Saturday evening, December 6, on board. Suddenly, shortly before 08:00 on December 7, Japanese planes initiated their attack on Pearl Harbor. Captain Van Valkenburgh ran from his cabin and arrived on the navigation bridge, where he immediately began to direct his ship's defense. A quartermaster in the pilot house asked if the captain wanted to go to the conning tower—a less-exposed position in view of the Japanese strafing—but Captain Van Valkenburgh adamantly refused and continued to man a telephone.

A violent explosion suddenly shook the ship, throwing the three occupants of the bridge—Captain Van Valkenburgh, an ensign, and the quartermaster, to the deck, and blowing out all of the bridge windows completely. The ensign managed to escape, but Captain Van Valkenburgh and the quartermaster were never seen again. A continuing fire, fed by ammunition and oil, raged for two days until finally being extinguished on December 9. Despite a thorough search, Captain Van Valkenburgh's body was never found; all that was ever retrieved was his Annapolis class ring.

Captain Van Valkenburgh posthumously received the Medal of Honor—the citation reading in part: "for devotion to duty ... extraordinary courage, and the complete disregard of his own life."

== Namesake ==
In 1943, the destroyer USS Van Valkenburgh (DD-656) was named in his honor.

== Awards ==

Medal of Honor	Purple Heart	World War I Victory Medal
American Defense Service Medal with Fleet Clasp	Asiatic-Pacific Campaign Medal with service star	World War II Victory Medal

=== Medal of Honor citation ===
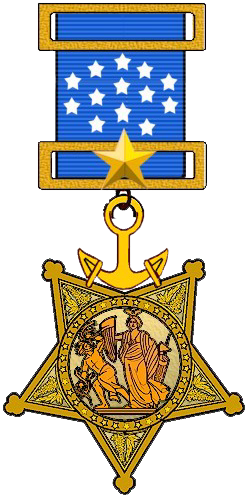

For conspicuous devotion to duty, extraordinary courage and complete disregard of his own life, during the attack on the Fleet in Pearl Harbor T.H., by Japanese forces on 7 December 1941. As commanding officer of the U.S.S. Arizona, Capt. Van Valkenburgh gallantly fought his ship until the U.S.S. Arizona blew up from magazine explosions and a direct bomb hit on the bridge which resulted in the loss of his life.

== See also ==
- List of Medal of Honor recipients
